= Ekiasha =

- Location in Kazakhstan
- Coordinates: 45°22′58″N 80°8′5″E
- Country: Kazakhstan
- Region: Jetisu Region
- District: Sarkand District
- Time zone: UTC+6 (Omsk Time)

Ekiasha is a village in Jetisu Region of south-eastern Kazakhstan.
