= Ekpindi =

- Location in Kazakhstan
- Coordinates: 45°44′11″N 80°37′06″E
- Country: Kazakhstan
- Region: Jetisu Region
- District: Sarkand District
- Time zone: UTC+6 (Omsk Time)

Ekpindi is a village in Jetisu Region of south-eastern Kazakhstan.
