= Enbekshi =

- Location in Kazakhstan
- Coordinates: 46°9′46″N 80°42′18″E
- Country: Kazakhstan
- Region: Jetisu Region
- District: Sarkand District
- Time zone: UTC+6 (Omsk Time)

Enbekshi is a village in the Jetisu Region of south-eastern Kazakhstan.
