= Kengzhyra =

- Village
- Location in Kazakhstan
- Coordinates: 45°30′01″N 79°45′0″E
- Country: Kazakhstan
- Region: Jetisu Region
- Time zone: UTC+6 (Omsk Time)

Kengzhyra is a village in Jetisu Region, in south-eastern Kazakhstan.
