= Aqbalyq =

- Location in Kazakhstan Aqbalyq (Asia)
- Coordinates: 46°33′58″N 79°12′34″E
- Country: Kazakhstan
- Region: Jetisu Region
- Time zone: UTC+6 (Omsk Time)

Aqbalyq is a village in Jetisu Region of south-eastern Kazakhstan. The population of Aqbalyq is around 90.
