= Koktuma =

- Village
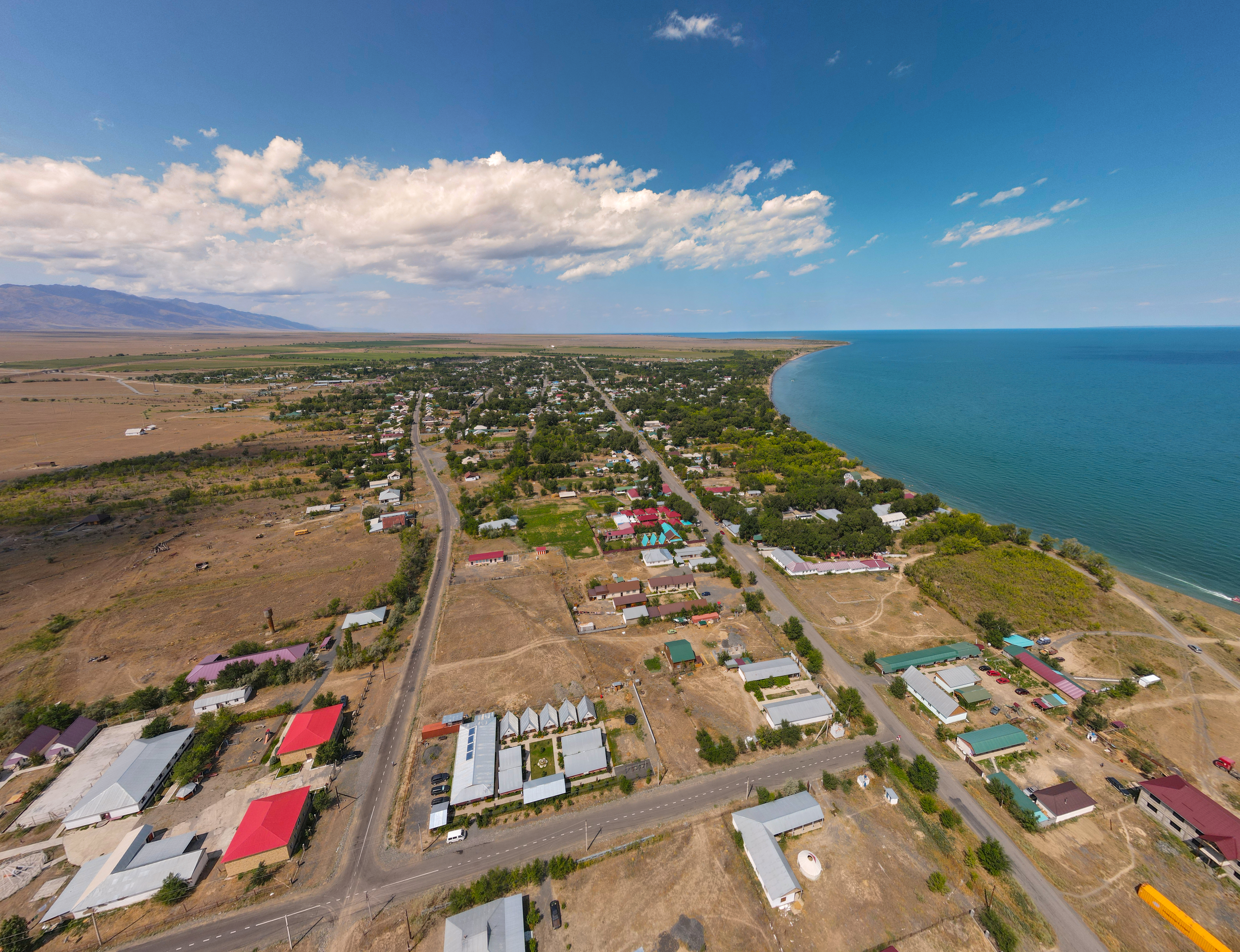

- Location in Kazakhstan
- Coordinates: 45°52′05″N 81°38′47″E
- Country: Kazakhstan
- Region: Jetisu Region
- Time zone: UTC+6 (Omsk Time)

Koktuma is a village in Jetisu Region, in south-eastern Kazakhstan.
