= Alghabas =

- Location in Kazakhstan Alghabas (Asia)
- Coordinates: 44°40′01″N 78°6′12″E
- Country: Kazakhstan
- Region: Jetisu Region
- Time zone: UTC+6 (Omsk Time)

Alghabas is a village in Jetisu Region of south-eastern Kazakhstan.
