= Gerasimovka, Kazakhstan =

Gerasimovka
- Village
- Location in Kazakhstan
- Coordinates: 45°47′21″N 80°52′04″E
- Country: Kazakhstan
- Region: Jetisu Region
- Time zone: UTC+6 (Omsk Time)

Gerasimovka is a village in Jetisu Region, in south-eastern Kazakhstan.
