= Panzhim =

- Village
- Location in Kazakhstan
- Coordinates: 44°12′24″N 80°12′36″E
- Country: Kazakhstan
- Region: Jetisu Region
- Time zone: UTC+6 (Omsk Time)

Panzhim is a village in Jetisu Region, in south-eastern Kazakhstan.
