= Elaman =

- Location in Kazakhstan
- Coordinates: 43°34′34″N 77°10′04″E
- Country: Kazakhstan
- Region: Almaty Region
- District: Sarkand District
- Time zone: UTC+6 (Omsk Time)

Elaman is a village in the Almaty Region of south-eastern Kazakhstan.
