= Artel' vostok =

- Location in Kazakhstan
- Coordinates: 45°12′N 79°3′E
- Country: Kazakhstan
- Region: Jetisu Region
- Time zone: UTC+6 (Omsk Time)

Artel' vostok is a village in Jetisu Region of south-eastern Kazakhstan.
