= Dyusen' =

- Location in Kazakhstan
- Coordinates: 43°35′N 76°55′E
- Country: Kazakhstan
- Region: Almaty Region
- District: Sarkand District
- Time zone: UTC+6 (Omsk Time)

Dyusen' is a village in Almaty Region of south-eastern Kazakhstan.
