= Zhongar-Alatau National Park =

National park in Kazakhstan

- IUCN category II (national park)
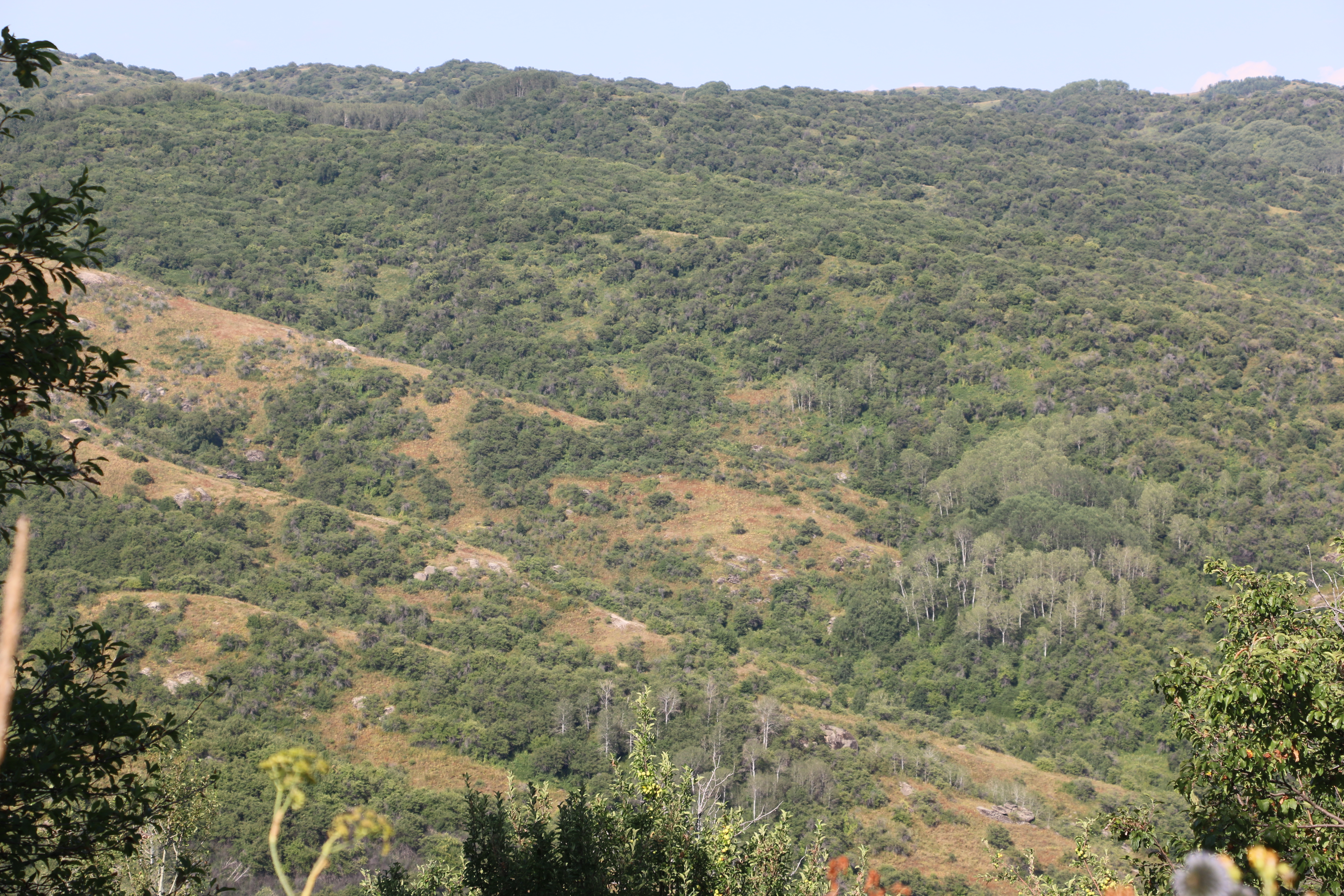
- Wild stands of Sievers apple trees in Zhongar-Alatau Park

- Location within Kazakhstan
- Location: Almaty Region
- Nearest city: Sarkand
- Coordinates: 45°0′N 80°0′E
- Area: 3,560.22 hectares (8,797 acres; 36 km^{2}; 14 sq mi)
- Established: April 30, 2010
- Governing body: Forestry and Wildlife Committee Ministry of Ecology, Geology and Natural Resources of the Republic of Kazakhstan
- Website: zhongaralataugnpp.kz

Zhongar-Alatau National Park (Kazakh: Жоңғар Алатауы ұлттық паркі, Joñğar Alatauy ūlttyq parkı), also Jungar Alatau, or Dzungurian Alatau, was created in 2010 to protect the unique ecology of the Dzungarian Alatau, an isolated, glaciated mountain range in Kazakhstan, on the southeastern border with China. One stated reason for creating the park is to protect forests of wild fruit trees, including apricots, barberry, cherries, and currants. Approximately 1% of the land area of the park is forested with Sievers Apple trees, which are the progenitors of all cultured apple varieties in the world. The park is 300 km long (west-to-east), and spreads across Aksu District, Sarkand District and Alakol District of Almaty Region, 300 km northeast of the regional city of Almaty.

== Topography ==
The park sits on the northern slope of the Dzungarian Alatau, a range between the Tian Shan to the south and the Altai Mountains to the north. The park's terrain is mountainous with steep, rocky canyons and streams running from south to north. The two main rivers - the Aksu River and the Lepsy River - flow north and west from the park into Lake Balkhash. The mountains feature extensive glaciers.

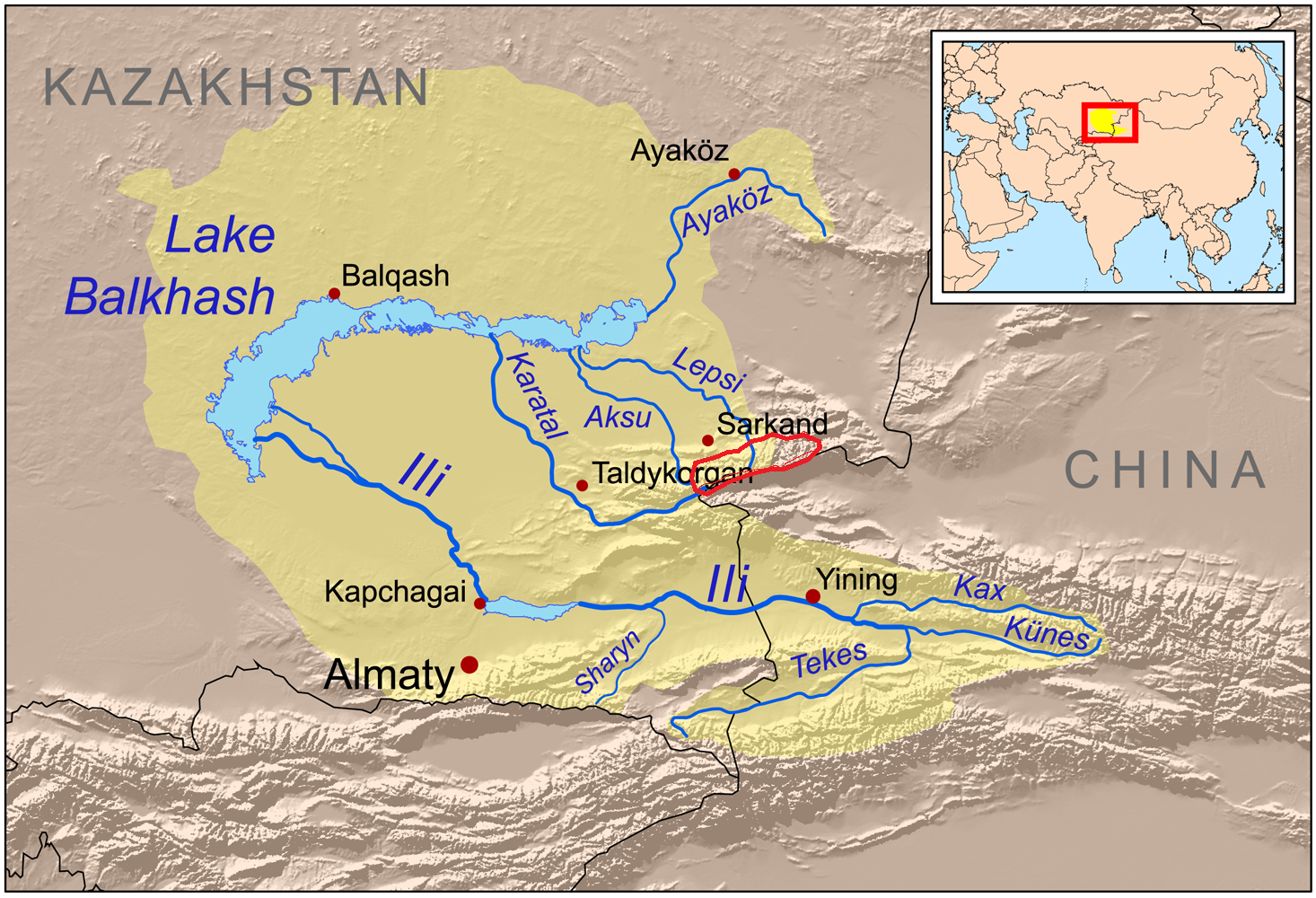
Zhongar Alatau National Park (border in red)

== Ecoregion ==
The park is in the Tian Shan montane steppe and meadows ecoregion (WWF #1019), which covers the Tian Shan mountain range of central Asia, with some adjoining ranges such as the Dzungarian Alatau to the north. The ecoregion is known for its isolation and high biological diversity due to altitude zones from steppe to alpine meadows to glaciers, and as a transition zone between boreal, steppe, and desert geographic regions. At mid-elevations, there is sufficient precipitation to support forests.

== Climate ==
The climate in the general region of the Zhongur Alatau is "Cold, Semi-Arid Climate" (Koeppen Classification BSk), although the middle and higher altitudes receive more precipitation and are colder than the surrounding region. "Koppen Bsk" climate is characteristic of steppe climates intermediary between desert humid climates, and typically have precipitation is above evapotranspiration. In the Zhongur Alatau, temperatures can range from an average of −1.9 °C (28.6 °F) in January to 25.9 °C (78.6 °F) in July. Average precipitation is 362 mm per year, with variations due to altitude and location.

== Plants and animals ==
The area is second only to the Altai region for biological diversity in Kazakhstan, as the area is at the meeting zone for several geographic and climatic regions, and also because of the high vertical range. Altitude zones cover desert, grassland, shrub, forest, meadow and alpine floral communities. The flora of the Zhetysu Alatau Mountains (the range covered by the park) includes 2,168 species of vascular plants, in 112 families and 622 genera. 76 of the species are endemic to the region.

While the forests are mostly pine and spruce, there are significant stands of wild fruit trees in the park. The best known is the Sievers apple (Malus sieversii), which is considered the source of all cultivated apple varieties in the world.

The park has recorded a number of snow leopards in recent years.

== Tourism ==
Environmental education and tourism facilities are being developed. There are presently seven tourist routes in the park:

- "Ethnographic tour" (Jungar Alatau historical sites)
- "Jasılköl"
- "Scientific and informative tour" (specific places to grow wild apple tree breeding Sievers)
- "Shumsky glacier"
- "Top Jasilkol"
- "Sarkansky forest"
- "Lepsy forest"
