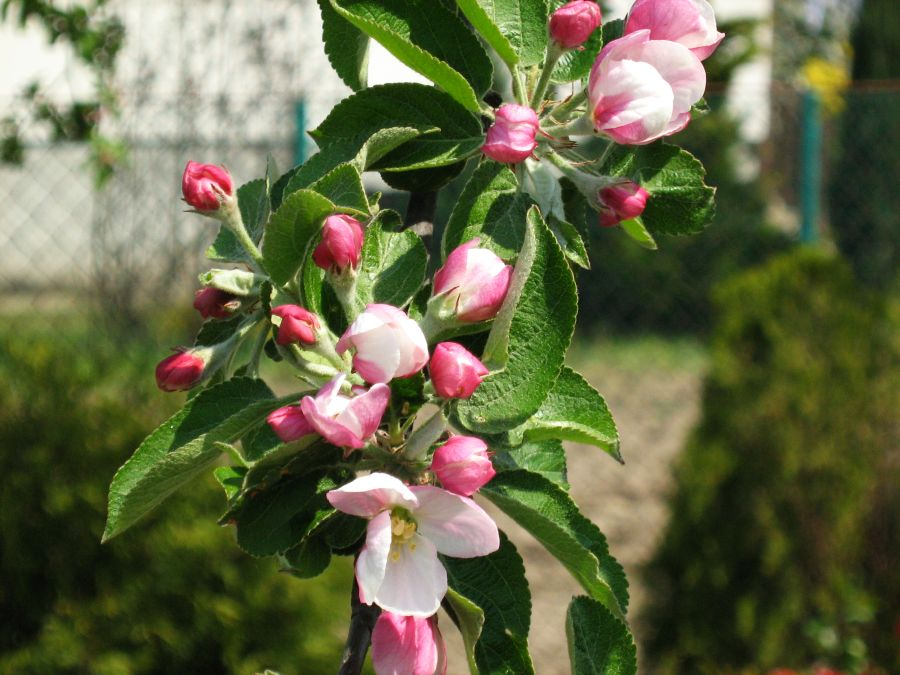

Conservation status
- Vulnerable (IUCN 3.1)

Scientific classification
- Kingdom: Plantae
- Clade: Embryophytes
- Clade: Tracheophytes
- Clade: Angiosperms
- Clade: Eudicots
- Clade: Rosids
- Order: Rosales
- Family: Rosaceae
- Genus: Malus
- Species: M. sieversii

Binomial name
- Malus sieversii (Ledeb.) M.Roem.

Synonyms
- Malus turkmenorum Juz. & Popov; Pyrus sieversii Ledeb. (basionym)

= Malus sieversii =

Species of plant

Malus sieversii is a wild apple. According to DNA analysis conducted in 2010 that sequenced the complete genome of the apple, it is the primary ancestor of M. domestica, the domesticated apple. Its scientific name is accredited to Johann August Carl Sievers.

Native to Central Asia, M. sieversii prefers warm and damp habitats. Its conservation status is vulnerable.

== Description ==
It is a deciduous tree growing 5 to 12 metres (16 to 39 ft), very similar in appearance to the domestic apple. Its pollen grains vary in size and are seen to be ovular when dry and spherical when swelled with water. Its fruit is the largest of any species of Malus except domestica, up to 7 cm in diameter, equal in size to many modern apple cultivars. Unlike domesticated varieties, its leaves go red in autumn: 62% of the trees in the wild do this compared to only 2.8% of the regular apple plant or the 2,170 English cultivated varieties.

M. sieversii has the capability to reproduce vegetatively as they form root suckers, or basal shoots. The clonal individual grows from the adventitious bud on the root, with identical genetic materials to the mother plant. It was originally believed that wild apples produce root suckers only when upper plant parts are damaged, but further evidence suggests root-sucker growth occurs in healthy plants as a dispersal aid.

For wild apples, proper development of root suckers requires certain humidity and aeration levels in the surface soil, where the mother root is located. Successful root-sucker growth also depends on shoot arrangement, time of growth and health conditions of the mother plant.

Genetics of self-incompatibility, the system for preventing self-fertilization in angiosperms, have also been studied for M. sieversii. Its genetic diversity in relation to self-incompatibility is substantially less when compared to its close relative, M. sylvestris. Although M. sieversii lacks this diversity, it can survive in the wild without intervention as long as no more diversity loss occurs. The leading theory for this lack of diversity is due to a major population bottleneck during the Last Glacial Maximum which caused wild M. sieversii populations to scale back into a smaller area within the valley of the Ili River.

=== Growth cycle ===
The growth cycle of M. sieversii could be divided into several stages from germination to developing fruit bearing trees, and to the death of aged trees.

- Period I starts from seed germination to the development of vegetative tree parts, and to the first round of fruiting. A typical apple tree reaches age 6 to 8 in this period. Prominent primary growth and a significant number of root sucker growth are seen in this period.
- Period II involves more growth and fruit bearing. Wild apple trees usually reach age 10 to 12 in this period. The number of fruits increase significantly as prominent secondary growth and branching take place.
- Period III involves more growth and fruit bearing. Wild apple trees enter regular fruiting and reach maximum fruit bearing in this period, and usually reach age 25 to 30. Decreased branching rate, and less growth of crown periphery are seen. A lot of vegetative growth is contributed by basal shoots (root suckers).
- Period IV is fully fruit bearing. Development of trees fully ceases in this stage and they reach around 60 to 70 years of age. Branching decreases as they slowly die off from the base to the periphery. After age 60 to 70, trees experience rapid desiccation of the branches, then death.

== Taxonomy ==
The species was first described as Pyrus sieversii due to its similarities with pears in 1833 by Carl Friedrich von Ledebour, a German naturalist who saw them growing in the Altai Mountains.

=== Progenitor of cultivated apples ===
Malus sieversii has previously been identified as the main contributor to the genome of the cultivated apple (Malus domestica), on the basis of morphological, molecular, and historical evidence. Fruit traits including crispness, more flavour intensity and fruit weight have undergone differential selection by humans to produce Malus domestica as seen today. The dispersal of M. sieversii and its progeny throughout history can be attributed to the Silk Road. A DNA analysis in 2010 confirmed M. sieversii as the progenitor of the cultivated apple. It has a highly variable genetic diversity therefore it is the genetic source for abiotic and biotic stress tolerance, many disease resistance and unique fruit traits.

Planting cultivated apple varieties close to wild groves causes crossbreeding.

== Distribution and habitat ==
Malus sieversii is distributed mainly within the Ili valley in southern Kazakhstan, where the damp climate suits its growth.

It appears in many different habitats. Although the species prefers high temperatures and short winters, it is also found in the Tian Shan mountains which have long and harsh winters.

== Conservation ==
After the collapse of the USSR and the closure of the Gardening Development Program, the local population began to actively cut down wild gardens in the Zailiyskiy Alatau. The vacated territories are used for building houses and grazing animals.

Malus sieversii has been designated as second conservation priority in the China Plant Red Data Book, and has been marked as vulnerable by the International Union for Conservation of Nature (IUCN).

Human activities and natural disasters are the major contributors to the decline of M. sieversii natural population. Fungal pathogens, such as Phytophthora plurivora and Alternaria alternata, also play a major role in the decline of M. sieversii populations, by degrading vegetative parts such as the fine root systems. This immune vulnerability makes M. sieversii become susceptible to more parasites, such as pathogenic insects Agrilus mali, to further destroy the population.

Ex situ conservation, or seed banking, is believed to be a feasible long-term resolution to protect its genetic diversity, and has been seen in the United States using seeds collected from Kazakhstan and the Kyrgyz Republic. In situ conservation was also found with barbed wire fences being placed around regions distributed with M. sieversii, as seen in areas within Xinyuan, China. A study in 2016 has shown the effectiveness of protecting M. sieversii populations in situ through stratification and seed coat removal. Also, in situ enclosures are more effective in higher elevations as they are at less risk of human and insect injuries.

Aside from traditional conservation methods, biofertilizer has shown effective results inhibiting fungal pathogen, Alternaria alternata in wild apple trees. It does this by improving antioxidant capability of wild apple trees following the infection, promoting root growth and enhancing soil metabolism. Recently, a combination of methods including cloning and plant hormone treatment has also shown effective results in regenerating wild apple populations.

Wild apple trees were heavily lumbered for economical and agricultural uses in the mountains of Kazakhstan during the 1800s. Wild apple forests were turned into pastureland, which greatly changed the soil covering, and damaged young seedlings and roots. Prickly shrubs, such as eglantine and barberry exhibiting symbiotic relationships with wild apples by shielding them from predators were also cut. This further worsened the growing condition for wild apples, and severely weakened root suckers and therefore vegetative propagation.

== Cultivation ==
These and other Malus species have been used in some recent breeding programmes to develop apples suitable for growing in harsh climates unsuitable for M. domestica, mainly for increased cold tolerance. A study in 2020 has discovered various gene inserts involved in dormancy and cold resistance features, such as heat shock proteins, in wild apples. In addition, desirable traits such as late flowering, early fruit maturity, short juvenility and stooling capability were studied by many breeding programs.

Malus sieversii has recently been cultivated by the US Agricultural Research Service, in hopes of finding genetic information of value in the breeding of the modern apple plant. Some, but not all, of the resulting trees show unusual disease resistance. The variation in their response to disease on an individual basis is, itself, a sign of how much more genetically diverse they are than their domesticated descendants. For instance, wild apples were found to have multiple blue mold resistant genes, specifically against Penicillium expansum. The USDA Plant Genetic Resources Unit (PGRU) also conducted phenotypic analysis on M. sieversii seedlings, and has identified various pathogenic resistance including apple scab, fire blight, and cedar apple rust. A research in 2001 found various insect resistances within M. sieversii seedlings, and has identified instances for further research on its resistance for apple maggots and apple leaf curling midges. Effects of heat on M. sieversii were also studied in hot and arid regions, and they were found to be considerably drought tolerant and sunburn resistant.

=== Red-fleshed apples ===
Malus sieversii has been recently used as a critical source in the breeding of red-fleshed apples, due to its high genetic variability. This is seen as they are used to improve the stress resistance towards drought, cold, and pests of cultivated apple species. Some neglected characteristics of M. sieversii, such as high-flavonoid contents (especially anthocyanin) and short juvenile phases, have recently been used for red-fleshed apple breeding since traditional red-fleshed apples are not rich in these flavonoids. Using M. sieversii for breeding due to its high anthocyanin content has numerous benefits, including preventing cardiovascular disease and protecting against liver damage. The variant of M. sieversii, Malus sieversii f. niedzwetzkyana, has been emphasized for the use of breeding red-fleshed apples since it has red flowers, fruit skin, and pulp; in addition to its high anthocyanin content. When breeding Malus sieversii f. niedzwetzkyana, it was found that light results in higher anthocyanin production than those bred in the dark. Hybrids of Malus sieversii have also been an interest for breeders of red-fleshed apples.

== In culture ==
Almaty, the largest city in Kazakhstan, and formerly its capital, possibly derives its name from the Kazakh word alma 'apple', and it is often explained as meaning 'full of apples' (the region surrounding Almaty is home to forests of Malus sieversii).

== Gallery ==
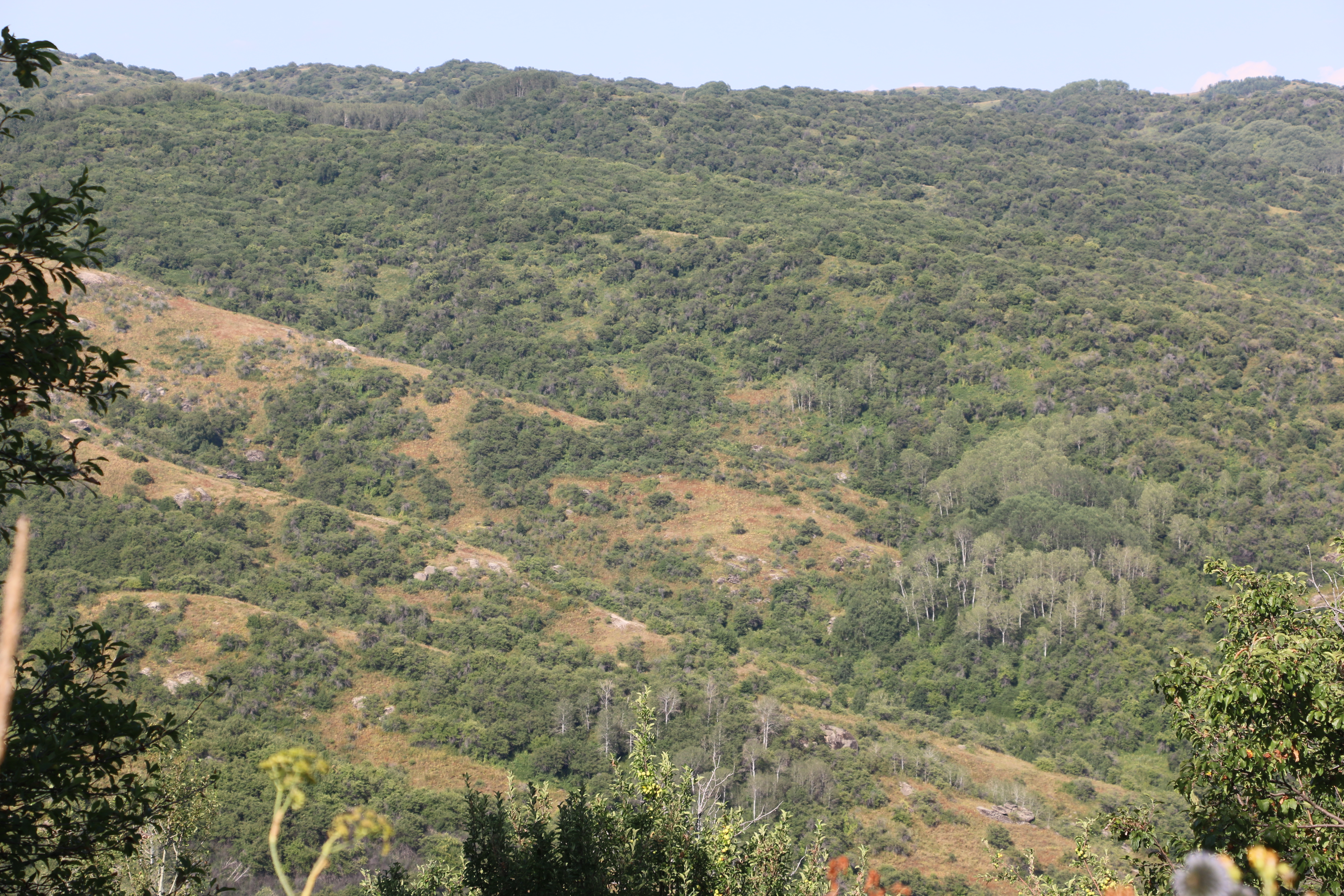
Malus sieversii trees in Zhongar-Alatau National Park

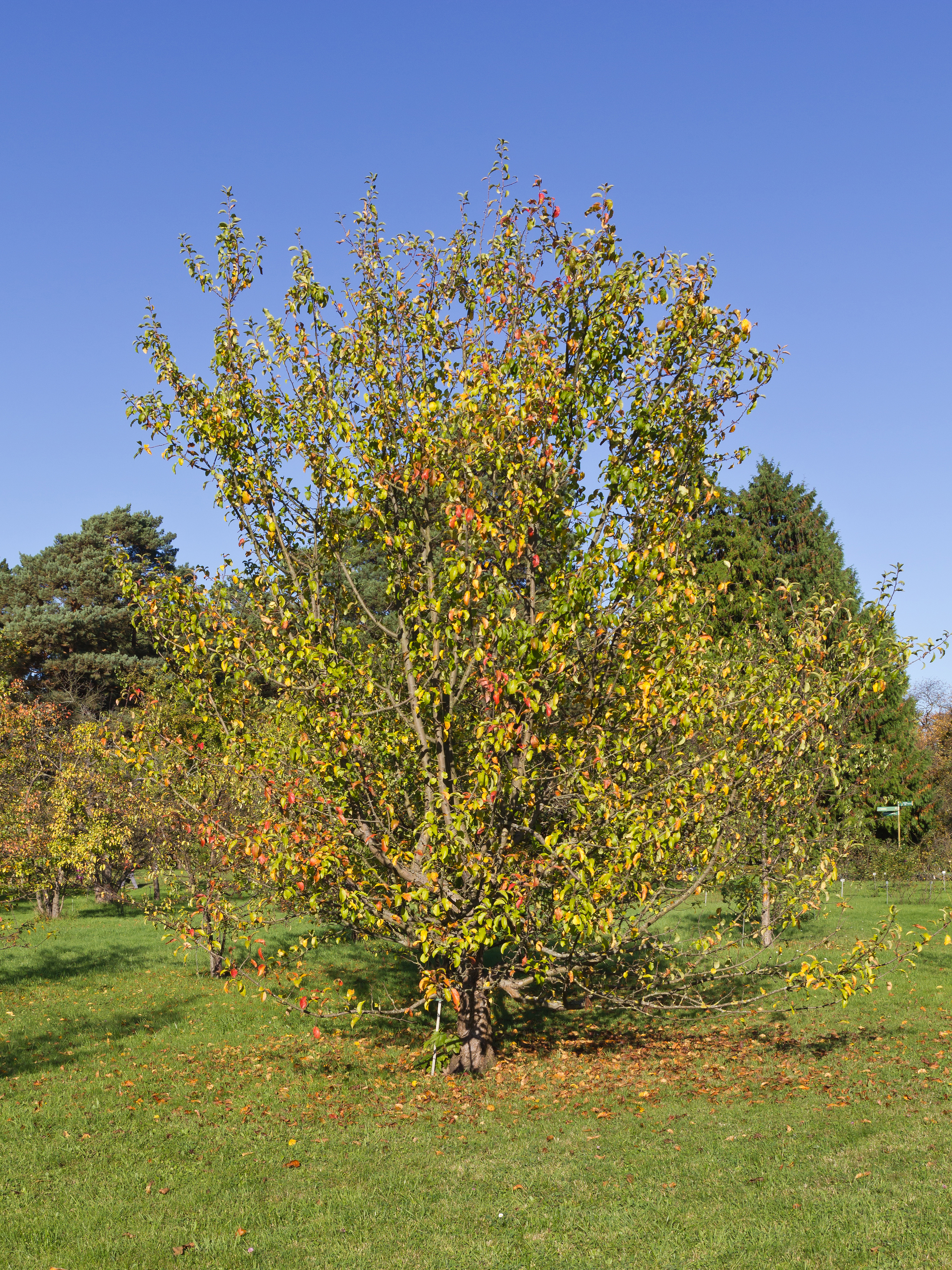
A tree in Berlin-Dahlem Botanical Garden in autumn

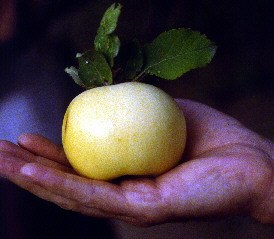
Fruit
