= Ekinshi Beszhyldyq =

Ekinshi beszhyldyq
- Location in Kazakhstan
- Coordinates: 43°11′0″N 76°54′0″E
- Country: Kazakhstan
- Region: Almaty Region
- District: Sarkand District
- Time zone: UTC+6 (Omsk Time)

Ekinshi beszhyldyq is a village in Almaty Region of south-eastern Kazakhstan.
