= Nechayev Sad =

- Village
- Location in Kazakhstan
- Coordinates: 45°08′10″N 79°0′0″E
- Country: Kazakhstan
- Region: Jetisu Region
- Time zone: UTC+6 (Omsk Time)

Nechayev Sad is a village in Jetisu Region, in south-eastern Kazakhstan.
