= Maylybay =

- Village
- Location in Kazakhstan
- Coordinates: 45°38′21″N 77°27′42″E
- Country: Kazakhstan
- Region: Jetisu Region
- Time zone: UTC+6 (Omsk Time)

Maylybay is a village in Jetisu Region, in south-eastern Kazakhstan.
