= Bel'bulak =

- Location in Kazakhstan
- Coordinates: 43°18′52″N 77°5′45″E
- Country: Kazakhstan
- Region: Almaty Region
- Time zone: UTC+6 (Omsk Time)

Bel'bulak is a village in Almaty Region of south-eastern Kazakhstan.
