= Imeni Panfilova =

- Village
- Location in Kazakhstan
- Coordinates: 43°23′23″N 77°7′40″E
- Country: Kazakhstan
- Region: Almaty Region
- Time zone: UTC+6 (Omsk Time)

Imeni Panfilova is a village in Almaty Region, in south-eastern Kazakhstan.
