= Qyzylqayrat =

Qyzylqayrat Kyzyl Gayrat
- Village
- Location in Kazakhstan
- Coordinates: 43°18′0″N 77°11′0″E
- Country: Kazakhstan
- Region: Almaty Region
- Time zone: UTC+6 (Omsk Time)

Qyzylqayrat or Kyzyl Gayrat is a village in the Almaty Region of south-eastern Kazakhstan.
