= Bezvodnyy =

- Location in Kazakhstan
- Coordinates: 43°32′N 76°52′E
- Country: Kazakhstan
- Region: Almaty Region
- Time zone: UTC+6 (Omsk Time)

Bezvodnyy is a village in the Almaty Region of south-eastern Kazakhstan.
