= NLT =

NLT may refer to:

- NLT (band), an American boy band (active 2006–2009)
- National Literacy Trust, a British charity (formed 1992)
- New Living Translation of the Bible (published 1996)
- New Looney Tunes, a television show (aired 2015–2020)
- Northolt Park railway station, Greater London, England (opened 1926)
- Xinyuan Nalati Airport, a seasonal airport in China (opened 2005; IATA:NLT)

== See also ==
- NLTS (oN-Line Text System)
