= Sarkand =

Sarkand Сарқан
- Town
- Location in Kazakhstan
- Coordinates: 45°24′36″N 79°55′7″E
- Country: Kazakhstan
- Region: Jetisu Region
- District: Sarkand District

Population (2009)
  - Total: 14,305
- Time zone: UTC+6 (Omsk Time)
- Postal code: 041500-041502
- Area code: 72839

Sarkand (Kazakh: Сарқан, Sarqan) is a town in Sarkand District in Jetisu Region of south-eastern Kazakhstan. It is the capital of the district.

== Climate ==
Sarkand has a humid continental climate (Köppen: Dfa) with cold winters and hot summers.

Climate data for Sarkand (1991–2020)
Month	Jan	Feb	Mar	Apr	May	Jun	Jul	Aug	Sep	Oct	Nov	Dec	Year
Mean daily maximum °C (°F)	−1.8 (28.8)	0.4 (32.7)	7.0 (44.6)	17.2 (63.0)	22.4 (72.3)	27.5 (81.5)	29.6 (85.3)	28.8 (83.8)	23.4 (74.1)	16.0 (60.8)	6.6 (43.9)	0.3 (32.5)	14.8 (58.6)
Daily mean °C (°F)	−7.7 (18.1)	−5.6 (21.9)	1.1 (34.0)	10.8 (51.4)	15.9 (60.6)	21.0 (69.8)	22.9 (73.2)	21.4 (70.5)	15.7 (60.3)	8.7 (47.7)	0.3 (32.5)	−5.6 (21.9)	8.2 (46.8)
Mean daily minimum °C (°F)	−12.7 (9.1)	−10.7 (12.7)	−4.1 (24.6)	4.4 (39.9)	9.2 (48.6)	14.2 (57.6)	16.0 (60.8)	14.0 (57.2)	8.1 (46.6)	2.4 (36.3)	−4.6 (23.7)	−10.3 (13.5)	2.2 (36.0)
Average precipitation mm (inches)	33.4 (1.31)	33.8 (1.33)	44.8 (1.76)	52.9 (2.08)	55.8 (2.20)	40.0 (1.57)	46.7 (1.84)	28.7 (1.13)	23.5 (0.93)	42.2 (1.66)	52.3 (2.06)	41.2 (1.62)	495.3 (19.50)
Average precipitation days (≥ 1.0 mm)	6.3	6.6	7.0	7.9	7.6	6.6	7.3	4.6	3.8	6.0	7.9	8.0	79.6
Source: NOAA
