= Kasymbek =

- Village
- Location in Kazakhstan
- Coordinates: 43°15′04″N 76°25′55″E
- Country: Kazakhstan
- Region: Almaty Region
- Time zone: UTC+6 (Omsk Time)

Kasymbek (Kazakh: Қасымбек, Qasymbek) is a village in Almaty Region, in south-eastern Kazakhstan.
