= Kamenka, Almaty =

Kamenka
- Village
- Location in Kazakhstan
- Coordinates: 43°11′05″N 76°49′51″E
- Country: Kazakhstan
- Region: Almaty Region
- Time zone: UTC+6 (Omsk Time)

Kamenka is a village in Almaty Region, in south-eastern Kazakhstan.
