= Kishi Qaraoy =

- Village
- Location in Kazakhstan
- Coordinates: 43°32′43″N 77°02′34″E
- Country: Kazakhstan
- Region: Almaty Region
- Time zone: UTC+6 (Omsk Time)

Kishi Qaraoy or Maloye Karaoy is a village in Almaty Region, in south-eastern Kazakhstan.
