= Aqdala =

- Location in Kazakhstan Aqdala (Asia)
- Coordinates: 45°1′59″N 74°31′44″E
- Country: Kazakhstan
- Region: Almaty Region
- Time zone: UTC+6 (Omsk Time)

Aqdala is a village in Almaty Region of south-eastern Kazakhstan.
