= Bazarkel'dy =

- Location in Kazakhstan
- Coordinates: 43°32′52″N 77°16′50″E
- Country: Kazakhstan
- Region: Almaty Region
- Time zone: UTC+6 (Omsk Time)

Administration building in Bazarkel'dy, Enbekshikazakh District, Almaty Region, Kazakhstan.

Bazarkel'dy is a village in Almaty Region of south-eastern Kazakhstan.
