= Intymak =

- Village
- Location in Kazakhstan
- Coordinates: 43°24′51″N 76°58′11″E
- Country: Kazakhstan
- Region: Almaty Region
- Time zone: UTC+6 (Omsk Time)

Intymak is a village in Almaty Region, in south-eastern Kazakhstan.
