= Arkabay =

- Village
- Location in Kazakhstan
- Coordinates: 43°25′03″N 77°5′31″E
- Country: Kazakhstan
- Region: Almaty Region
- Time zone: UTC+6 (Omsk Time)

Arkabay is a village in the Almaty Region of south-eastern Kazakhstan.
