= Gagarino =

Coordinates: 43.380939°N 77.003989°E

- Interactive map of Gagarino
- Country: Kazakhstan
- Region: Almaty Region
- Time zone: UTC+6 (Omsk Time)

Gagarino is a village in Almaty Region of south-eastern Kazakhstan.
