= Karakastek =

- Village
- Location in Kazakhstan
- Coordinates: 43°07′56″N 76°05′36″E
- Country: Kazakhstan
- Region: Almaty Region
- Time zone: UTC+6 (Omsk Time)

Karakastek is a village in Almaty Region, in south-eastern Kazakhstan.
