= Allium tekesicola =

荒漠韭 huang mo jiu

Scientific classification
- Kingdom: Plantae
- Clade: Tracheophytes
- Clade: Angiosperms
- Clade: Monocots
- Order: Asparagales
- Family: Amaryllidaceae
- Subfamily: Allioideae
- Genus: Allium
- Species: A. tekesicola

Binomial name
- Allium tekesicola Regel

Synonyms
- Allium deserticola Popov

Species of plant

Allium tekesicola is a plant species endemic to the Ili River Basin in Xinjiang and Kazakhstan.

Allium tekesicola produces one or occasionally 2 bulbs, each up to 10 mm across. Scape is up to 60 cm tall, round in cross-section. Leaves are shorter than the scape, very narrow. Umbels have only a few red flowers.
