= Masaq =

- Village
- Location in Kazakhstan
- Coordinates: 43°37′13″N 78°18′20″E
- Country: Kazakhstan
- Region: Almaty Region
- Time zone: UTC+6 (Omsk Time)

Masaq is a village in Almaty Region, in south-eastern Kazakhstan.
