= Bozinggen =

- Location in Kazakhstan
- Coordinates: 45°23′15″N 75°15′10″E
- Country: Kazakhstan
- Region: Almaty Region
- Time zone: UTC+6 (Omsk Time)

Bozinggen is a village in Almaty Region of south-eastern Kazakhstan.
