= Baganashyl =

- Location in Kazakhstan
- Coordinates: 43°11′55″N 76°54′55″E
- Country: Kazakhstan
- Region: Almaty Region
- Time zone: UTC+6 (Omsk Time)

Baganashyl is a village in Almaty Region of south-eastern Kazakhstan.
