= Baybulak =

- Location in Kazakhstan
- Coordinates: 43°16′39″N 77°11′25″E
- Country: Kazakhstan
- Region: Almaty Region
- Time zone: UTC+6 (Omsk Time)

Baybulak is a village in the Almaty Region of south-eastern Kazakhstan.
