= Klyuchi, Almaty =

Klyuchi
- Village
- Location in Kazakhstan
- Coordinates: 43°24′24″N 77°08′50″E
- Country: Kazakhstan
- Region: Almaty Region
- Time zone: UTC+6 (Omsk Time)

Klyuchi is a village in Almaty Region, in south-eastern Kazakhstan.
