= Qyzylashchy =

- Village
- Location in Kazakhstan
- Coordinates: 45°59′26″N 80°43′6″E
- Country: Kazakhstan
- Region: Almaty Region
- Time zone: UTC+6 (Omsk Time)

Qyzylashchy, sometimes spelled Kyzylashi, is a village in Almaty Region of south-eastern Kazakhstan.
