= Kokkaynar =

- Village
- Location in Kazakhstan
- Coordinates: 43°27′12″N 76°56′42″E
- Country: Kazakhstan
- Region: Almaty Region
- Time zone: UTC+6 (Omsk Time)

Kokkaynar is a village in Almaty Region, in south-eastern Kazakhstan.
