= Kazarma =

- Village
- Location in Kazakhstan
- Coordinates: 43°43′58″N 77°08′36″E
- Country: Kazakhstan
- Region: Almaty Region
- Time zone: UTC+6 (Omsk Time)

Kazarma is a village in the Almaty Region in south-eastern Kazakhstan. It is located about 990 kilometers (~615 miles) south of the country's capital, Astana.
