= Jetisu (disambiguation) =

Jetisu may refer to:

- Jetisu, a historical region of southeastern Kazakhstan
- Jetisu Region, a region of Kazakhstan
- FC Zhetysu, a Kazakh football club
