= Baqbaqty =

- Location in Kazakhstan
- Coordinates: 44°34′15″N 76°39′33″E
- Country: Kazakhstan
- Region: Almaty Region
- Time zone: UTC+6 (Omsk Time)

Baqbaqty (Kazakh: Бақбақты, Baqbaqty) is a village in Almaty Region of south-eastern Kazakhstan.
