= Karakemer =

- Village
- Location in Kazakhstan
- Coordinates: 43°25′34″N 77°37′23″E
- Country: Kazakhstan
- Region: Almaty Region
- Time zone: UTC+6 (Omsk Time)

Karakemer is a village in Almaty Region, in south-eastern Kazakhstan.
