= Apple genome =

Overview of the genome of Apples

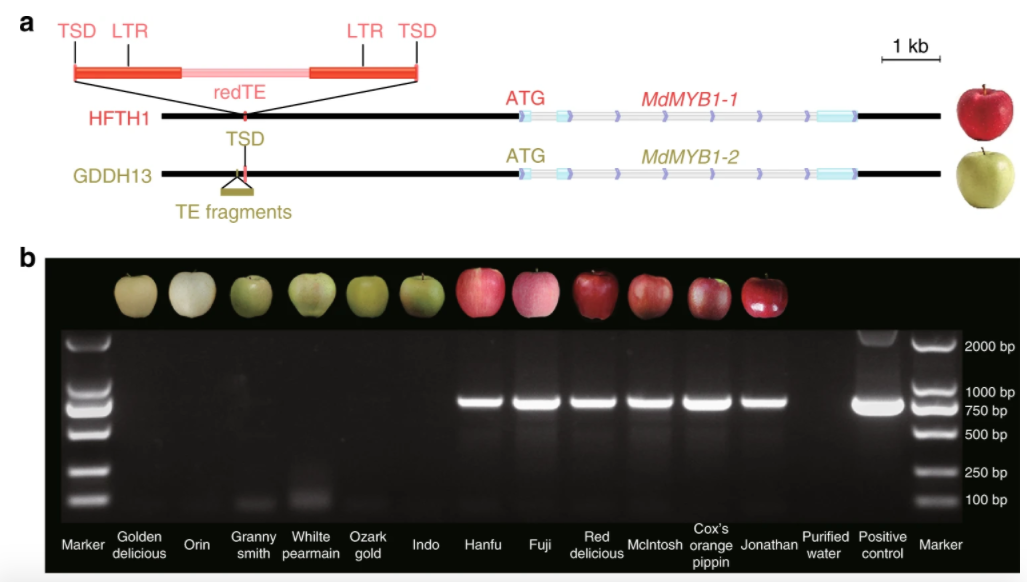
Red phenotype of apple associated with an LTR retrotransposon

In 2010, an Italian-led consortium announced they had sequenced the first complete genome of an apple in collaboration with horticultural genomicists at Washington State University, using 'Golden Delicious'. The apple genome has approximately 57,000 genes, which was the highest number of any plant genome studied at the time, and more genes than the human genome which has about 25,000 genes. The modern apple has 17 chromosomes which were found to be derived from an ancestor with 9 chromosomes that experienced genome-wide duplication. The genome sequence also provided proof that Malus sieversii was the wild ancestor of the domestic apple—an issue that had been long-debated in the scientific community.

In 2017 a new and higher quality whole genome sequence (WGS) for a double-haploid strain of the Golden Delicious variety of apple was published. This new sequence revealed a genome size of 651 Mb and 42,140 protein-coding genes. 60% of the apple’s genome is made up of transposable elements.

== Genetics of fruit color ==
Genetic evidence has confirmed that MdMYB1, which regulates transcription of the anthocyanin biosynthesis pathway, is responsible for the red color in apples.

Apple color is important when it comes to consumer preference, and red apples are generally preferred. An additional genome assembly of the Hanfu apple (HFTH1) was compared to the Golden Delicious (GDDH13) genome and showed extensive genomic variation largely due to transposable elements.

The transcript levels of MdMYB1 and anthocyanin-related structural genes in the skins of Hanfu and Golden Delicious apples are significantly different. MdMYB1 has at least three types of alleles (MdMYB1-1, MdMYB1-2, and MdMYB1-3). MdMYB1-1 is a single dominant allele controlling anthocyanin synthesis in apple skin. In non-red apples, the MdMYB1-2 and MdMYB1-3 alleles show a limited expression under intense light and low-temperature. The coding region differences of these alleles do not have an impact on functionality, and scientists do not yet know the reason for the differences in expression levels in the MdMYB1 alleles. In Golden Delicious and Hanfu apples, the coding sequences of MdMYB1 were the same, but one Single nucleotide polymorphism (SNP) was found in the intron regions. Upstream of MdMYB1, 15 SNPs and five indels were identified. These indels were very different between the two types of apples. One of these indels is an LTR retrotransposon called redTE, located in the Hanfu apple genome upstream of MbMYB1. RedTE has identical flanking LTRs which means it was a more recent insertion. Many red and non-red apples were tested, and redTE was identified in all of the red apples and none of the non-red apples, meaning that redTE may be responsible for the red color of apples.
