= Ili River =

River in Central Asia, through northwest China and southeast Kazakhstan

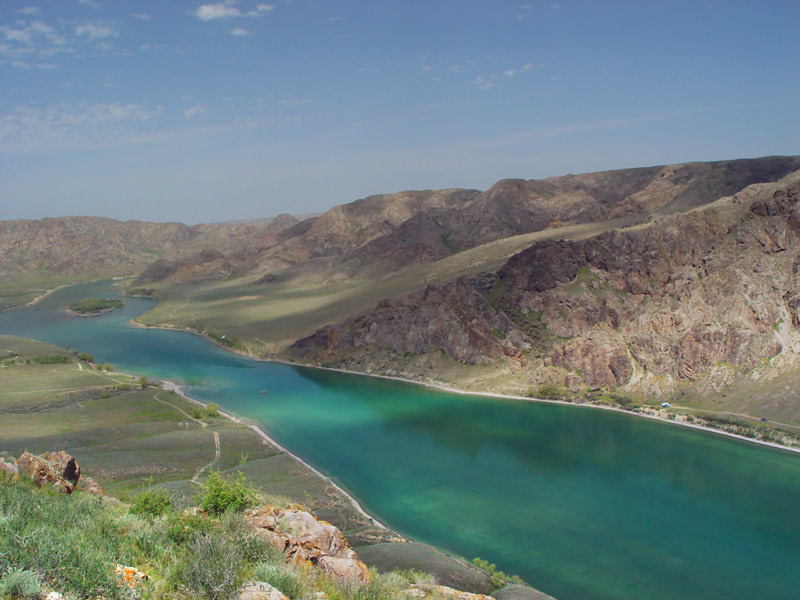
- Ili River

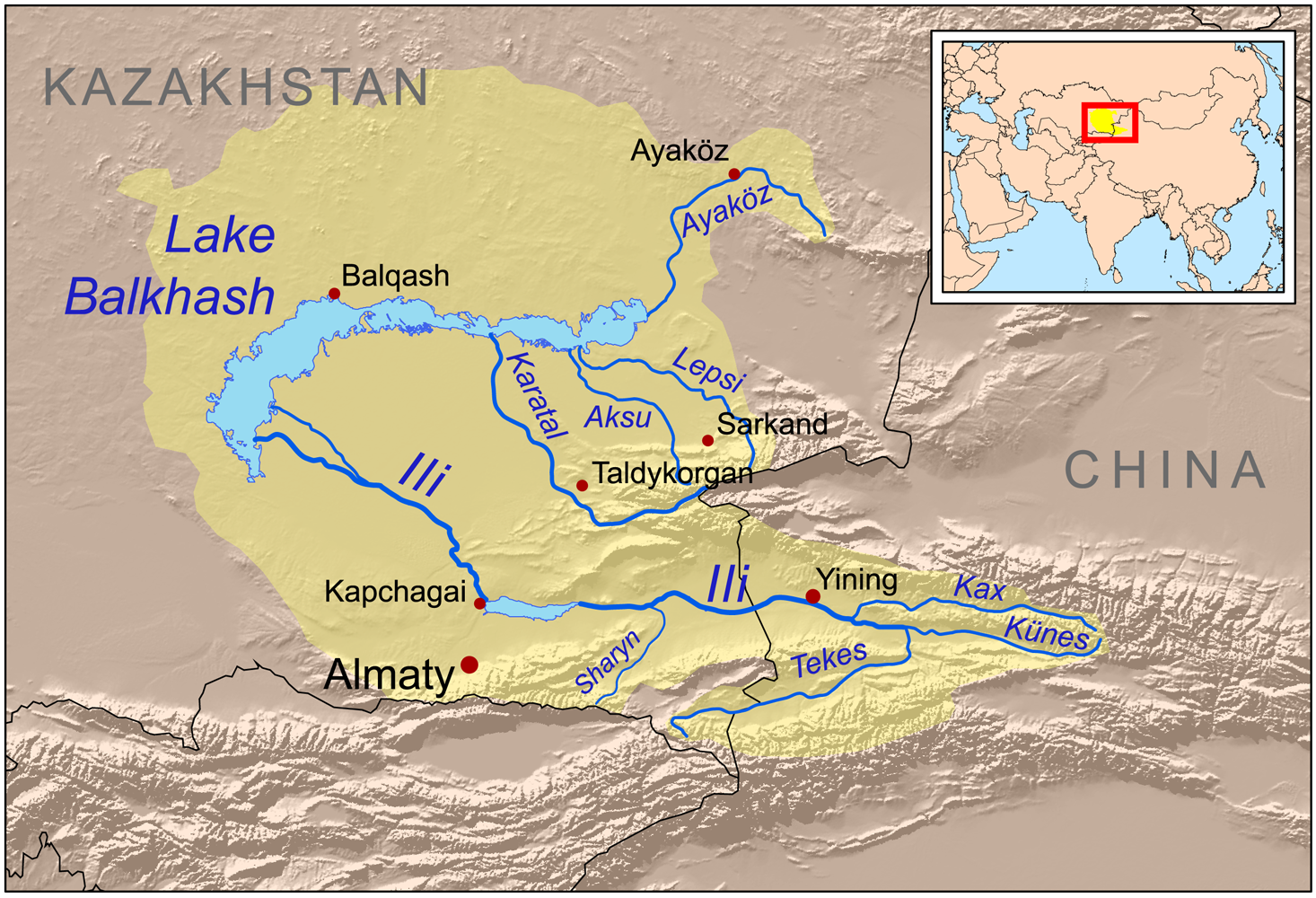
- Map of the Lake Balkhash drainage basin showing the Ili River and its tributaries, the Kash mistranscribed as 'Kax'

Location
- Country: Kazakhstan and China

Physical characteristics
- Source
  - location: Tekes and Künes rivers
  - elevation: Tian Shan
- Mouth
  - location: Lake Balkhash
- Length: 1,439 km (894 mi)
- Basin size: 140,000 km^{2} (54,000 mi^{2})
- Discharge
  - average: 480 m^{3}/s (17,000 cu ft/s)

Ramsar Wetland
- Official name: Ili River Delta and South Lake Balkhash
- Designated: 1 January 2012
- Reference no.: 2020

The Ili River (Note: Uyghur: ئىلى دەرياسى, romanized: Ili Deryasi, cyrillized: Или Дәряси; Kazakh: Ile өзені, romanized: Ile özenı, arabized: ئلى ؤزەنى; Kyrgyz: Или дарыясы, romanized: Ili daryiasy, arabized: ىلى دارىاسى; Russian: река Или, romanized: reka Ili; Chinese: 伊犁河; pinyin: Yīlí Hé; Cantonese Yale: Yīlàih Hòh; Dungan: Йили хә; Xiao'erjing: اِلِ حْ; Mongolian: Или мөрөн, romanized: Ili mörön) is a river in northwestern China and southeastern Kazakhstan. It flows from the Ili Kazakh Autonomous Prefecture of the Xinjiang Uighur Autonomous Region to the Almaty Region in Kazakhstan.

It is 1,439 kilometres (894 mi) long (including its source river the Tekes), 815 kilometres (506 mi) of which is in Kazakhstan. The river originates from the Tekes and Künes rivers in Eastern Tian Shan. The Ili drains the basin between the Tian Shan and the Borohoro Mountains. Flowing into Lake Balkhash (in the endorheic Balkhash-Alakol Basin), the Ili forms a large delta with vast wetland regions of lakes, marshes and vegetation.

== Name ==
The river's name is usually taken to derive from Mongolian il (ил, "open, clear, obvious") in reference to its wide central valley. The river's name also means some Chinese characters like 漓江. It is also variously derived from Persian or Iranian terms meaning "big river" or "murky" in reference to the water's condition at the confluence of the Kunges and Tekes. Some Uyghur scholars derive it from Uyghur il ("hook") after the supposed similarity in the river's shape. Tourist websites sometimes claim the name descends from the Mongolian word ilansu, meaning "shimmering" or "sparkling".

Mentions of Ili river can be traced back to the Mahmud al-Kashgari's dictionary of Turkic languages, the Dīwānu l-Luġat al-Turk (written in 1072–74). In the book, the author defines it in the following way: "Ili, the name of a river. Turkic tribes of Yaghma, Tokhsi and Chiglig live on its banks. Turkish countries regard the river as their Jayhoun (Amu Darya)."

== Chinese region ==
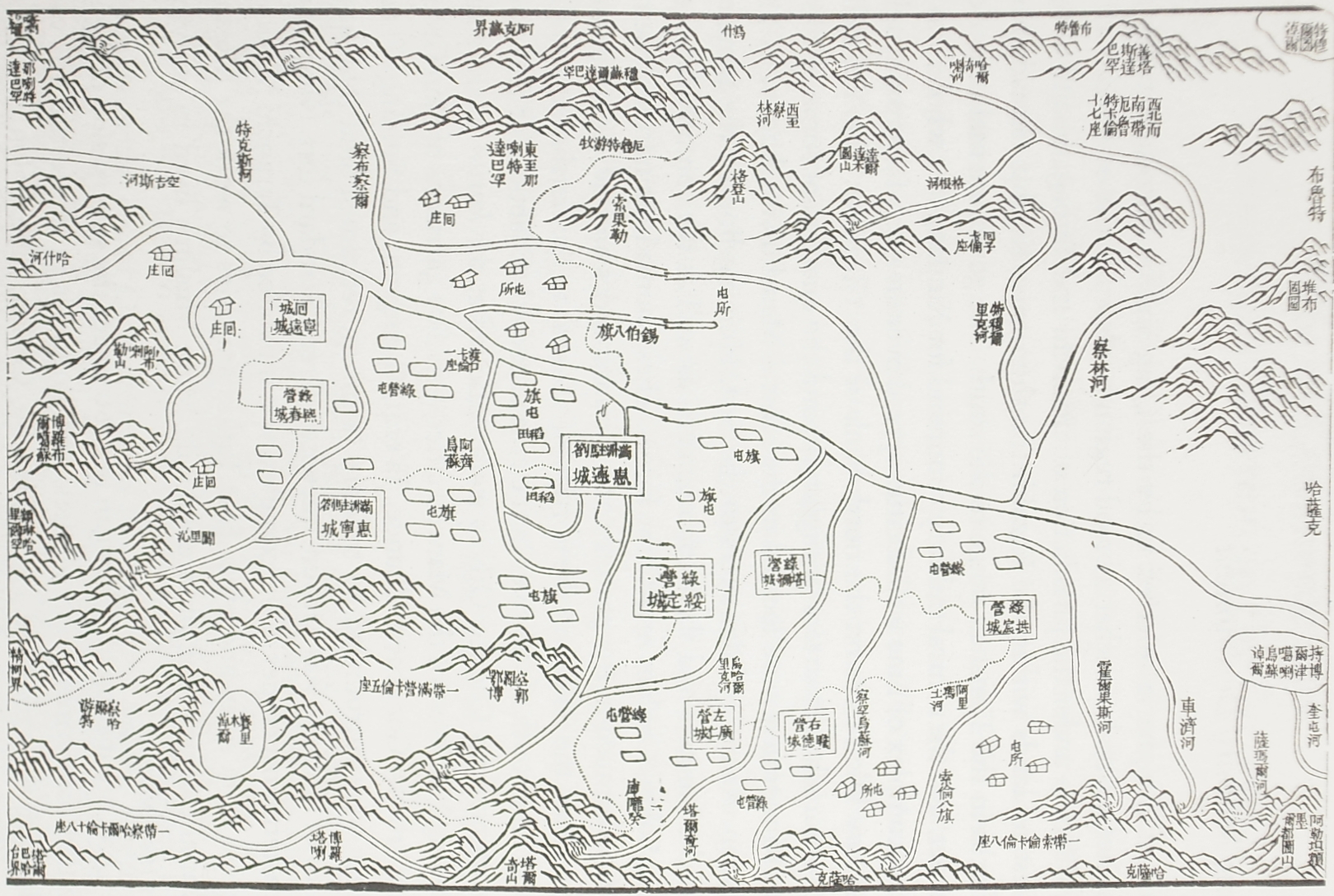
Qing bases in the Ili region, ca. 1809. Note that the map is upside down, i.e. the north is at the bottom, and the east is on the left.

The upper Ili Valley is separated from the Dzungarian Basin in the north by the Borohoro Mountains, and from the Tarim Basin in the south by the Tian Shan. This region was the stronghold of the Qing administration in Xinjiang in the late 18th and 19th centuries. It was occupied by Russia from 1871 to 1881 (from the Yaqub Beg rebellion until the Treaty of Saint Petersburg (1881)).

Presently, the region forms part of Xinjiang's Ili Kazakh Autonomous Prefecture. The main city of the region, Yining (Kulja), is located on the northern side of the river (about 100 kilometres (62 mi) upstream from the international border). Until the early 1900s, the city was commonly known under the same name as the river, 伊犁 (Pinyin: Yīlí; Wade-Giles: Ili). Qapqal Xibe Autonomous County in located on the southern side, which is home to many of China's Xibe people (who resettled there in the 18th century as part of the Manchu Garrison).

There are at least two dams on the Ili's tributary, the Kash River (喀什河), in Nilka County, at 43°51′40″N 82°50′52″E and 43°51′14″N 82°48′08″E. At least two dams have been constructed on the Ili's left tributary, the Tekes River, and the Qiapuqihai Hydropower Station (恰甫其海水电站) in Tokkuztara County (43°18′14″N 82°29′05″E). There is also another smaller dam at 43°23′41″N 82°29′20″E, on the border of Tokkuztara and Künes Counties.

== Kazakh region ==
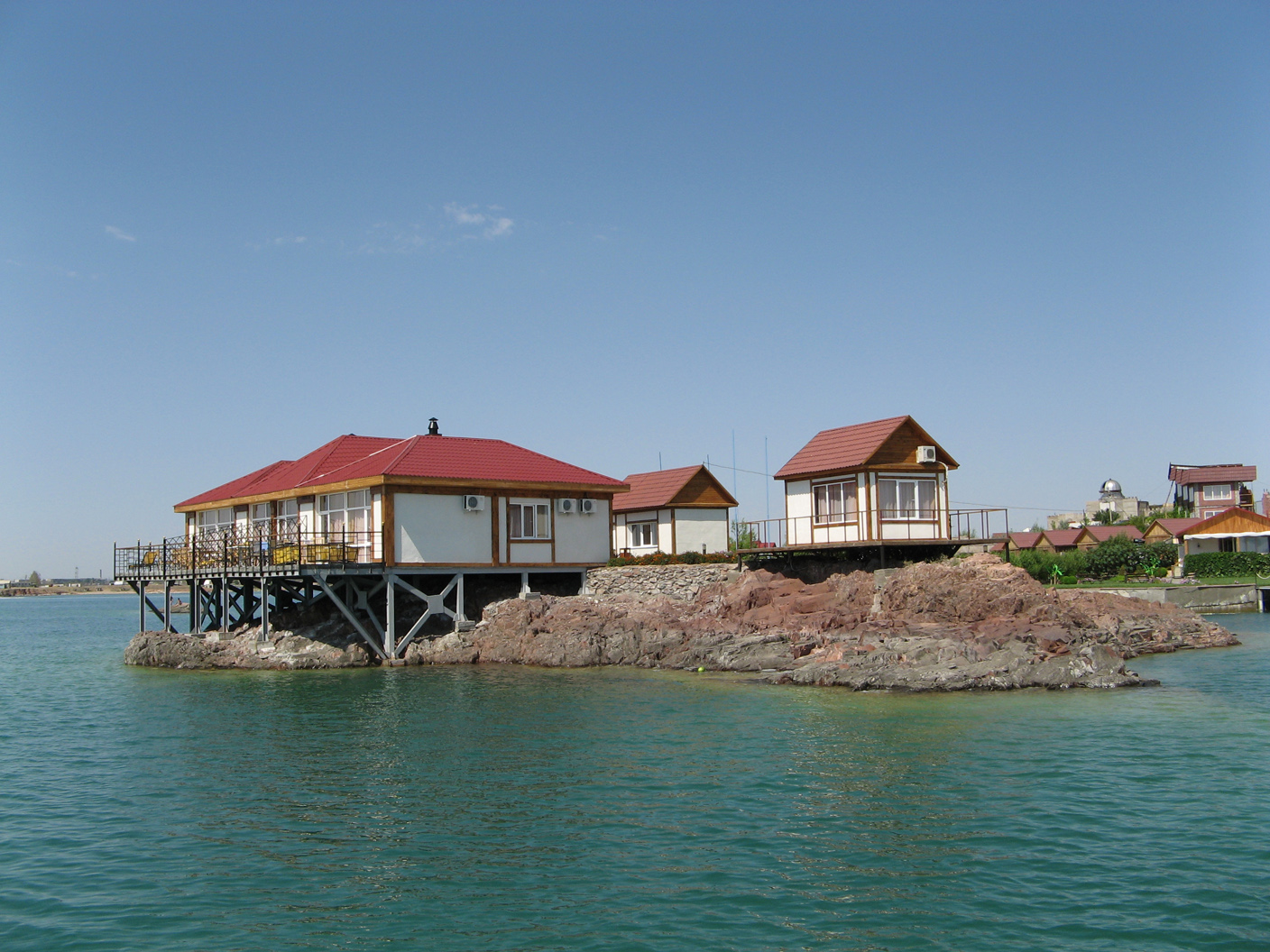
On the Kapchagay Reservoir

The Ili is the main watercourse of the Balkhash-Alakol Basin. The region of Kazakhstan partially drained by the Ili and its tributaries is known in Kazakh as Zhetysu ('Seven Rivers'). In Russian it is known as Semirechye (meaning the same).

The Kapshagay Hydroelectric Power Plant was constructed between 1965 and 1970 near Kapchagay in the middle reaches of the Ili River. This currently comprises the Kapchagay Reservoir, an artificial 110 kilometres (70 mi) long lake north of Almaty.

The Tamgaly-Tas, a protected site that comprises rock drawings, is located 20 kilometres (12 mi) downstream along the Ili River. The name Tamgaly in Kazakh means "painted" or "marked place", and Tas means "stone".

== Ili Delta ==
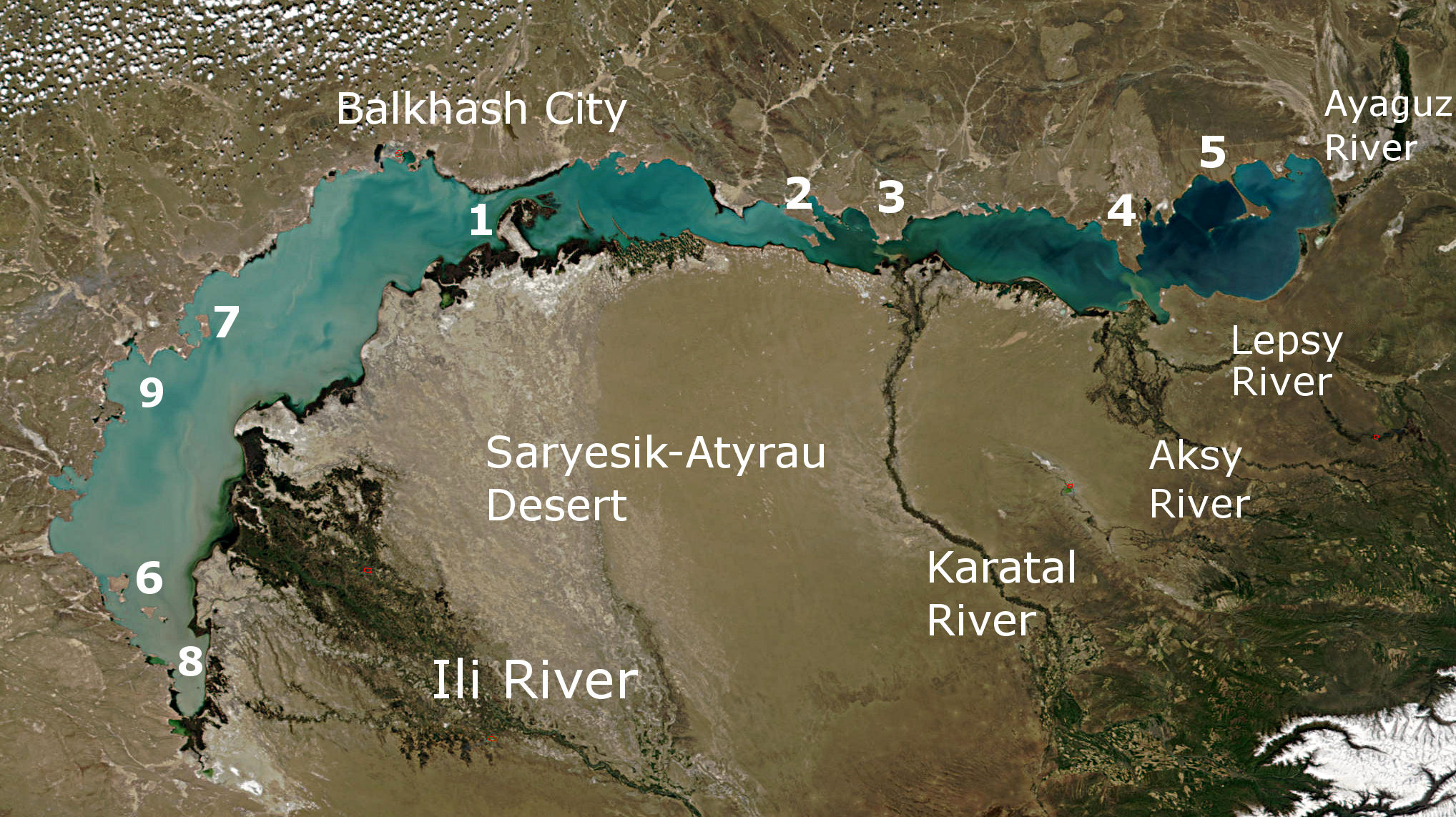
Balkhash lake with Ili delta

The Ili River flows into the southeastern edge of Lake Balkhash, where it forms a large delta of about 8,000 square kilometres (3,100 mi^{2}). The delta is situated between the Saryesik-Atyrau Desert and the Taukum Desert. An area of 9,766 km^{2} (3,771 sq mi) within the delta has been designated as a Ramsar Site. This site has 427 species of plants and 345 species of animals, including important populations of rare species (Dalmatian pelican, goitered gazelle, marbled polecat, white-headed duck, red-breasted goose, ship sturgeon, and others). The delta has also become popular amongst anglers for its wels catfish, which can grow up to over 300 lb (140 kg). The Ili river ranks third in Kazakhstan after the Irtysh river and the Ural river in terms of water content.

The Government of Kazakhstan plans to join the three sanctuaries Balkash, Karoy and Kukan (situated in the delta) into one National Park. Until 1948, the delta was a refuge of the extinct Caspian tiger. An introduction of the Siberian tiger to the delta has been proposed on account that it is a genetically close relative of the Caspian tiger. A large population of wild boar, the main prey base of the Caspian tiger, can be still found in the delta. There is also a small population of roe deer. In the drier steppes to the south of the delta live saiga antelopes and goitered gazelles.

Reintroduction of the Bactrian deer, another prey of the Caspian tiger, is currently under consideration. Another potential prey species considered to be reintroduced is the Asiatic wild ass.

== Historical connections ==
The Ili River treaty of 638 AD formalized the division of the Western Turkic Kaganate (552–638 AD) into the Nushibi and the Dulu. It also established the Ili River as the border between the two states. In the 21st century, increasing need for water in both China and Kazakhstan makes the management of the cross-border Ili River a topic of concern for environmentalists and politicians in Kazakhstan (who feel that their country may not get enough water flowing in from China any more).

The amount of precipitation in summer reaches 150–250 cubic metres (5,300–8,800 cu ft).

== Fishing ==
On the river, the fishing of Wels catfish, an introduced species, is popular. The largest specimen of this species recorded was 2.73m and 130kg.

== Gallery ==
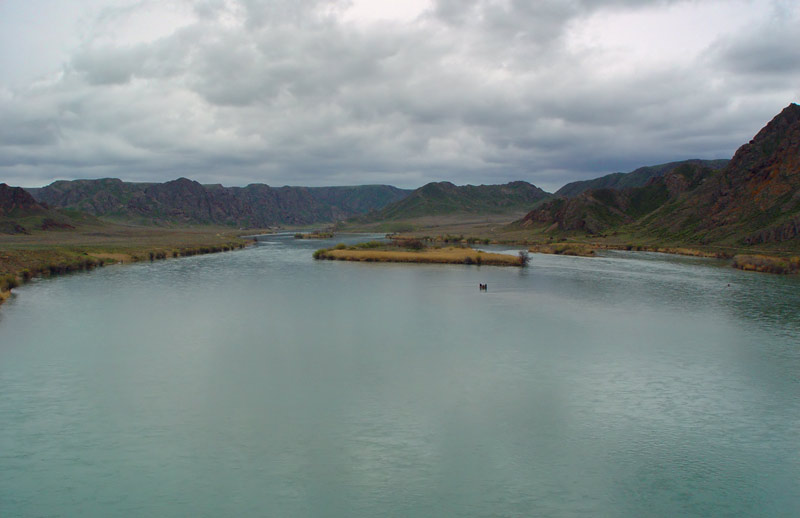
Ili River

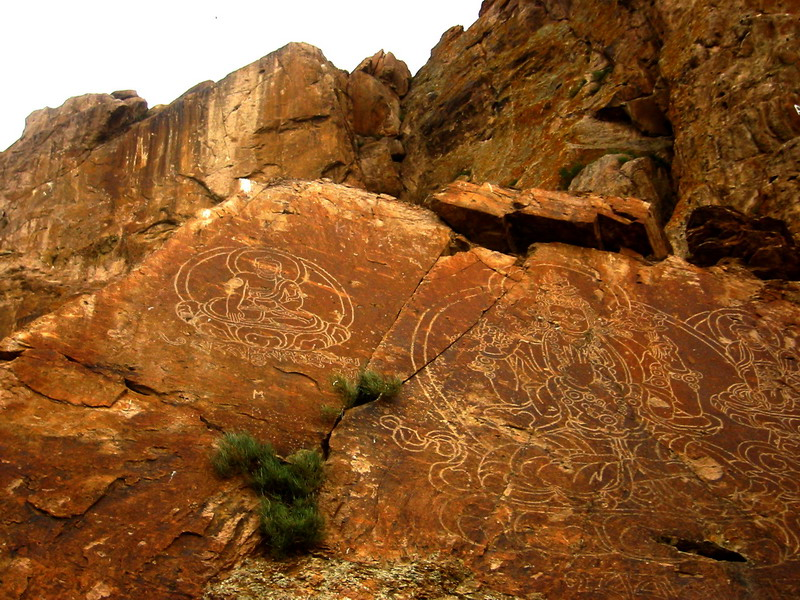
Buddhist rock drawings at Ili River

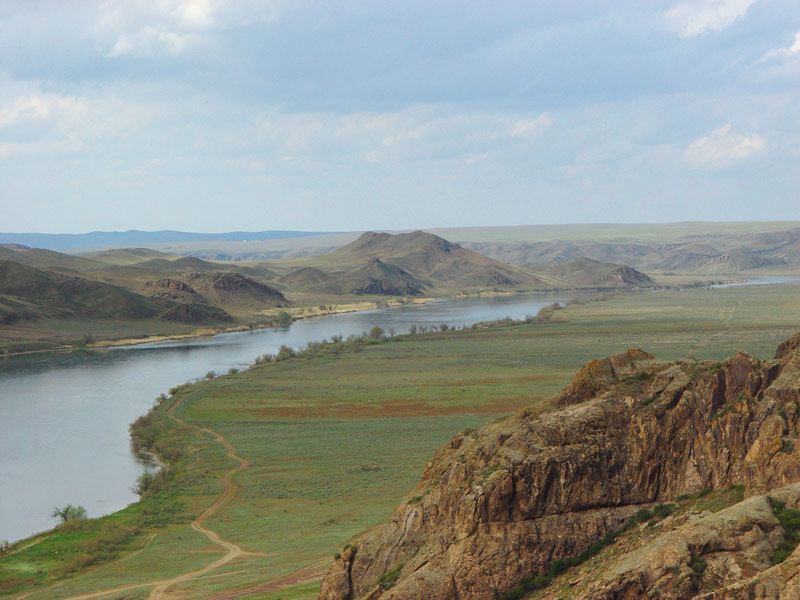
Ili River

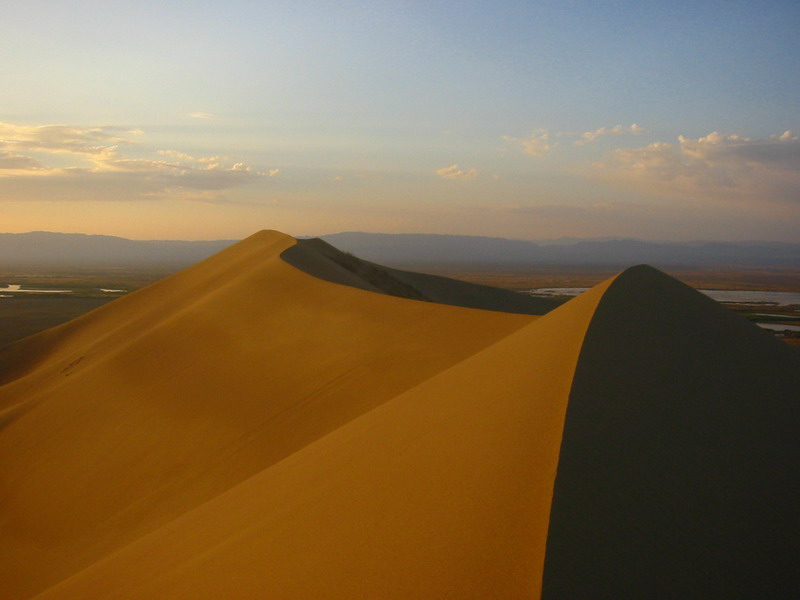
The "singing dune" at Altyn-Emel National Park

== Tributaries ==
The main tributaries of the Ili are, from source to mouth:

- Tekes
- Künes
- Kash
- Khorgos
- Charyn, famous for its canyon
- Chilik
- Talgar
- Kaskelen
- Kurty
