= Künes River =

Künes Kunges
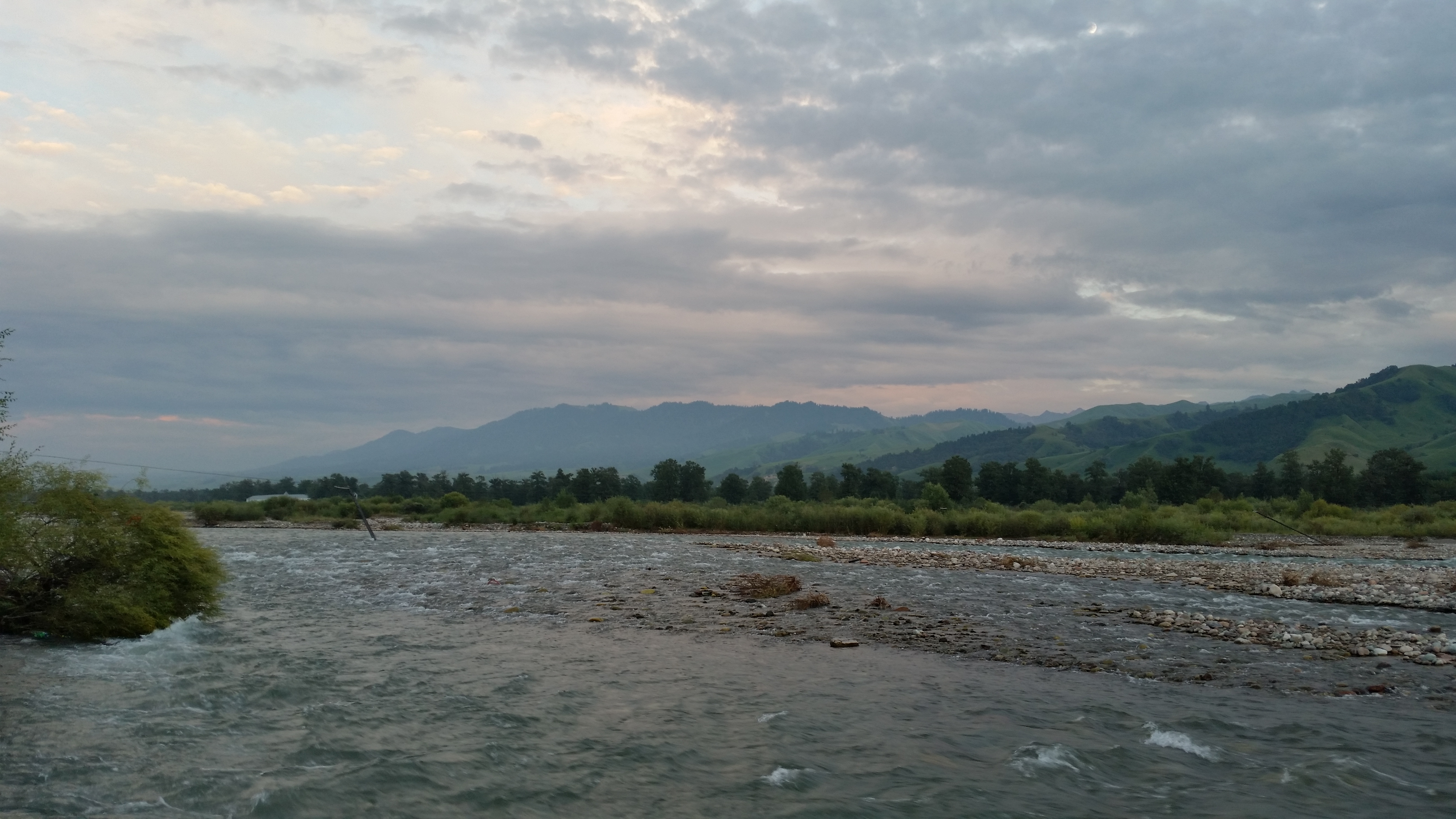

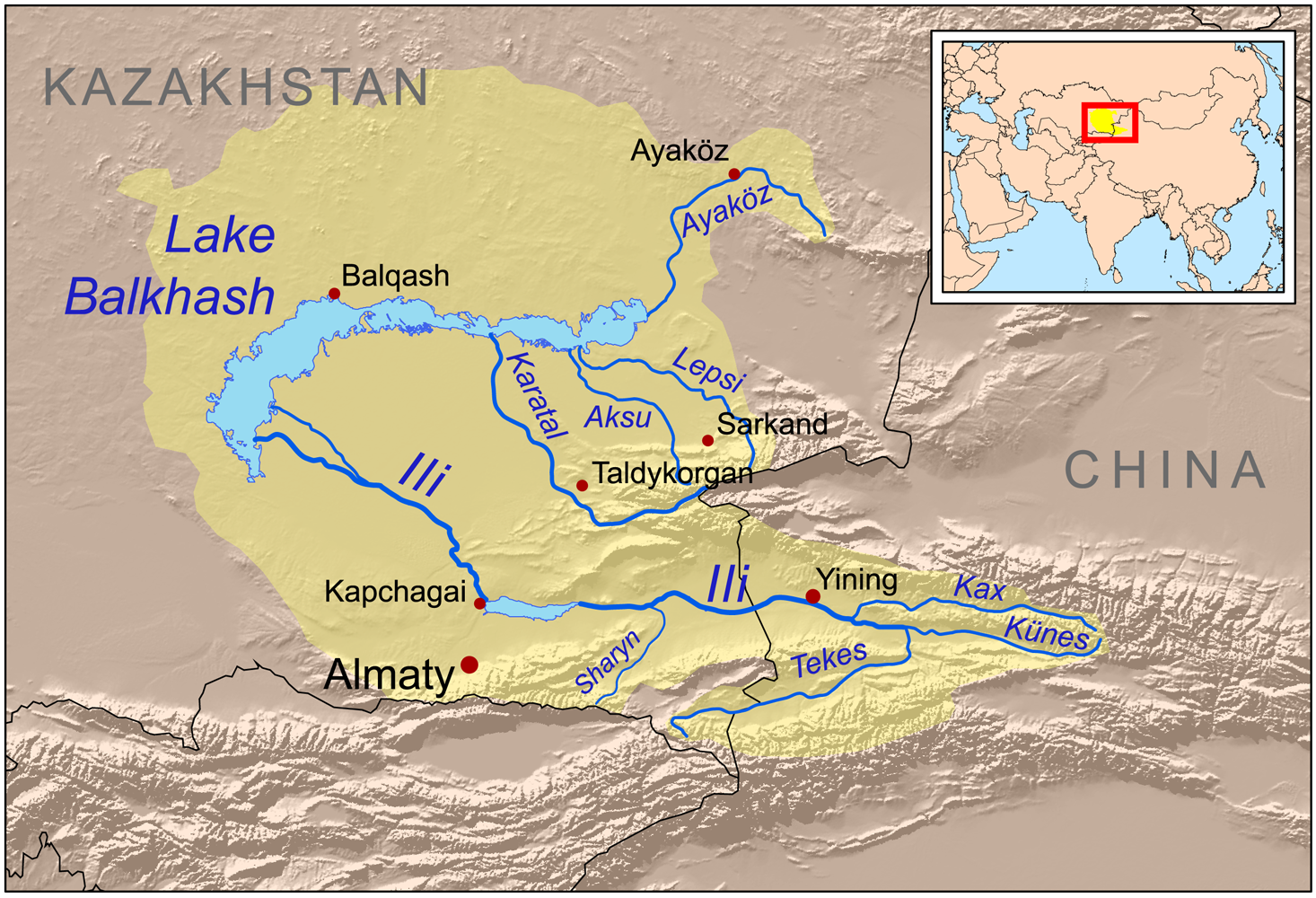
- Location of the Künes River in the Lake Balkash drainage basin
- Native name: دەرياسى كۈنەس (Uyghur); 巩乃斯河 (Chinese)

Location
- Country: People's Republic of China
- Province: Xinjiang Uyghur Autonomous Region
- County: Kunes, Nilka County, and Hejing County

Physical characteristics
- Source
  - location: Eren Habirga Mountains
  - coordinates: 43°12′35″N 84°50′51″E
  - elevation: 3300 m
- Mouth: Ili
  - location: Confluence with the river Tekes
  - coordinates: 43°34′45″N 82°32′51″E
  - elevation: 786 m
- Length: 258 km (160 mi)
- Basin size: 3532 km^{2}

Basin features
- Progression: Ili→ Lake Balkhash
- Tributaries
  - left: Tsanma (Tsauman gol)
  - right: Arshan, Merke (Borgustaya), Ken-su (Naryn gol, Kharkhan), Bokchurgan gol, Turgen

Künes River
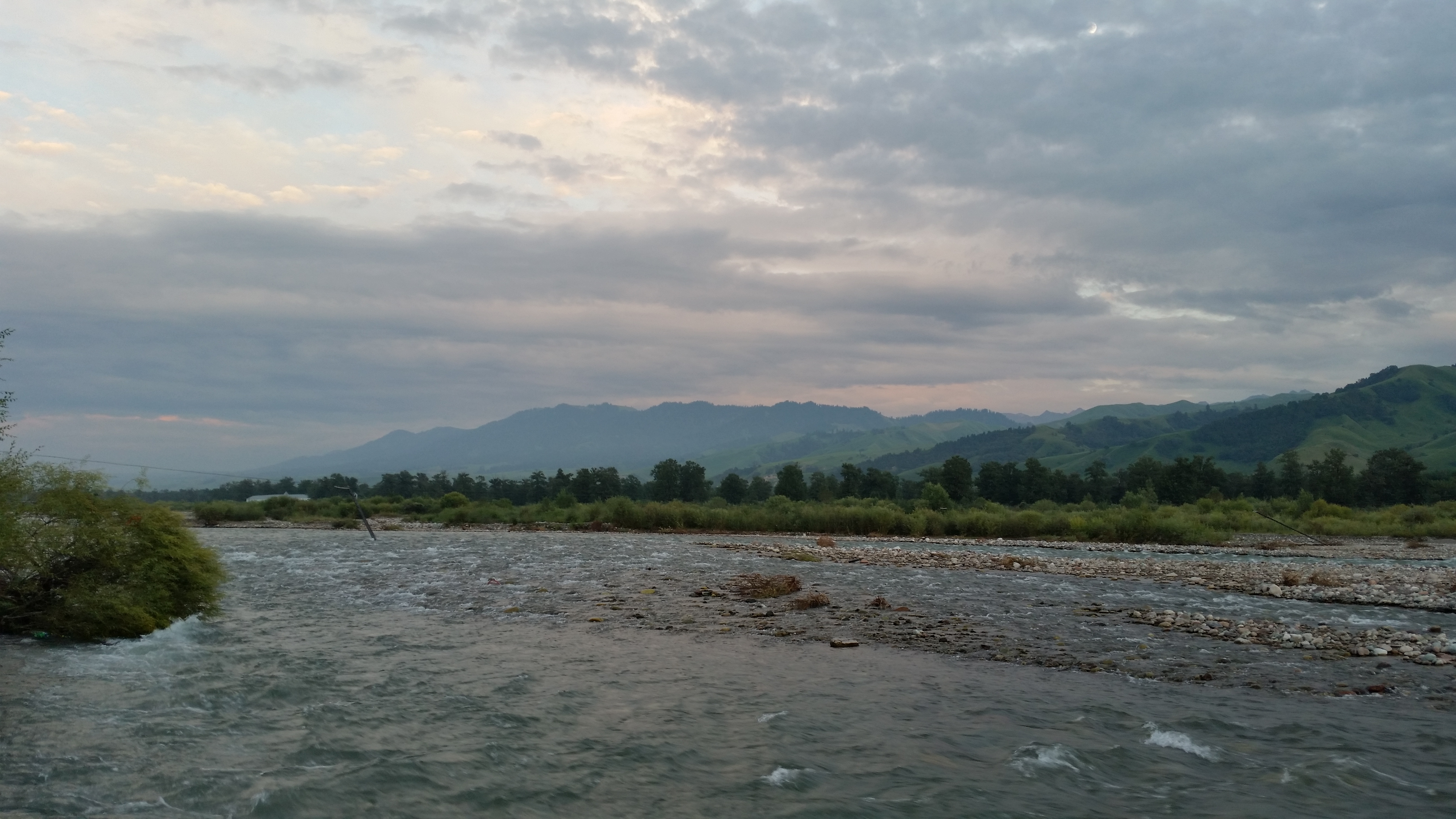
- View of the Künes River at Nalati

Uyghur name
- Uyghur: دەرياسى كۈنەس
Transcriptions
- Latin Yëziqi: Künes deryasi
- Yengi Yeziⱪ: Künəs dəryasi
- SASM/GNC: Künas Nahiyisi
- Siril Yëziqi: Күнәс дәряси

Chinese name
- Traditional Chinese: 鞏乃斯河
- Simplified Chinese: 巩乃斯河
Transcriptions
Standard Mandarin
- Hanyu Pinyin: Gǒngnǎisī Hé
- Wade–Giles: K'ung-nai-ssu Ho

The Künes River (Uyghur: دەرياسى كۈنەس, Künəs Dəryasi), generally known in English as the Kunges River (Russian: Кунгес; Chinese: 巩乃斯河, Gǒngnǎisī Hé), is—with the Tekes River—one of the two main tributaries that form the Ili River in China's Xinjiang Uyghur Autonomous Region. It originates in the eastern Tian Shan.

== Geography ==
The Künes or Kunges River originates in the eastern Tianshan in the Eren Habirga Mountains and flows from east to west to merge with the Tekes River and form the Ili. It flows through glacial, alpine, and grassland environments, the latter including semi-arid, dry-steppe, steppe, meadow grassland, and mountain meadow.

=== Tributaries ===
Main tributaries of the Künes River include:

- Arshan (right)
- Merke (aka Borgustaya) (right)
- Ken-su (aka Naryn gol, Kharkhan) (right)
- Bokchurgan gol (right)
- Turgen (right)
- Tsanma (Tsauman gol) (left)

== Settlements ==
Major settlements located on the Künes River include:

- Kunes County seat
