= 2025 wels catfish attacks in the Brombachsee =

Series of fish attacks in Germany

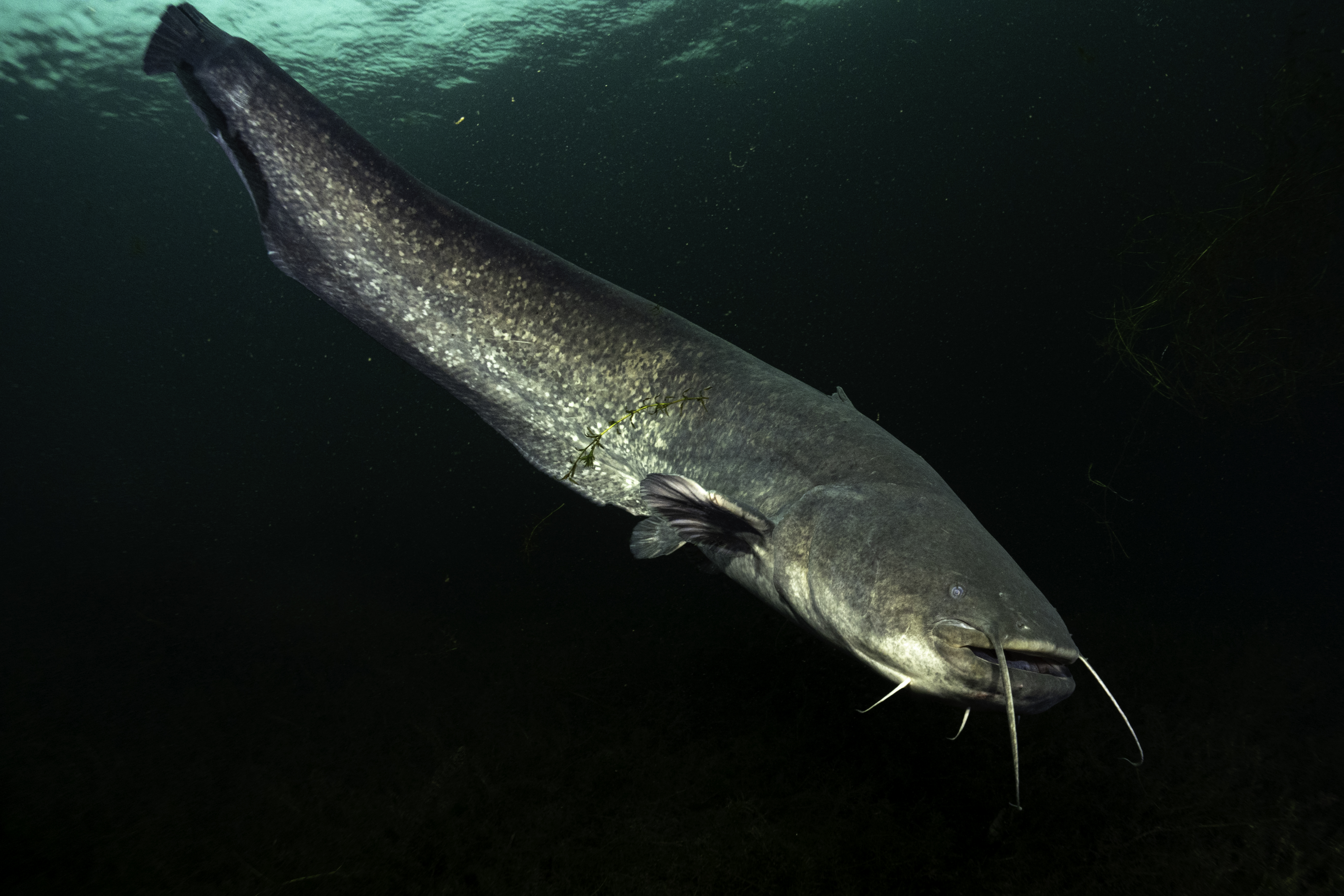
Wels catfish (Silurus glanis), a fish species common in Central Europe, attacked swimmers in the Brombachsee in the summer of 2025.

In the summer of 2025, bathers in the Brombachsee in Middle Franconia, Bavaria were bitten and injured by wels catfish (Silurus glanis). These events led to safety-related measures and received nationwide media coverage in Germany.

== Background ==
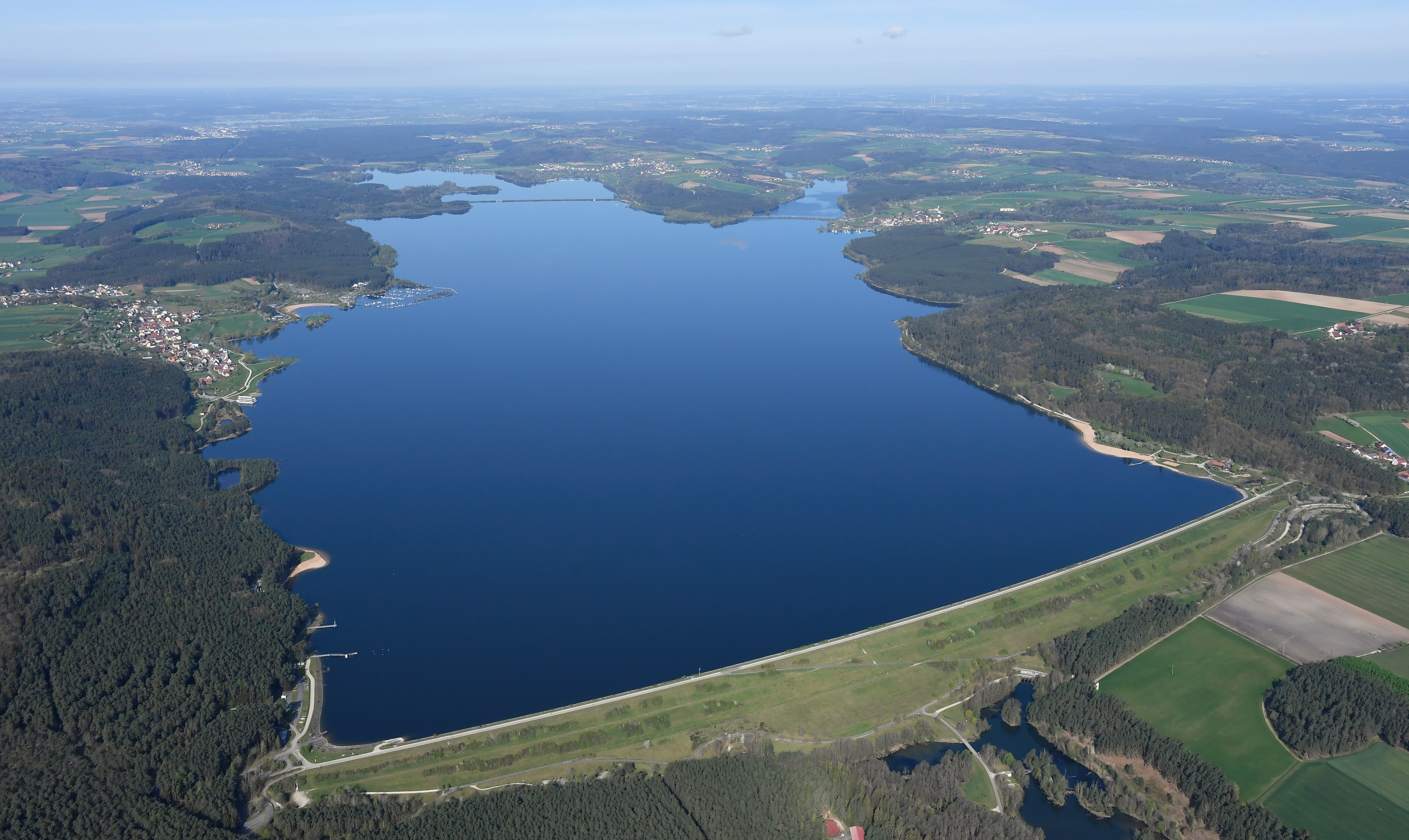
Großer Brombachsee in Middle Franconia, scene of the first catfish attack at the "Burning Beach" festival (bottom right); the second incident occurred in the neighboring lake Kleiner Brombach behind the left dam above – on the Absberg peninsula jutting into the lake

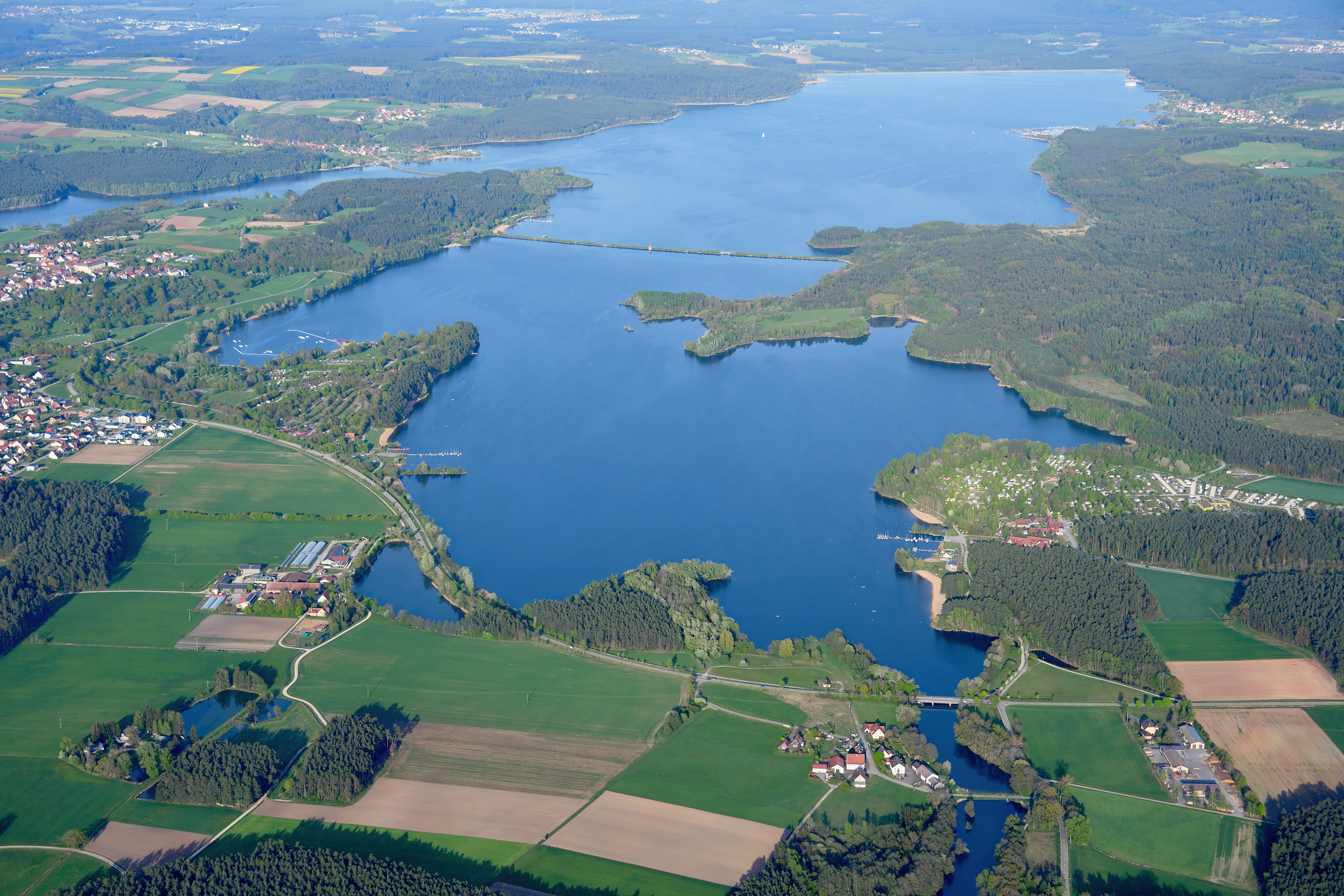
Kleiner Brombachsee, scene of the second catfish attack on the Absberg peninsula, which juts out into the lake (left in the picture)

The Großer Brombachsee is an artificial reservoir in Bavaria and part of the Franconian Lake District. Together with its two forebays, the Kleiner Brombachsee and the Igelsbachsee, it forms the Brombachsee, one of the largest reservoirs in southern Germany. It serves as a water control and recreational area and is one of the most popular bathing lakes in the region.

The wels catfish is considered a nocturnal and crepuscular predator that usually stays in deeper waters during the day. This species typically avoids contact with humans. Individual specimens can reach lengths of over two meters and weights of over 100 kilograms.

The catfish is widespread in Bavaria and prefers warm, slow-flowing or stagnant waters. According to the fishing administration, such habitats represent a stable habitat for the species. Spawning pits are built in shallow shore areas, where the male guards the laid eggs for several weeks. During this time, he is sensitive to disturbance and may drive away swimmers approaching the nest. Wels catfish are not considered dangerous to humans. According to the Bavarian State Research Center for Agriculture (LfL), they only have hackle or brush teeth, which they use to hold their prey but cannot cause serious injuries. However, contact with a larger specimen may cause superficial skin abrasions, which can be perceived as unpleasant or painful. Hectic movements or vigorous splashing could either scare the animals away or attract their attention.

== Events ==
At the end of June 2025, five people were bitten and injured by a catfish approximately two meters long near a floating raft in the Brombachsee near Allmannsdorf near Pleinfeld. The animal was estimated to have weighed around 90 kilograms. The attacks occurred near the shore and resulted in minor to moderate injuries. Emergency services then deliberately attempted to kill the catfish to prevent further incidents and rule out the potential danger of panic-induced drowning. Since the animal did not die immediately, it was later rescued from the water by two anglers and killed. The fish was then butchered and served in a regional inn in approximately 120 fillet portions. The retail price per dish was 22.50€.

On July 3, 2025, another incident occurred in which a man was bitten in the arm near a floating raft near Absberg. According to police, the floating raft was subsequently removed.

Subsequently, the Ansbach public prosecutor's office initiated an investigation because a police officer was involved in the catfish's killing. The animal rights organization PETA and a private individual filed a criminal complaint. Due to the involvement of a police officer, the Bavarian LKA is responsible for conducting the investigation.

Contrary to previous media reports, the Central Franconia police claimed that the catfish was not killed directly by police fire. Although an officer fired his service weapon at the animal, it is unclear whether the fish was actually hit. The police emphasized that they never explicitly stated that the animal died from the shot; such assumptions arose from their interpretation of the official press release. The dead animal was later recovered by two anglers using a boat.

Emergency services deemed simply dispersing the fish insufficient, as it was likely that it would return to its spawning grounds. Retrieving the fish by fishing was also deemed impractical, as catching it could have taken an unpredictable amount of time. Due to the music festival taking place at the same time with several thousand visitors, a longer-term closure of the affected shoreline area seemed infeasible. The authorities justified their actions by citing the potential threat to public safety from panic-induced accidents in the water.

== Causes ==
Experts suspect that the wels catfish's unusually aggressive behavior was triggered by their breeding behavior. During spawning season, males sometimes defend their clutches territorially. However, direct bites against humans are unusual and considered a rare behavior. The attacks occurred in temporal and spatial proximity to floating rafts, which may have been located near clutches. An electronic music festival ("Burning Beach") at the lake in June may have influenced the behavior of the catfish, as fish perceive sounds through various sensory organs and low-frequency sounds can trigger stress.

According to fishery ecologist Robert Arlinghaus, a professor at Humboldt University in Berlin, these incidents are not exceptional occurrences, but rather natural behaviors favored by changing environmental conditions. In particular, lower water levels and warmer temperatures due to climate change are causing catfish to spawn in areas of the water that are more accessible to humans. This increases the likelihood of encounters between bathers and breeding fish. Outside of the spawning season, however, catfish do not exhibit aggressive behavior toward humans.

The breeding season of the wels catfish usually ends in July. The specimen found in the Absberg area may have been a late-spawning animal.

== Reactions ==
The incidents prompted safety measures by the responsible authorities. In addition to removing individual floating rafts, additional warning signs or exclusion zones were discussed. According to the Weißenburg District Office, echo sounder surveys by local fishermen had not detected any additional catfish in the area of the bathing areas. The events were covered in the media across Germany and also sparked debates about the behavior of large fish in heavily frequented waters. In social networks, some people reacted satirically to this.

Die Zeit described the events at the Brombachsee as a silly season story, but also a political lesson of Shakespearean quality.

== See also ==
- Harambe
