= Xinyuan Nalati Airport =

Xinyuan Nalati Airport 新源那拉提机场 كۈنەس نارات ئايروپورتى
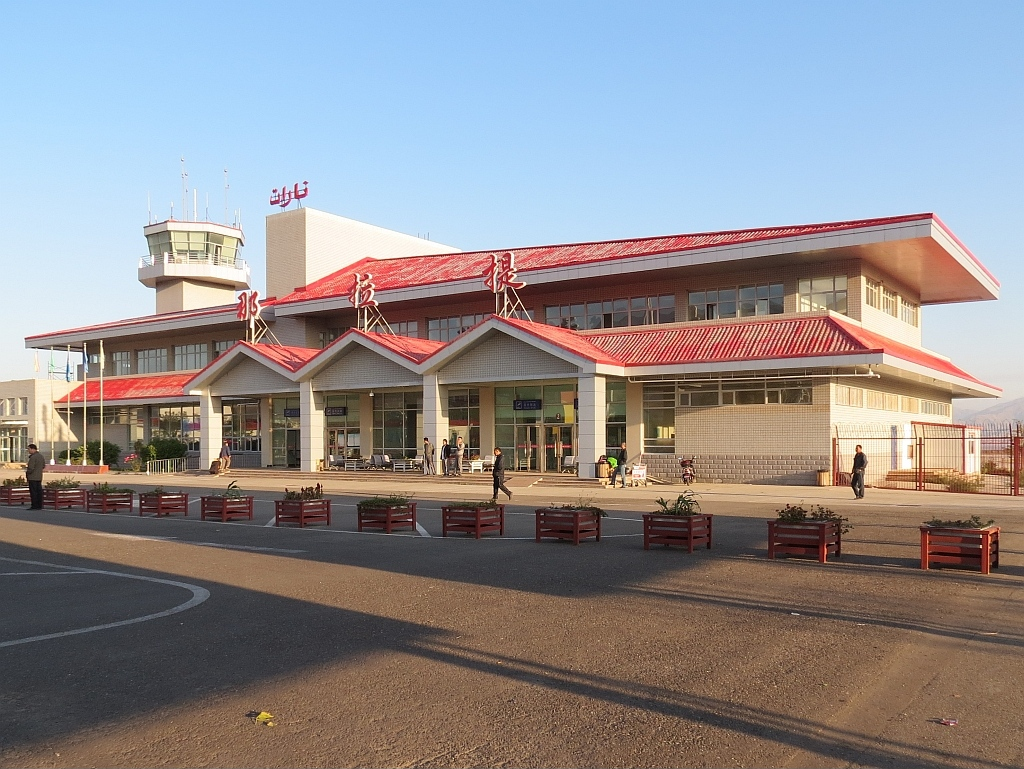
- IATA: NLT; ICAO: ZWNL

Summary
- Airport type: Public
- Serves: Xinyuan County, Xinjiang, China
- Coordinates: 43°25′59″N 83°22′49″E

Map
- Location of airport in Xinjiang

Runways
| Direction | Length | | Surface |
| Direction | m | ft | Surface |
|---|---|---|---|
| 08/26 | 2,300 | 7,546 | Asphalt |

Statistics (2021)
- Passengers: 39,031
- Aircraft movements: 533
- Cargo (metric tons): 3.9

Xinyuan Nalati Airport
- Simplified Chinese: 新源那拉提机场
- Traditional Chinese: 新源那拉提機場
Transcriptions
Standard Mandarin
- Hanyu Pinyin: Xīnyuán Nàlātí Jīchǎng

Xinyuan Nalati Airport (IATA: NLT, ICAO: ZWNL) is an airport that mainly serves tourists to the Nalati scenic area in Xinjiang Uyghur Autonomous Region, China. The airport is 58 kilometers from Nalati and 12 kilometers from Xinyuan County (Künes County) in Ili Kazakh Autonomous Prefecture. The airport was opened in 2005.

== Airlines and destinations ==
| Airlines | Destinations |
|---|---|
| Tianjin Airlines | Ürümqi |

== See also ==
- List of airports in China
- List of the busiest airports in China
