= Xinyuan County =

Xinyuan County 新源县 (Chinese) كۈنەس ناھىيىسى (Uyghur) كۇنەس اۋدانى (Kazakh) Künas County
- County
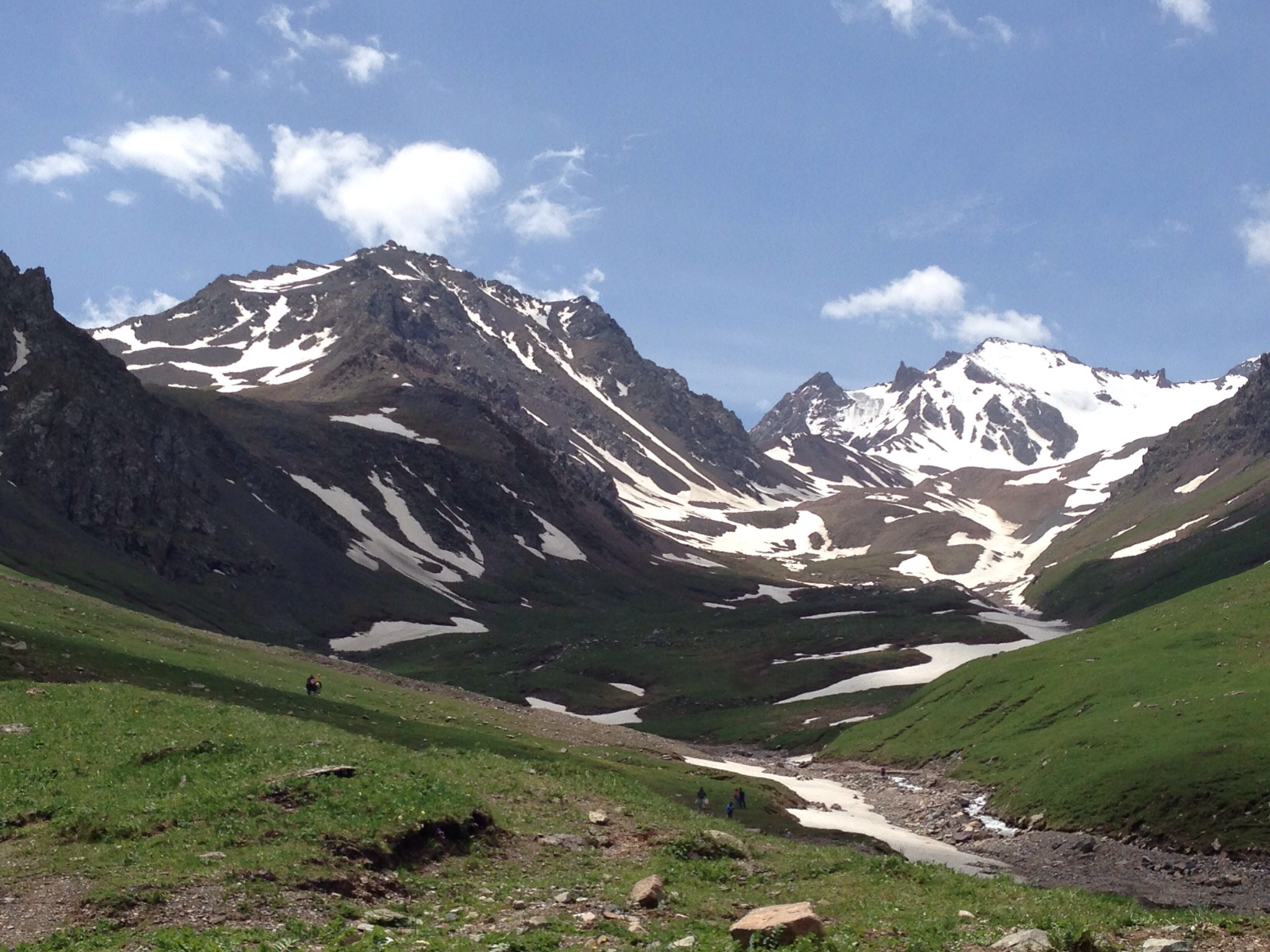
- A snowy valley in Xinyuan

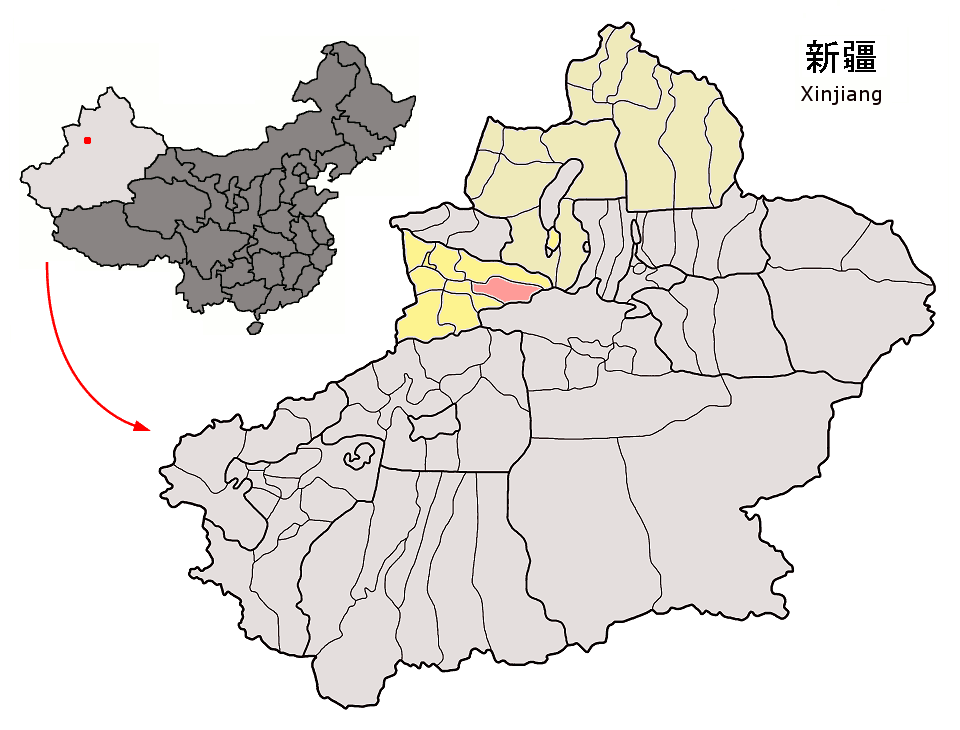
- Xinyuan County (red) within Ili Prefecture (yellow) and Xinjiang

- Location of the seat in Xinjiang Xinyuan (Xinjiang) Xinyuan (China)
- Coordinates: 43°26′02″N 83°13′58″E
- Country: China
- Autonomous region: Xinjiang
- Autonomous prefecture: Ili
- County seat: Künes Town

Area
  - Total: 7,401 km^{2} (2,858 sq mi)

Population (2020)
  - Total: 306,525
  - Density: 41.42/km^{2} (107.3/sq mi)
- Time zone: UTC+8 (China Standard (Note: Locals in Xinjiang frequently observe UTC+6 (Xinjiang Time), 2 hours behind Beijing.))
- Website: www.xinyuan.gov.cn

Xinyuan

Chinese name
- Simplified Chinese: 新源县
- Traditional Chinese: 新源縣
Transcriptions
Standard Mandarin
- Hanyu Pinyin: Xīnyuán Xiàn

Alternative Chinese name
- Simplified Chinese: 巩乃斯县
- Traditional Chinese: 鞏乃斯縣
Transcriptions
Standard Mandarin
- Hanyu Pinyin: Gǒngnǎisī Xiàn

Uyghur name
- Uyghur: كۈنەس ناھىيىسى
Transcriptions
- Latin Yëziqi: Künes Nahiyisi
- Yengi Yeziⱪ: Künəs Naⱨiyisi
- SASM/GNC: Künas Nahiyisi
- Siril Yëziqi: Күнәс Наһийиси

Kazakh name
- Kazakh: كۇنەس اۋدانى

Oirat name
- Oirat: ᡍᡈᡊᡎᡉᠰ ᠱᡅᡕᠠᠨ

Xinyuan County (Chinese: 新源县) as the official romanized name, also transliterated from Uyghur as Künas County (Uyghur: كۈنەس ناھىيىسى; Chinese: 巩乃斯县; pinyin: Gǒngnǎisī xiàn), is a county in the Xinjiang Uyghur Autonomous Region and is under the administration of the Ili Kazakh Autonomous Prefecture. It contains an area of 7,581 km^{2}. According to the 2002 census, it has a population of 290,000. The county is served by Xinyuan Nalati Airport.

== Name ==
The county's original name Künes was changed into Xinyuan in 1946 after the county established its seat on the Künes River (Gǒngnǎisī Hé) upstream. "Xinyuan" means "New Headstream" in Chinese.

== Administrative divisions ==
Xinyuan County is divided into 9 towns and 2 townships.

Name	Simplified Chinese	Hanyu Pinyin	Uyghur (UEY)	Uyghur Latin (ULY)	Kazakh (Arabic script)	Kazakh (Cyrillic script)	Number of communities	Population (thousand)	Land area (km2)
Towns
Künes Town	新源镇	Xīnyuán Zhèn	كۈنەس بازىرى	künes baziri	كۇنەس قالاشىعى		10	51.5	270
Zëkti Town	则克台镇	Zékètái Zhèn	زېكتى بازىرى	zëkti baziri	زەكتى قالاشىعى		6	24.6	503
Araltope Town	阿热勒托别镇	Ārèlètuōbié Zhèn	ئارالتۆپە بازىرى	Araltöpe baziri	ارالتوبە قالاشىعى		7	27	897.7
Taldi Town	塔勒德镇	Tǎlèdé Zhèn	تالدى بازىرى	taldi baziri	تالدى قالاشىعى		11	23.4	1,164.3
Narat Town	那拉提镇	Nàlātí Zhèn	نارات بازىرى	narat baziri	نارات قالاشىعى		9	27.6	1,984
Shorbulaq Town	肖尔布拉克镇	Xiào'ěrbùlākè Zhèn	شوربۇلاق بازىرى	shorbulaq baziri	سوربۇلاق قالاشىعى		8	9.3	268
Qarabora Town	喀拉布拉镇	Kālābùlā Zhèn	قارابورا بازىرى	qarabora baziri	قارابۇرا قالاشىعى		8	20.6	633.3
Almali Town	阿勒玛勒镇	Ālèmǎlè Zhèn	ئالمالى بازىرى	Almali baziri	المالى قالاشىعى		5	16	72
Kengsu Town	坎苏镇	Kǎnsū Zhèn	كەڭسۇ بازىرى	kengsu baziri	كەڭسۋ قالاشىعى		5	10.9	374.3
Townships
Beshtope Township	别斯托别乡	Biésītuōbié Xiāng	بەشتۆپە يېزىسى	beshtöpe yëzisi	بەستوبە قالاشىعى		15	28.9	783
Turgen Township	吐尔根乡	Tǔ'ěrgēn Xiāng	تۈرگېن يېزىسى	türgën yëzisi	تۇرگەن قالاشىعى		3	11.5	200

== Demographics ==
Breakdown of nationalities in Xinyuan County
Nationality	Percentage
Kazakhs	47.36%
Han	33.18%
Uyghurs	10.86%
Hui	7.24%
Others	1.36%
Source of the population statistics :

Note:

- 1. On October 21, 2014, with the approval of the Xinjiang Uygur Autonomous Region People's Government, it was renamed the original Almali Township to Almali Town.
- 2. On July 13, 2016, with the approval of the Xinjiang Uygur Autonomous Region People's Government, it was renamed the original Kansu Township to Kansu Town.
- 3. On March 30, 2012, with the approval of the People's Government of the Xinjiang Uygur Autonomous Region, the original Karabora Township was renamed Karabora Town.

== Climate ==
Climate data for Xinyuan, elevation 928 m (3,045 ft), (1991–2020 normals, extremes 1991–present)
Month	Jan	Feb	Mar	Apr	May	Jun	Jul	Aug	Sep	Oct	Nov	Dec	Year
Record high °C (°F)	13.3 (55.9)	16.3 (61.3)	28.5 (83.3)	35.1 (95.2)	34.7 (94.5)	34.7 (94.5)	38.2 (100.8)	39.5 (103.1)	35.9 (96.6)	32.0 (89.6)	24.3 (75.7)	14.2 (57.6)	39.5 (103.1)
Mean daily maximum °C (°F)	−0.6 (30.9)	2.2 (36.0)	10.9 (51.6)	19.9 (67.8)	24.1 (75.4)	27.3 (81.1)	29.6 (85.3)	29.4 (84.9)	25.3 (77.5)	17.8 (64.0)	8.5 (47.3)	1.4 (34.5)	16.3 (61.4)
Daily mean °C (°F)	−5.8 (21.6)	−2.9 (26.8)	4.8 (40.6)	12.6 (54.7)	17.0 (62.6)	20.3 (68.5)	22.1 (71.8)	21.5 (70.7)	17.4 (63.3)	10.3 (50.5)	2.9 (37.2)	−3.5 (25.7)	9.7 (49.5)
Mean daily minimum °C (°F)	−9.7 (14.5)	−6.8 (19.8)	0.2 (32.4)	7.0 (44.6)	11.2 (52.2)	14.5 (58.1)	15.9 (60.6)	15.1 (59.2)	11.0 (51.8)	5.0 (41.0)	−1.0 (30.2)	−7.1 (19.2)	4.6 (40.3)
Record low °C (°F)	−25.7 (−14.3)	−21.5 (−6.7)	−15.9 (3.4)	−8.0 (17.6)	−0.4 (31.3)	4.7 (40.5)	6.0 (42.8)	3.3 (37.9)	0.4 (32.7)	−7.5 (18.5)	−15.6 (3.9)	−24.7 (−12.5)	−25.7 (−14.3)
Average precipitation mm (inches)	19.1 (0.75)	20.5 (0.81)	35.1 (1.38)	70.0 (2.76)	75.0 (2.95)	65.3 (2.57)	59.4 (2.34)	44.4 (1.75)	33.7 (1.33)	40.5 (1.59)	44.0 (1.73)	26.8 (1.06)	533.8 (21.02)
Average precipitation days (≥ 0.1 mm)	7.0	8.0	9.4	10.9	12.1	12.4	11.6	9.0	7.2	7.9	9.3	8.5	113.3
Average snowy days	8.9	10.1	6.1	1.8	0.2	0	0	0	0	1.6	6.9	10.1	45.7
Average relative humidity (%)	67	69	63	54	54	58	58	55	53	59	68	70	61
Mean monthly sunshine hours	171.8	177.1	218.2	236.1	280.5	282.0	298.8	293.3	260.9	226.0	160.9	147.9	2,753.5
Percentage possible sunshine	58	59	58	58	61	61	65	69	71	68	57	53	62
Source: China Meteorological Administration
