= Sarkand District =

Coordinates: 45°29′24″N 79°55′48″E

Sarkand
- District
- Сарқан ауданы
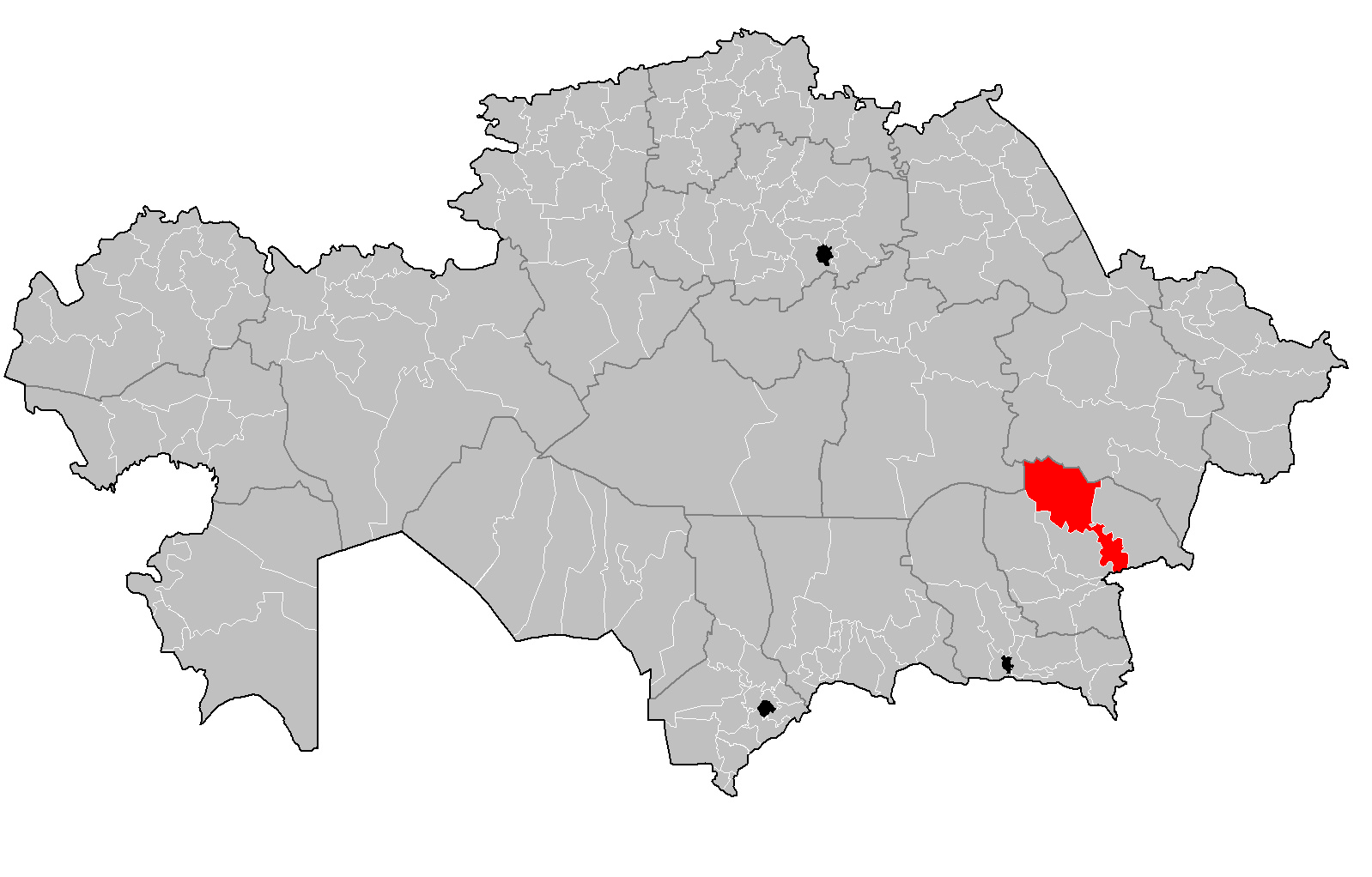
- Country: Kazakhstan
- Region: Jetisu Region
- Administrative center: Sarkand
- Founded: 1928

Government
  - Akim (mayor): Mamanbayev Galymzhan Kanatovich

Area
  - Total: 9,400 sq mi (24,400 km^{2})

Population (2013)
  - Total: 40,683
- Time zone: UTC+6 (East)

Sarkand District or Sarkant District (Kazakh: Сарқан ауданы, Sarqan audany) is a district of Jetisu Region in Kazakhstan. The administrative center of the district is the town of Sarkand. Population: 40,683 (2013 estimate); 41,016 (2009 census results); 47,808 (1999 census results).

== History ==
It was formed on September 3, 1928 with the center of the village of Sarkand in the Alma-Ata district on the territory of the Lepsinsky district and the Cherkasy volost. On December 17, 1930, the district was disbanded and transferred to the Aksu and Lepsinsky districts. On January 9, 1935, the Sarkand region was restored with the center in the village. Sarkand is part of the Alma-Ata region.

== See also ==
- Jetisu Region
- Sarkand
- Taldykorgan
- Bakaly
