= Jetisu Region =

Jetisu Region Жетісу облысы (Kazakh) Жетысуская область (Russian)
- Region
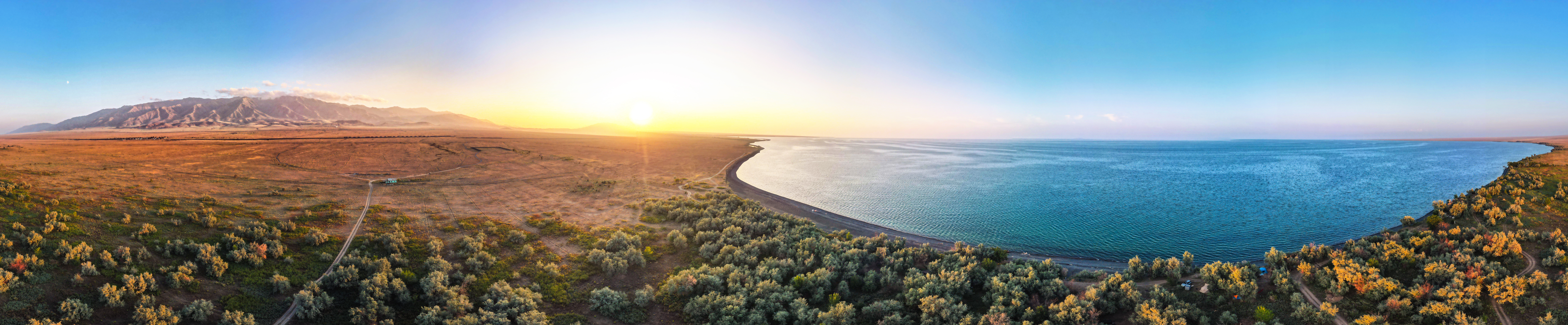
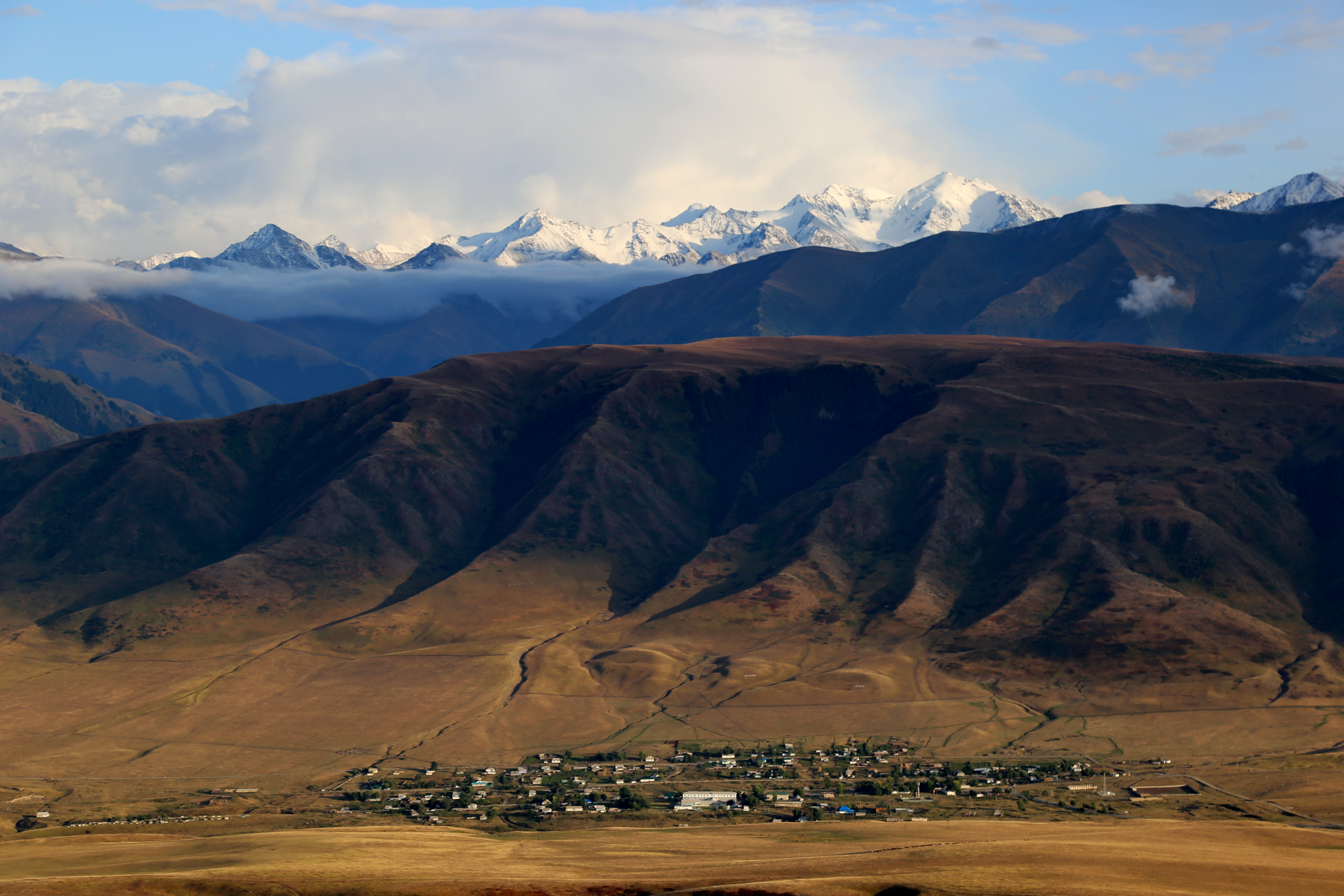
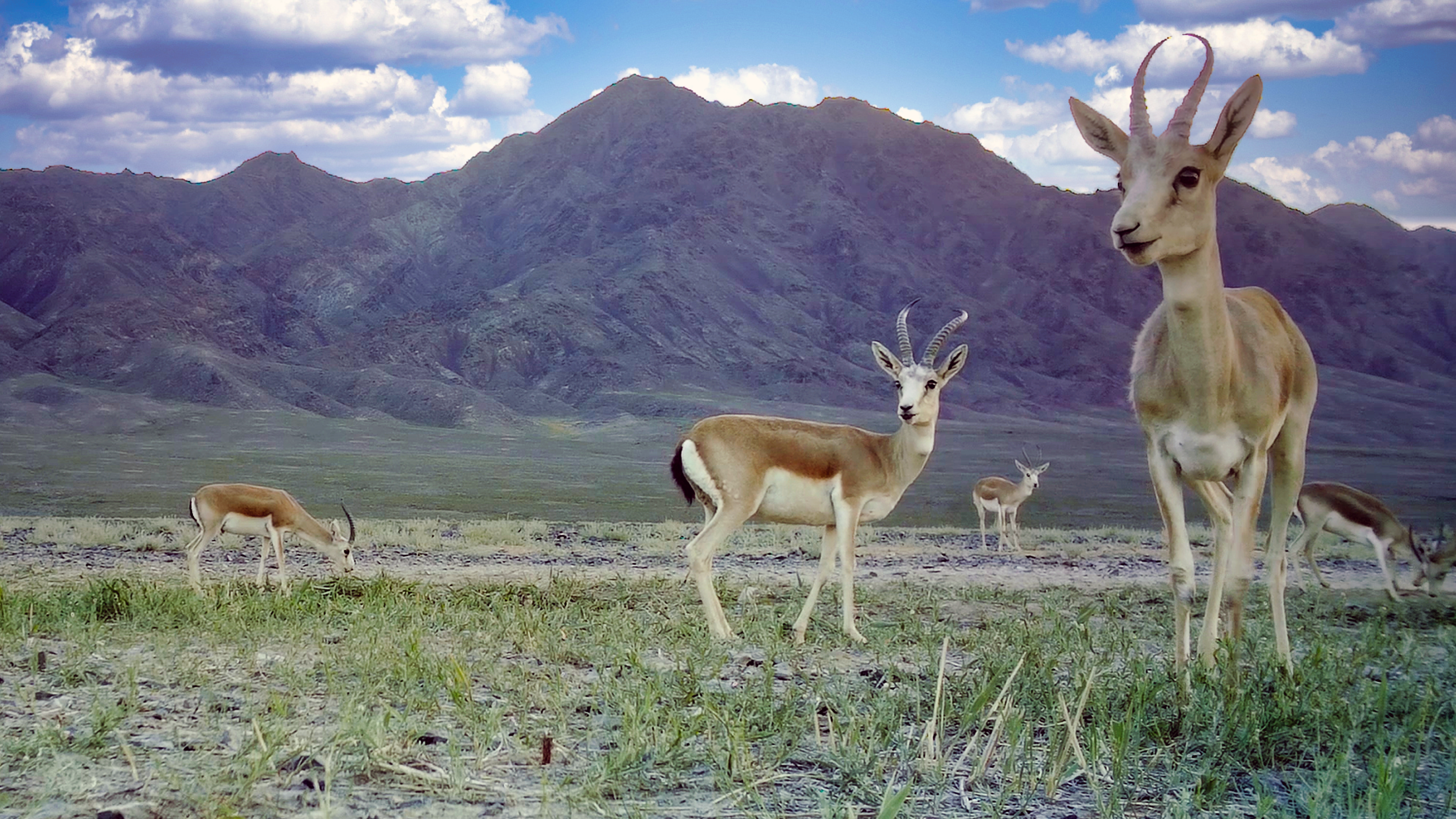
- From the top, Alakol Biosphere Reserve, Sarkand District, Altyn-Emel National Park

- Flag Coat of arms

- Map of Kazakhstan, location of Jetisu Region highlighted
- Coordinates: 45°01′N 78°22′E
- Country: Kazakhstan
- Administrative center: Taldykorgan
- Established: 8 June 2022

Government
  - Akim: Beibit Isabayev

Area
  - Total: 118,500 km^{2} (45,800 sq mi)

Population (2021)
  - Total: 650,000

GDP (Nominal, 2024)
  - Total: KZT 2,115 billion (US$ 4.441 billion) · 20th
  - Per capita: KZT 3,038,000 (US$ 6,380)
- Time zone: UTC+5

Jetisu Region (Note: Kazakh: Жетісу облысы, romanized: Jetısu oblysy, IPA: [ʒʲetɘˈsu wobɫɤˈsɤ]; Russian: Жетысуская область) formerly spelled Zhetysu Region, is one of the Regions of Kazakhstan. Its administrative center is Taldykorgan. Total area of the region is 118,500 km².

Kazakh President Kassym-Jomart Tokayev announced on March 16, 2022 that the region would be created. The area split off from Almaty Region when Tokayev's decree came into force on June 8, 2022. The administrative center of the region is Taldykorgan, and the center of Almaty Region was moved to Qonayev. On June 11, 2022, Beibit Isabayev was appointed as akim of the region. The region's borders roughly correspond to the old Taldykorgan Region which was liquidated in 1997 and merged with Almaty Region.

It is named after the historical Zhetysu region of Central Asia, which is primarily situated within the modern-day region.
