= Omsk Time =

Time zone in Russia (UTC+6)

- Time zone

UTC offset
- OMST: UTC+06:00

Current time
- 11:17, 28 January 2026 OMST [refresh]

Observance of DST
- DST is not observed in this time zone.

Time in Russia: KALT / Kaliningrad Time / UTC+2 / (MSK−1); MSK / Moscow Time / UTC+3 / (MSK±0); SAMT / Samara Time / UTC+4 / (MSK+1); YEKT / Yekaterinburg Time / UTC+5 / (MSK+2); OMST / Omsk Time / UTC+6 / (MSK+3); KRAT / Krasnoyarsk Time / UTC+7 / (MSK+4); IRKT / Irkutsk Time / UTC+8 / (MSK+5); YAKT / Yakutsk Time / UTC+9 / (MSK+6); VLAT / Vladivostok Time / UTC+10 / (MSK+7); MAGT / Magadan Time / UTC+11 / (MSK+8); PETT / Kamchatka Time / UTC+12 / (MSK+9)

Omsk Time (OMST) is a time zone in Russia that is six hours ahead of UTC (UTC+06:00), and 3 hours ahead of Moscow Time (MSK). It is used in Omsk Oblast.

== History ==
Until 1991, Omsk Time was one of the two time zones used in Soviet Central Asia. In addition to Omsk Oblast in the Russian SFSR, it covered the eastern two thirds of Kazakh SSR, all of Kyrgyz and Tajik SSRs, and eastern Uzbek SSR. This included the city of Omsk and the capitals Alma-Ata (Almaty), Frunze (Bishkek), Dushanbe and Tashkent.

For two years after the collapse of the Soviet Union, Omsk Oblast remained the only region in Russia in this time zone. The newly independent Central Asian states ceased to observe daylight saving time, while Uzbekistan and Tajikistan in addition "moved west" by adjusting the clocks one hour back.

From the 1990s to the 2010s, Russia experienced a countrywide wave of clock shifts towards Moscow. By 2010, all Western Siberia's Moscow+4 regions moved to Moscow+3, merging into Omsk Time.

In 2011, Russia moved to year-round daylight saving time. Instead of switching between UTC+06:00 in winter and UTC+07:00 in summer, Omsk time was set to UTC+07:00 until 2014, when it was reset back to UTC+06:00 year-round, but Kemerovo Oblast decided to stay in UTC+07:00 - Krasnoyarsk Time.

In 2016, Altai Krai, Altai Republic, Tomsk Oblast, and Novosibirsk Oblast switched to Krasnoyarsk Time (UTC+07:00).

Omsk Oblast is now the only part of Russia which uses this time zone.

Changes in area observing Omsk Time
Date	region(s)	Type of change	IANA time zone (tzid)
	Eastern 2/3 Kazakhstan	leave	Asia/Almaty
	East Uzbekistan	leave	Asia/Tashkent
	Tajikistan	leave	Asia/Dushanbe
1993-05-23	Novosibirsk Oblast	join	Asia/Novosibirsk
1995-05-28	Altai Krai and Altai Republic	join	Asia/Novosibirsk
2002-05-01	Tomsk Oblast	join	Asia/Novosibirsk
2010-03-28	Kemerovo Oblast	join	Asia/Novosibirsk
2014	Kemerovo Oblast	leave	Asia/Krasnoyarsk
2016-03-27	Altai Krai and Altai Republic	leave	Asia/Krasnoyarsk
2016-05-29	Tomsk Oblast	leave	Asia/Krasnoyarsk
2016-07-24	Novosibirsk Oblast	leave	Asia/Krasnoyarsk

== IANA time zone database ==
In the zone.tab of the IANA time zone database, the zone with the same current offset is:

c.c.	Coordinates	Timezone name	Comments	UTC offset
RU	+5500+07324	Asia/Omsk	MSK+03 – Omsk	+06:00
