= Dmitry Kuleshov =

Russian serial killer

- Born: Dmitry Yevgenyevich Kuleshov; 27 January 1978 (age 48); Shemonaikha, East Kazakhstan Region, Kazakh SSR
- Other names: "The Spruce Robber"; Dmitry Sidorenko
- Convictions: Murder x3 Child sexual abuse Robbery
- Penalty: 10 years (Larina murder); 25 years imprisonment (Nikogosov murders)

Details
- Victims: 3
- Span of crimes: 1994–2006
- Country: Russia
- State: Rostov
- Date apprehended: 23 December 2006

Dmitry Yevgenyevich Kuleshov (Russian: Дмитрий Евгеньевич Кулешов; born 27 January 1978), known as the Spruce Robber (Russian: Ёлочник, romanized: Yolochnik), is Kazakhstani-born Russian serial killer, rapist and paedophile who murdered two children in Rostov-on-Don in 2006, after being released for a similar murder committed as a teenager in 1994. Convicted and sentenced to 25 years imprisonment for the latter crime, his case sparked outrage over the release of dangerous offenders.

== Life and crimes ==
Dmitry Kuleshov was born on 27 January 1978, in Shemonaikha, a city in the East Kazakhstan Region of the Kazakh SSR. At some point during his childhood, he and his single mother moved to Rostov-on-Don, Rostov Oblast, where they lived together at a one-room apartment on Orbitalnaya Street 80. Little is known about his activities during his youth, but Kuleshov was known to the police for an incident in which he illegally cut down a spruce near the police station for the winter holidays, for which his mother had to pay a fine. Subsequently, investigator Amurkhan Yandiev, who would work on the first murder case involving the teenager, gave him the nickname "The Spruce Robber".

After graduating from school, Kuleshov entered the Rostov College of Water Transport.

=== Murder of Anya Larina ===
On 8 May 1994, 6-year-old Anya Larina, who lived next door to Kuleshov, went missing. He later said after watching the little girl play in the yard, he met her at the entrance and convinced her to come to his apartment, where he proceeded to sexually abuse her. According to Kuleshov, despite experiencing a very traumatizing event, Larina told him that she still intended to tell her parents about it. After asking her several times not to do so, Kuleshov strangled her with a rope and hid the girl's body on the balcony, which he covered with an inflatable float. When his mother returned home, she failed to notice that anything had occurred.

At half past four, police officers arrived at the Kuleshovs' apartment and searched it, but found nothing and then left. Kuleshov waited for the right moment and took the corpse to the fire escape, after which he put the bloodstained laundry in the washing machine. He then threw Larina's bucket and dustpan, as well as the murder weapon, into a garbage can.

While questioning other tenants, investigators eventually crossed paths with Kuleshov, who was found to have no alibi. After talking with the teenager for a couple of hours, investigator Yandiev eventually got him to confess to the murder. During the interrogations, the 16-year-old admitted his guilt and said that his motive for killing Larina was to prevent her from telling her parents that she was raped, and that the indirect cause of the crime was mental distress from bullying at school.

Kuleshov was quickly convicted of the murder, but as he was a minor, he was given a maximum sentence of 10 years imprisonment. This was further reduced to 9 years imprisonment at a later date.

In May 2003, Kuleshov's sentence expired and he was released from prison. He then returned to Rostov-on-Don, married, and had a son.

=== Murders of Artur and Maria Nikogosov ===
On 13 December 2006, the now-28-year-old and unemployed Kuleshov broke into an apartment on Belomorskaya Street, where the 14-year-old Artur and 9-year-old Maria Nikogosova lived with their mother Irina. He had staked out the apartment for at least a week, and at one point stole the key, made a duplicate, and then returned the original to its place. Upon encountering the children, Kuleshov proceeded to rape and ultimately strangled both with a clothesline cord before fleeing the residence. The children's bodies were later found by Irina after she returned home from work. Kuleshov later provided moral support for the victims' mother and even attended the funeral.

Kuleshov was arrested on 23 December after investigators traced a stolen cellphone to him - he had replaced the SIM card in it, believing that it could not be replaced. His guilt was definitively established after a DNA analysis linked semen and sweat traces him to the crime scene, as well as footprints and fibres from the victims' clothes.

Not long after, Kuleshov was charged with two counts of murder, sexual abuse of a minor and robbery. Despite the overwhelming evidence against him, he claimed that he was innocent and that he had only confessed due to pressure from investigators.

Despite his claims, Kuleshov was found guilty on all counts and sentenced to 25 years imprisonment in a strict regime penal colony. In addition, he was also ordered to pay his victims' mother 21,162 rubles in material damages and 3 million rubles for moral harm.

Sometime after 2010, Kuleshov changed his surname to Sidorenko while serving his prison term.

== See also ==
- List of youngest killers
- List of Russian serial killers

== In the media and culture ==
- Kuleshov's first murder was covered in the documentary series Criminal Russia (Russian: Криминальная Россия) in the episode "A Nightmare in a Family Dorm" (Russian: Кошмар в семейном общежитии)
- Another documentary series, "Above the Law" (Russian: Вне закона), also covered the crimes in the episode "City of Maniacs" (Russian: Город маньяков)
