= Zyryan =

Zyryan may refer to:

- For the town in eastern Kazakhstan, see Zyryanovsk.
- For the administrative district of eastern Kazakhstan, see Zyryan District.
- For the ethnic group known as the Komi-Zyrians in pre-Soviet Russia, see Komi people.
- For their language, see Komi-Zyrian language.
