= Urunkhayka =

Village in East Kazakhstan

Urunkhayka Урүнхайка Ürünhaika
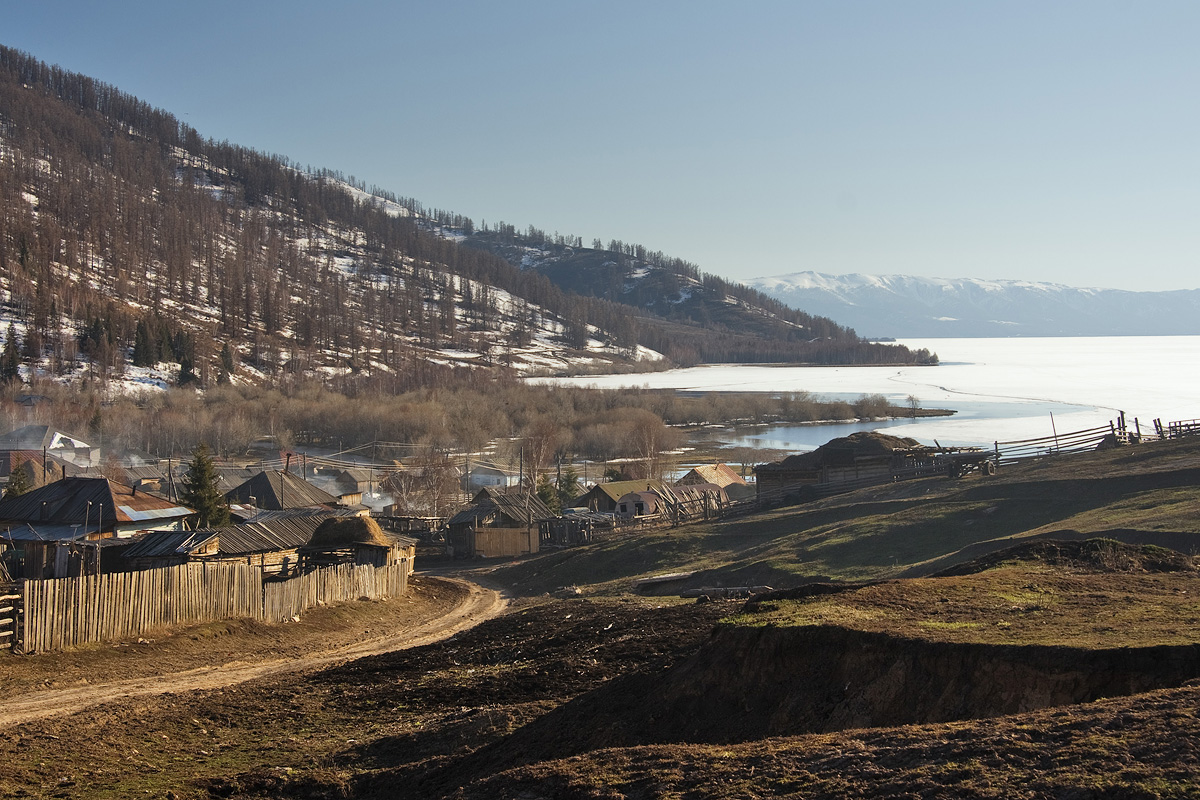

- Location in Kazakhstan
- Coordinates: 48°47′0″N 86°01′31″E
- Country: Kazakhstan
- Region: East Kazakhstan Region
- District: Katonkaragay District
- Elevation: 1,450 m (4,750 ft)

Population
  - Total: 165
- Time zone: ALMT

Urunkhayka (Kazakh: Урүнхайка, Ürünhaika) is a small village in Kazakhstan. It is on the eastern border of Lake Markakol in Katonkaragay District of East Kazakhstan Region.

== Climate ==
Urunkhayka has a subarctic climate (Köppen: Dfc), characterized by extremely cold, snowy winters and cool summers.

Climate data for Urunkhayka (1991–2020)
Month	Jan	Feb	Mar	Apr	May	Jun	Jul	Aug	Sep	Oct	Nov	Dec	Year
Mean daily maximum °C (°F)	−17.1 (1.2)	−12.3 (9.9)	−4.4 (24.1)	5.1 (41.2)	12.7 (54.9)	18.9 (66.0)	20.7 (69.3)	19.6 (67.3)	13.9 (57.0)	6.5 (43.7)	−2.8 (27.0)	−13.0 (8.6)	4.0 (39.2)
Daily mean °C (°F)	−22.2 (−8.0)	−18.2 (−0.8)	−10.7 (12.7)	−0.6 (30.9)	6.7 (44.1)	12.7 (54.9)	14.6 (58.3)	13.2 (55.8)	7.8 (46.0)	1.0 (33.8)	−7.8 (18.0)	−17.6 (0.3)	−1.8 (28.8)
Mean daily minimum °C (°F)	−27.0 (−16.6)	−23.9 (−11.0)	−17.2 (1.0)	−5.7 (21.7)	1.7 (35.1)	7.1 (44.8)	9.1 (48.4)	7.5 (45.5)	2.5 (36.5)	−3.2 (26.2)	−11.3 (11.7)	−21.7 (−7.1)	−6.8 (19.8)
Average precipitation mm (inches)	30.6 (1.20)	28.8 (1.13)	34.2 (1.35)	41.3 (1.63)	49.5 (1.95)	54.2 (2.13)	69.9 (2.75)	63.6 (2.50)	54.2 (2.13)	49.8 (1.96)	49.0 (1.93)	44.6 (1.76)	569.7 (22.43)
Average precipitation days (≥ 1.0 mm)	7.5	7.0	6.5	6.9	8.0	8.1	9.9	8.6	7.7	7.9	8.8	9.6	96.5
Source: NOAA
