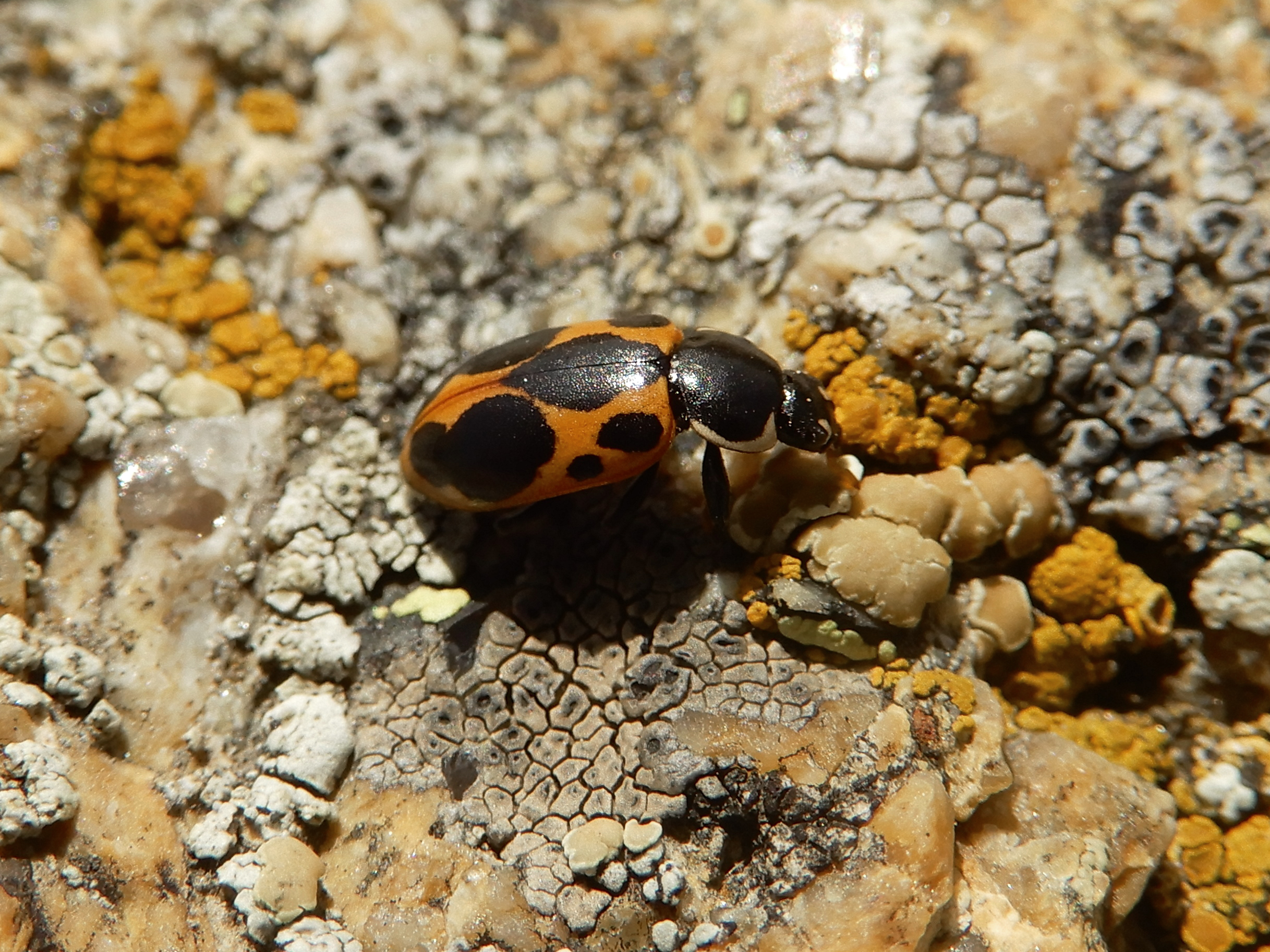
- in Katonkaragay District, Kazakhstan

Scientific classification
- Kingdom: Animalia
- Phylum: Arthropoda
- Clade: Pancrustacea
- Class: Insecta
- Order: Coleoptera
- Suborder: Polyphaga
- Infraorder: Cucujiformia
- Family: Coccinellidae
- Genus: Ceratomegilla
- Species: C. ulkei

Binomial name
- Ceratomegilla ulkei Crotch, 1873

Synonyms
- Spiladelpha barovskii Semenov & Dobzhansky, 1922; Spiladelpha kiritshenkoi Barovsky, 1925; Spiladelpha longula Barovsky, 1925; Hippodamia parva Watson, 1954

= Ceratomegilla ulkei =

Species of beetle

Ceratomegilla ulkei is a species of lady beetle in the family Coccinellidae. It is found in Europe and Northern Asia (excluding China) and North America, where it has been recorded from Alaska, British Columbia, the Northwest Territories, Ontario and Yukon.

== Description ==
Adults reach a length of about 3.70-4.70 mm. They have a black head with two yellow spots. The pronotum is black with a yellow lateral margin. The elytron is black with pale margins, but this pattern is variable.
