= Katon-Karagay National Park =

National park in Kazakhstan

- IUCN category II (national park)
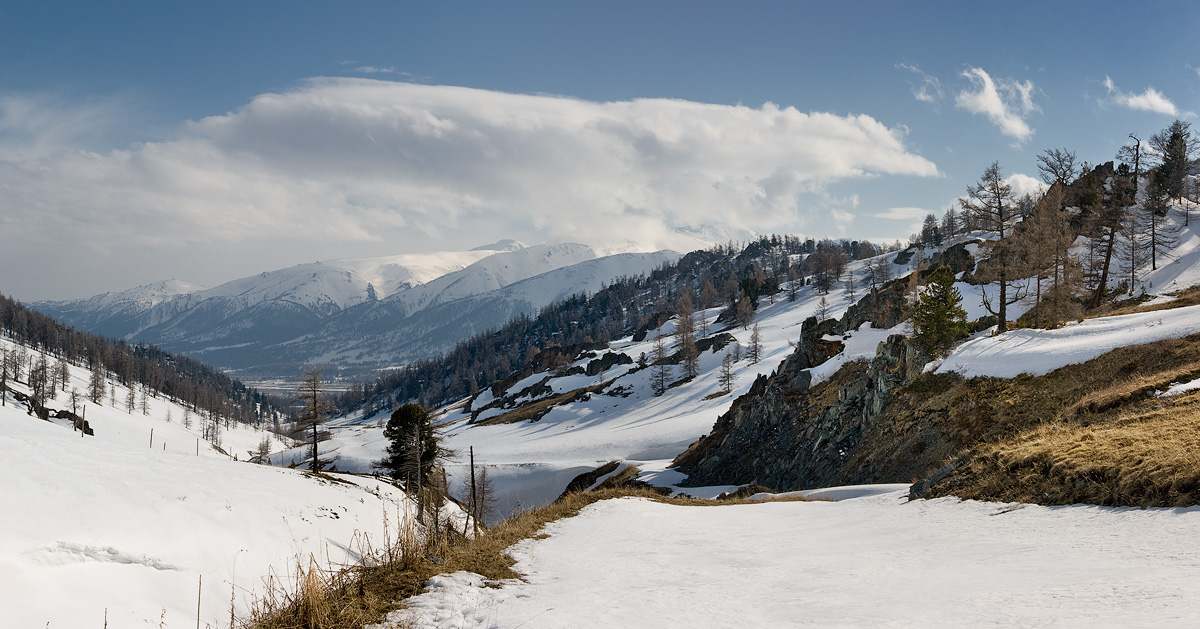
- Burkhat pass, border of Sarymsakty and Tarbagatay mountains ranges, East Kazakhstan

- Location within Kazakhstan
- Location: East Kazakhstan Region
- Coordinates: 49.3°N 86.6°E
- Area: 643,477 ha (1,590,066 acres; 6,435 km^{2}; 2,484 sq mi)
- Established: 2001
- Governing body: Committee of Forestry and Fauna of the Ministry of Agriculture, Kazakhstan

Katon-Karagay National Park (Kazakh: Катонқараға́й мемлекетті́к ұлтты́қ табиғи́ паркі́, romanized: Katonqarağai memlekettık ūlttyq tabiği parkı) is the largest national park in Kazakhstan, located on the eastern edge of the country, in the Southern Altai Mountains. The park fills the western side of the "X" where the borders of Kazakhstan, Russia, China, and Mongolia meet. The highest peak in the South Siberian Mountains (Belukha Mountain, 4,506 m (14,783 ft)), is on the Russian border in the Katun Range. The park is in Katonkaragay District of East Kazakhstan Region, 1,000 kilometres (620 mi) southeast of the capital city of Astana.

Created on June 1, 2001, the park was included in the transnational park "Altai" with Russia in 2011. In 2014, the park was included in the new "Katon-Karagay Biosphere Reserve", named by the UNESCO Man-and-Biosphere program.

== Topography ==
Situated on the slopes of the Southern Altai mountains, and skirting the populated areas of the Bukhtarma river valley, the park is mountainous and glaciated, with altitudes often reaching over 3,000 m (9,800 ft). The park is bordered on the north by the Altai Republic of Russia, on the southeast by China, on the west by the Farpusnaya River, and on the south by the northern slopes of the Sarymsakty and Tarbagatai ranges of the Southern Altai Mountains. 34% of the park is forested, the remainder being mountain meadows or rocky slopes and glaciers. The slopes are steep, with terrain formed by the glaciers: trough-shaped valleys, cirques, and moraines. The glacier-fed rivers are steep and energetic. Kokkol Falls, at 80 meters, is the largest waterfall in the Altai Mountains.

== Ecoregion ==
The park is in the Altai alpine meadow and tundra and Altai steppe and semi-desert ecoregions. These ecoregions exhibit the complete altitudinal vegetation zones from steppe to alpine tundra. These ecoregions exhibit very high diversity because they are at the biogeographic divide between Siberia to the north and the cold deserts of Central Asia to the south.

== Climate ==
The climate at mid-level altitudes is "Humid continental climate, cool summer subtype" (Koeppen Classification Dfb, with alpine climate (Koppen ET) above the treeline. Precipitation patterns are affected by the mountainous terrain and altitude zoning. Lower elevations average 386 mm of precipitation per year (maximum in summer). Average temperature ranges from −26 °C (−15 °F) in January to 9.5 °C (49.1 °F) in July.

Altai Region (48.5 N, 88.5 E)

Climate chart (precipitation, max. and min. temperature)
J	F	M	A	M	J	J	A	S	O	N	D
0.2 −3 −26	0.3 −1 −26	0.5 11 −13	0.9 34 11	1.4 49 24	1.7 58 32	2.2 62 36	1.7 61 33	1 50 24	0.7 34 11	0.6 15 −7	0.4 2 −20
- █ Average max. and min. temperatures in °F
- █ Precipitation totals in inches
- Source: globalspecies.org
Metric conversion
J	F	M	A	M	J	J	A	S	O	N	D
5.1 −20 −32	7.6 −18 −32	13 −12 −25	23 1 −12	36 9 −4	43 15 0	56 17 2	43 16 0	25 10 −5	18 1 −12	15 −10 −22	10 −17 −29
- █ Average max. and min. temperatures in °C
- █ Precipitation totals in mm

== Plants and animals ==
The vegetation is arrayed in four general altitude zones.

- The nival zone, at elevations of 2,800 meters and above, supports small communities of lichen and alpine vegetation such as Snow Primrose and Altai Buttercup in the crevices and rocky edges of snowfields and glaciers.
- The Tundra-mountain belt extends from 2,100 meters to 2,800 meters. It features mosses and lichens on the stones, shrubs and grassy tundra, including Altai bluegrass and Honeysuckle.
- The Sub-alpine forest and mountain meadow zone extends from 1,200 to 2,300 meters. The most common trees are Siberian pine, larch, and birch. The meadows feature grasses, sedges, and blueberries.
- The Mountain-forest, meadow-steppe zone is found below 1,200 meters. At this level are birch and larch-aspen forest, and widespread grasses and bushes.

Scientists have recorded 363 species of vertebrates in the park: 284 birds, 65 mammals, 6 reptiles, 2 amphibians, and 6 species of fish. Common mammals include the common and tundra shrew, wolf, fox, roe deer and brown bear.

In January 2021, a camera trap in the Katon-Karagay National Park captured video of a rare snow leopard (Panthera uncia) in the Altai mountains.

== Tourism ==
There are visitor accommodations in the nearby settlements. 24% of the park (1,512 km^{2}) is zoned as a strict nature reserve, the other 76% (4,922 km^{2}) is zoned for recreation, scientific study, and restricted economic activity.

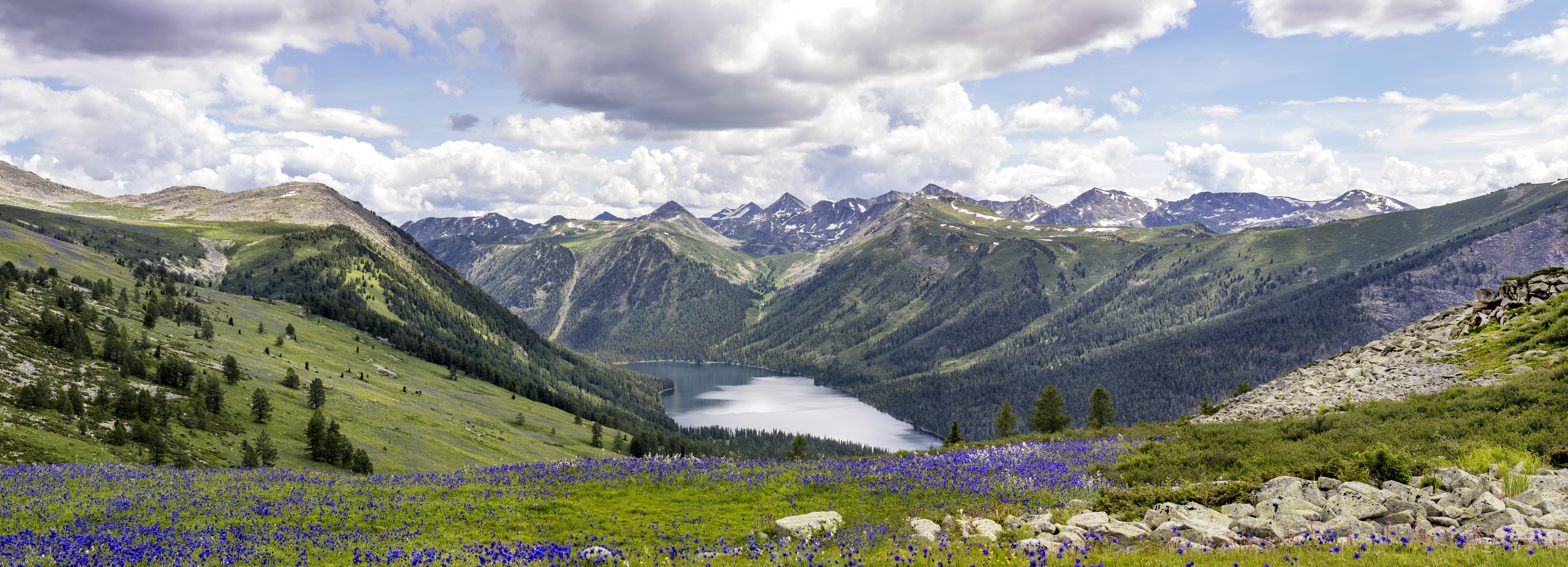
Panoramic view of Radostny pass in Katon-Karagay National Park
