= Lake Markakol =

Lake in Kazakhstan

- Марқакөл
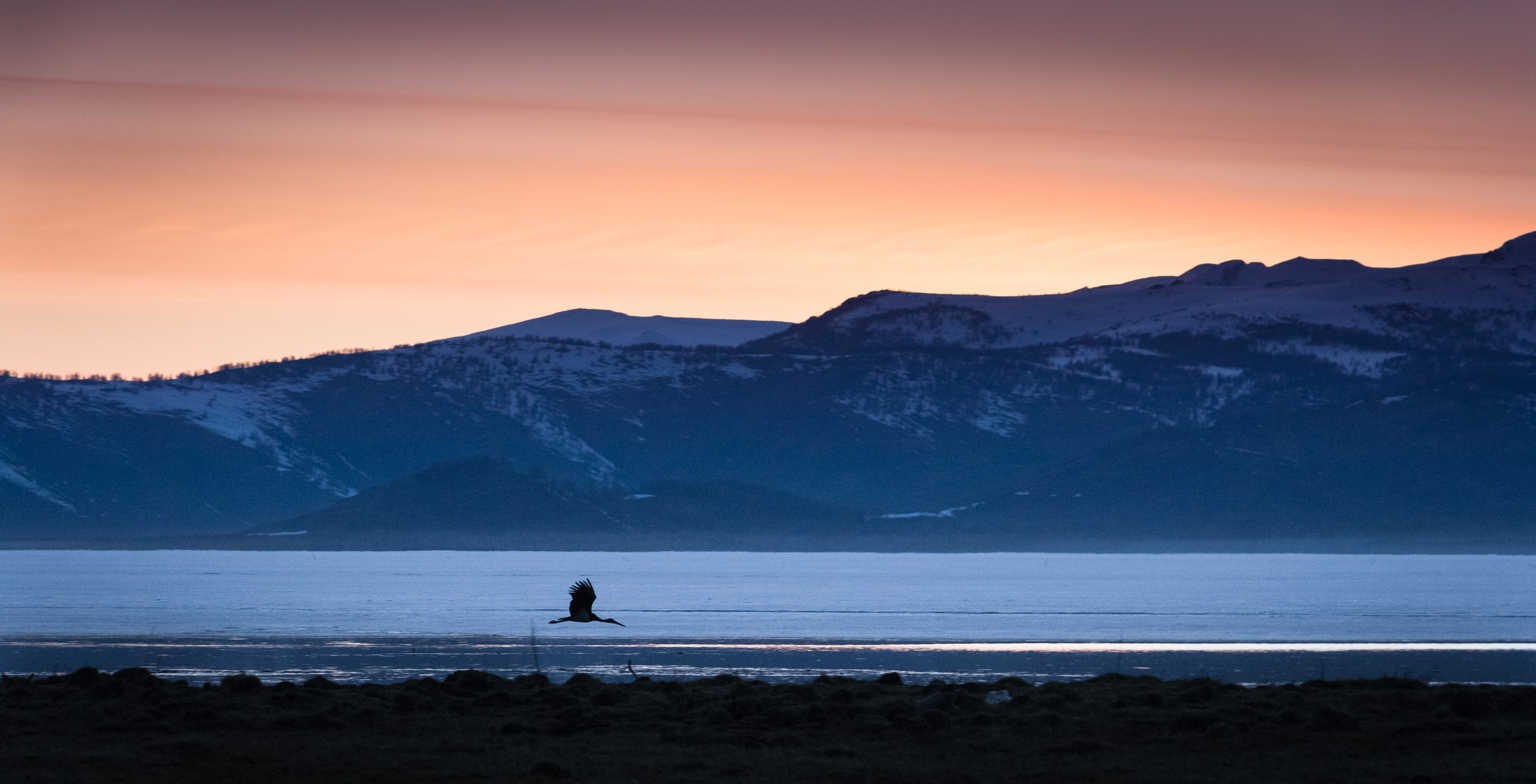

- Location within Kazakhstan Location within Asia

- Map of the area
- Coordinates: 48°45′N 85°45′E
- Primary inflows: Topolevka, Tikhushka, Elovka, Karabulak, Zhirenka
- Primary outflows: Kalzhyr
- Catchment area: 1,180 km^{2} (460 sq mi)
- Basin countries: Kazakhstan
- Max. length: 19 km (12 mi)
- Max. width: 38 km (24 mi)
- Surface area: 455 km^{2} (176 sq mi)
- Average depth: 14 m (46 ft)
- Max. depth: 30 m (98 ft)
- Water volume: 6.5 km^{3} (1.6 cu mi)
- Shore length^{1}: ~ 100 km (62 mi)
- Surface elevation: 1,447 m (4,747 ft)
- Frozen: Process begins in mid-October, fully frozen by November 20. Ice thickness reaches 60–120 cm (24–47 in)
- ^{1} Shore length is not a well-defined measure.

Lake Markakol (Russian: озеро Маркаколь; Kazakh: Марқакөл, romanized: Marqaköl, pronounced [mɑrqɑkɵ́l]) is a lake and popular tourist destination in East Kazakhstan. The lake is fed with small rivers and streams. Its coasts are cut up by gulfs. It is the largest lake in the Katonkaragay District of East Kazakhstan Region. Its main outflow is the Kalzhyr, a tributary of the Irtysh. There have been more than 700 species of higher plants recorded in this area.

== Etymology ==
The name of Lake Markakol consists of the Turkic words kol- “lake” and mark- "asp (fish)". The lake is also known to be nicknamed "Mark."

== History ==
The first studies on this lake and its surroundings were carried out by K.V. Struve and G.N. Potanin in 1863, after the lake's annexation by the Russian Empire. In 1976, the lake became part of the newly created Markakol Nature Reserve.

== Geography ==
The Markakol depression is bordered by the Kurchumsky and Azutau mountain ranges. It connects to the Bobrovskaya depression in the northeast, and the Zaisan valley in the southwest. The lake is longest from northeast to southwest. It has a pH of 8

Under normal weather conditions, the water in Markakol is clear blue. Although most of the lake freezes over in the winter, the area from which the Kalzhyr River flows does not.

== Fauna ==
The lake's fish include uskuch (lenok) and Thymallus. There are 258 species of birds present at Lake Markakol. Loons, grebes, ducks, gulls and waders nest in the coastal meadows. In the surrounding forests there are hazel grouse, black grouse, wood grouse and partridges.

== Climate ==
The climate is continental. During winter, snow falls and air temperatures reach −55 degrees Celsius. The average annual temperature is −4.1 degrees Celsius (lowest in Southern Altai). In summer, the temperature rises to 29 degrees Celsius.

== Gallery ==
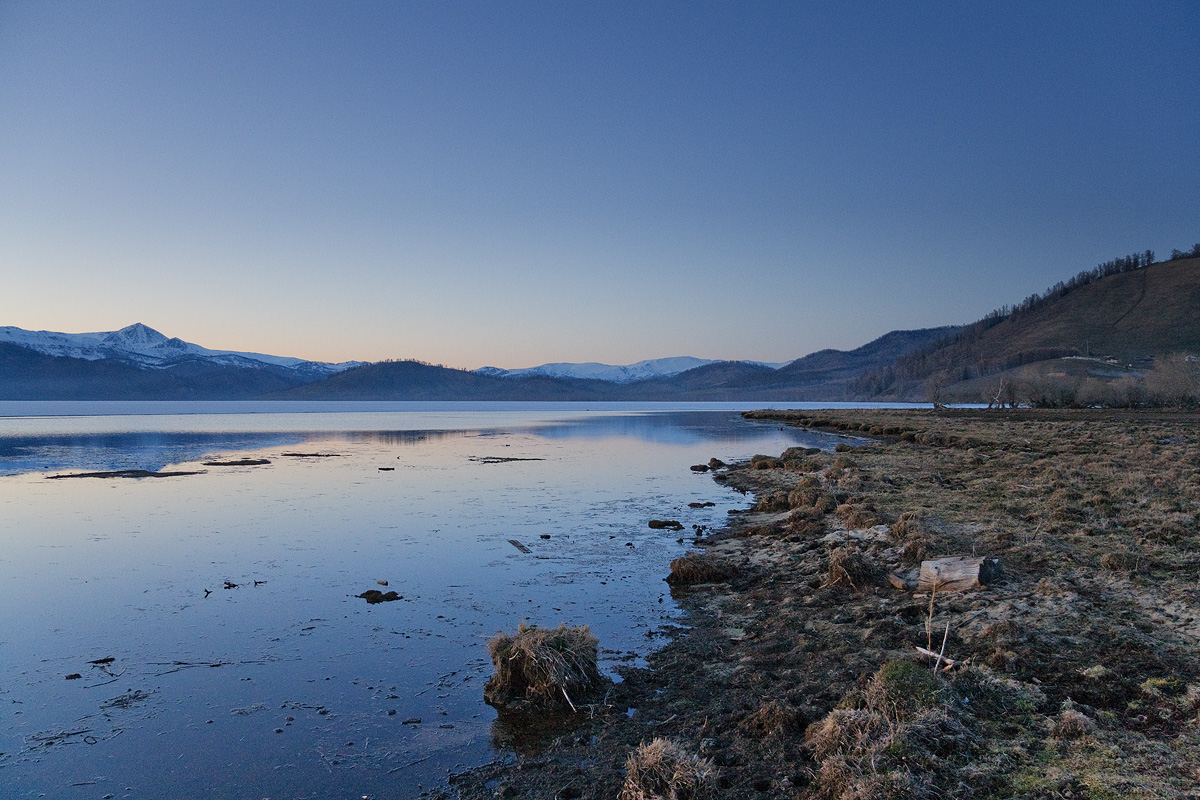

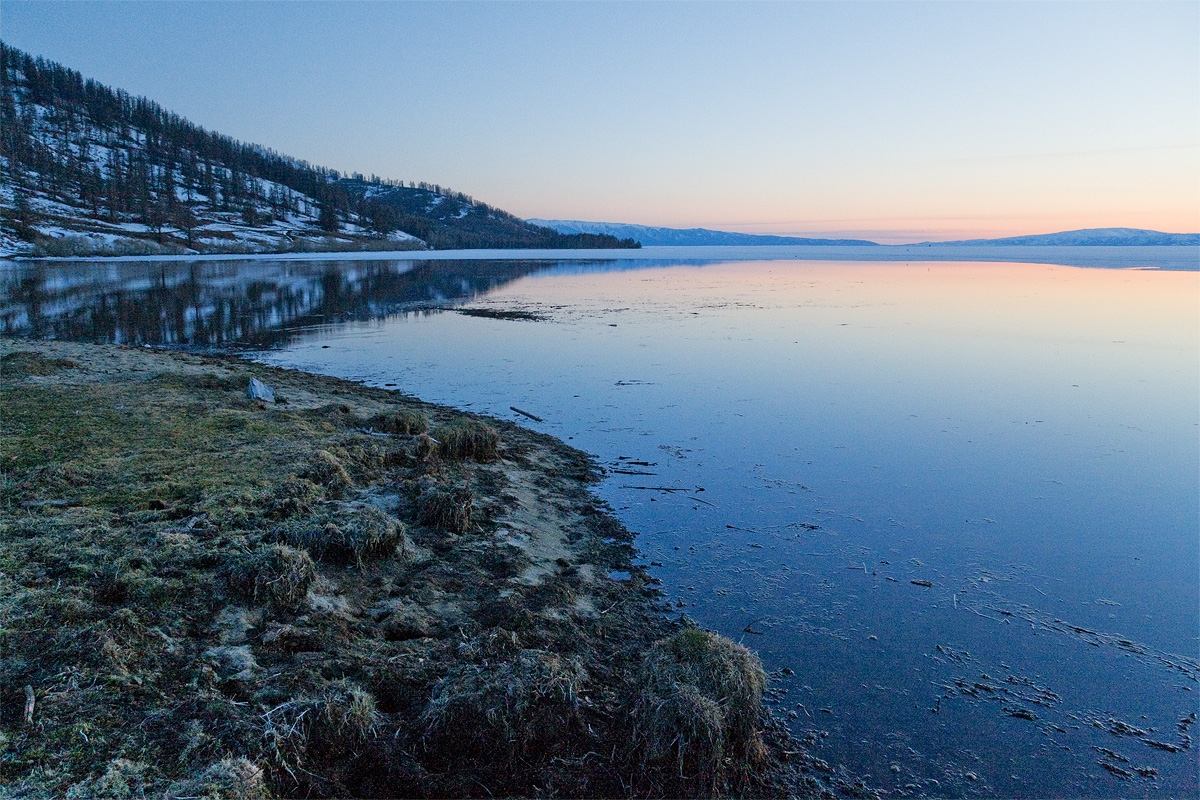

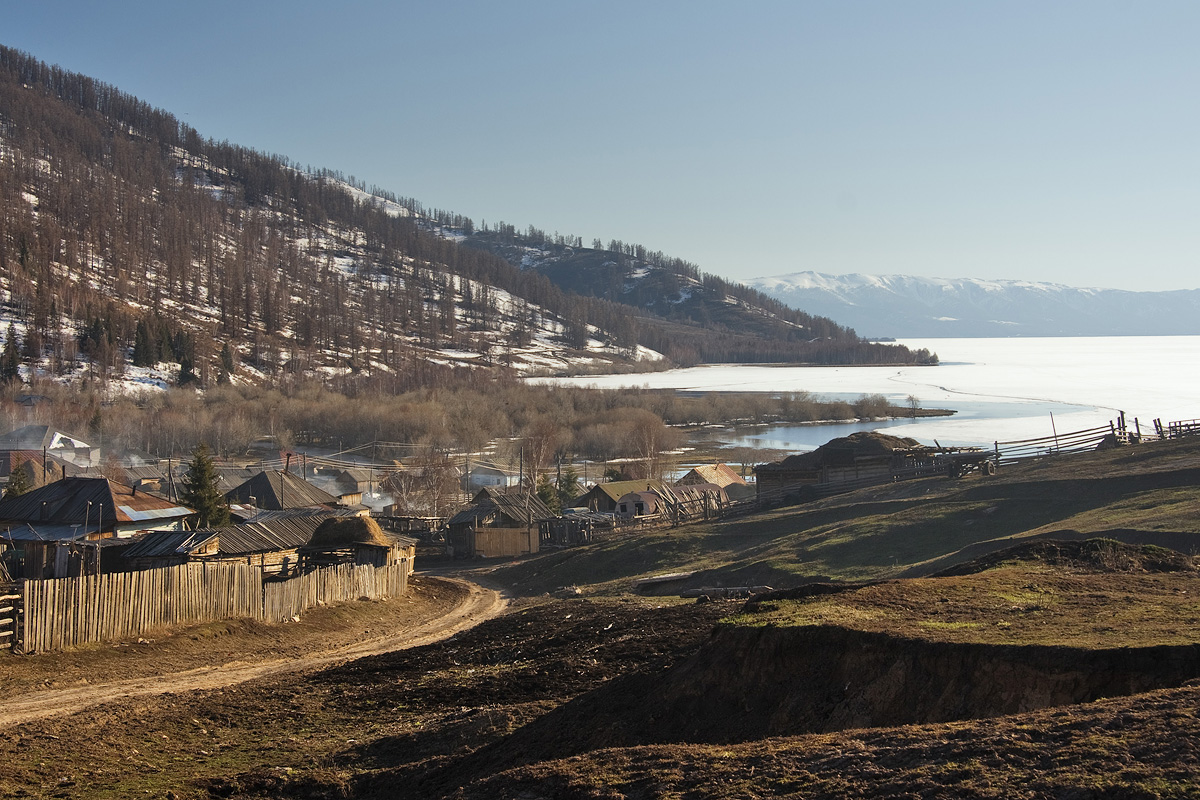
The village of Urunkhayka on the east coast of Markakol.
