= Shemonaikha District =

Coordinates: 50°37′46″N 81°54′17″E

Shemonaikha
- District
- Шемонаиха ауданы
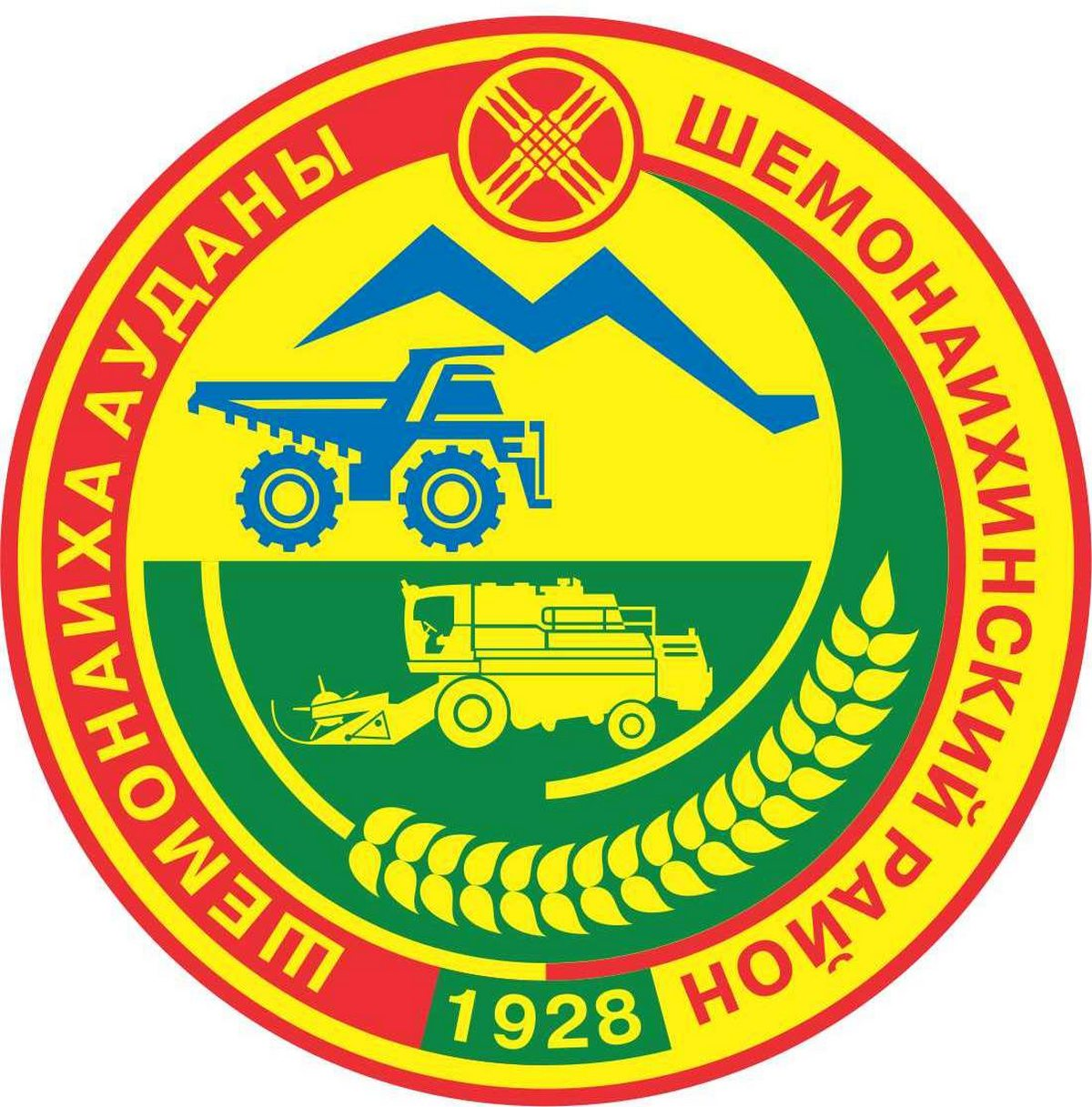
- Seal

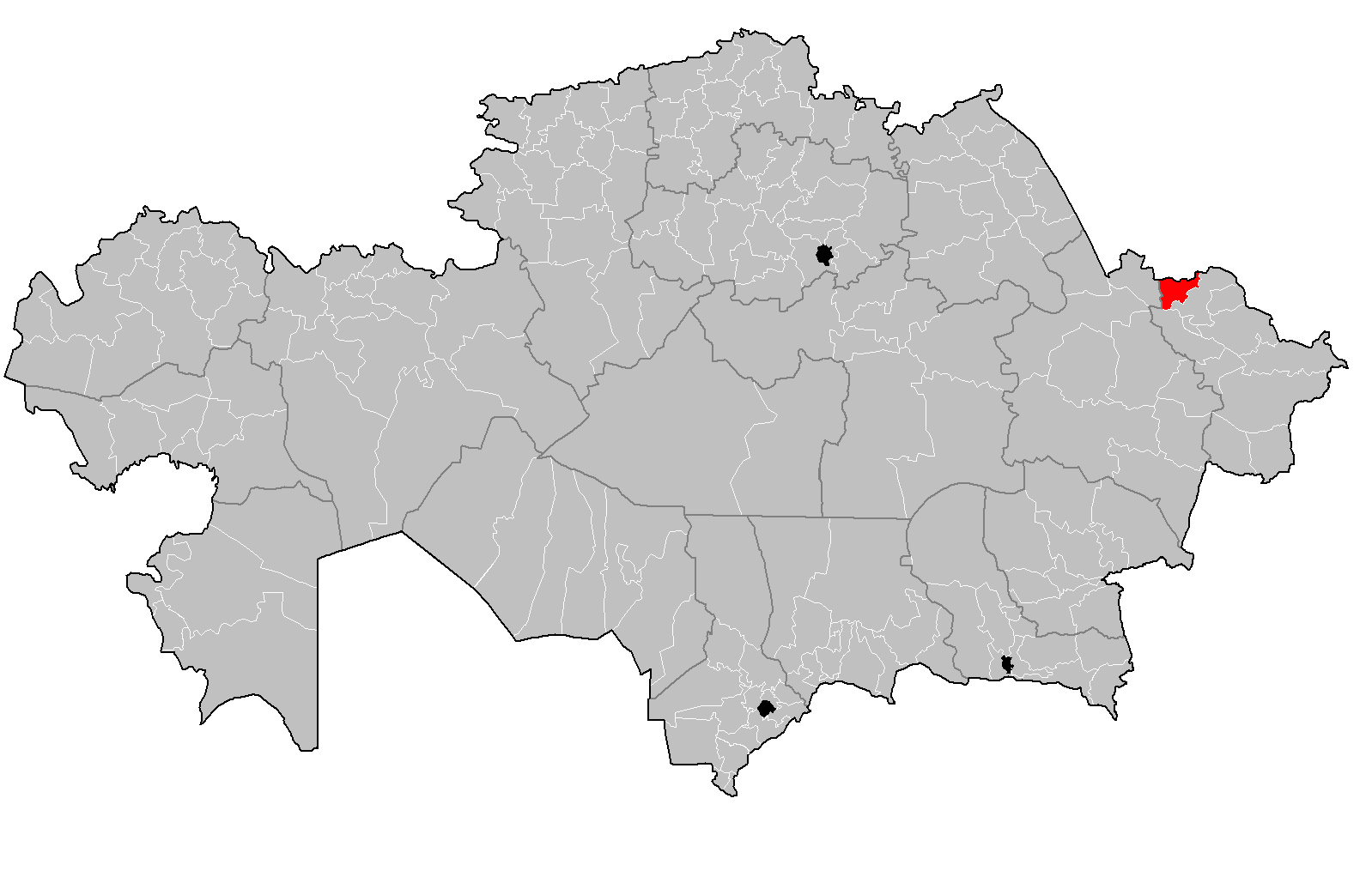
- Country: Kazakhstan
- Region: East Kazakhstan Region
- Administrative center: Shemonaikha
- Founded: 1928

Government
  - Akim: Akulov Grigory Iosifovich

Area
  - Total: 4,000 km^{2} (1,500 sq mi)

Population (2013)
  - Total: 46,409
- Time zone: UTC+5 (East)

Shemonaikha (Kazakh: Шемонаиха ауданы, Şemonaiha audany) is a district of East Kazakhstan Region in eastern Kazakhstan. The administrative center of the district is the town of Shemonaikha. Population: 46,409 (2013 estimate); 49,202 (2009 census results); 57,815 (1999 census results).

== Geography ==
Located in the north of East Kazakhstan Region. It borders in the east with Glubokovsky, in the west - with Borodulikha, in the south - with Ulansky districts of East Kazakhstan region, in the north - with Altai Territory Russian Federation.

== History ==
Shemonaikha district was formed on January 17, 1928 from Shemonaevskaya, parts of Kalininskaya, Ubinskaya volosts Semipalatinsk district and part of Krasnooktyabrskaya volost Ust-Kamenogorsk district with the center in the village of Shemonaikha. On June 11, 1959, the Pakhotny, Verkhubinsky, Vydrikhinsky and Bolsherechensky village councils of the abolished Verkh-Ubinsky district were attached to the Shemonaikha district.
