= Eternal Call (disambiguation) =

Eternal Call may refer to:

- Eternal Call, a novel by Anatoli Ivanov
- Eternal Call, a Soviet 1973—1983 epic TV series based on Ivanov's novel
- Eternal Call, a track from the Metal Massacre XI album
