= Shemonaikha =

Shemonaikha Шемонаиха
- Town
- Location in East Kazakhstan Region, Kazakhstan
- Coordinates: 50°37′36.9264″N 81°54′39.3984″E
- Country: Kazakhstan
- Region: East Kazakhstan
- District: Shemonaikha District

Population (2009)
  - Total: 19,127
- Time zone: UTC+5 (Astana Time)

Shemonaikha (Kazakh: Шемонаиха, Şemonaiha; Russian: Шемонаиха) is a town in Shemonaikha District in East Kazakhstan Region of eastern Kazakhstan. It is located on the banks of the Uba River, a right tributary of the Irtysh. Population: 19,127 (2009 census results); 19,924 (1999 census results).

== History ==
Shemonaikha was founded in 1766 as the settlement of Shemonayevskoye. The name was derived from the name of the first settler. In 1896, it was the seat of Alexandrovskaya Volost of Zmeinogorsky Uyezd, Tomsk Governorate. In 1917, Zmeinogorsky Uyezd was transferred to Altai Governorate. On June 13, 1921 the area was transferred to Semipalatinsk Governorate.

On January 17, 1928 Semipalatinsk Governorate was abolished, and Shemonaikha became the administrative center of Shemonaikha District of Semipalatinsk Okrug of the Kazak Autonomous Socialist Soviet Republic. On December 17, 1930 the okrug was abolished, and the districts were directly subordinated to the republic. On February 20, 1932 East Kazakhstan Region was established, and Shemonaikha District became a part of the region. In 1938, after completion of the railway between Rubtsovsk and Ridder, Shemonaikha was granted urban-type settlement status. In 1961, it was granted town status.

== Economy ==
=== Industry ===
Most of the industrial enterprises in Shemonaikha are related to the food industry.

=== Transportation ===
Shemonaikha has a railway station at the railway connecting Lokot (which is connected with Barnaul and Semey) and Zashchita (with further connections to Ridder, Oskemen, and Zyryanovsk). There is an infrequent passenger traffic to Barnaul, Astana, and Ridder.

The town is connected by the A10 road with Oskemen and has also road access to Semey.

== Culture and recreation ==
There is a local museum in Shemonaikha.

A monument to the two best known novels of Anatoli Ivanov was established in 2009.

== Climate ==
Shemonaikha has a humid continental climate (Köppen: Dfb) with frigid winters and warm summers.

Climate data for Shemonaikha (1991–2020)
Month	Jan	Feb	Mar	Apr	May	Jun	Jul	Aug	Sep	Oct	Nov	Dec	Year
Mean daily maximum °C (°F)	−10.6 (12.9)	−7.5 (18.5)	−0.1 (31.8)	13.0 (55.4)	21.4 (70.5)	26.3 (79.3)	27.6 (81.7)	26.3 (79.3)	19.9 (67.8)	11.5 (52.7)	−0.4 (31.3)	−7.8 (18.0)	10.0 (50.0)
Daily mean °C (°F)	−15.9 (3.4)	−13.5 (7.7)	−5.9 (21.4)	6.3 (43.3)	13.9 (57.0)	19.2 (66.6)	20.7 (69.3)	18.7 (65.7)	12.3 (54.1)	5.0 (41.0)	−5.2 (22.6)	−12.4 (9.7)	3.6 (38.5)
Mean daily minimum °C (°F)	−21.0 (−5.8)	−19.2 (−2.6)	−11.1 (12.0)	0.4 (32.7)	6.6 (43.9)	12.4 (54.3)	14.5 (58.1)	11.9 (53.4)	5.7 (42.3)	0.1 (32.2)	−9.4 (15.1)	−17.0 (1.4)	−2.2 (28.0)
Average precipitation mm (inches)	29.2 (1.15)	27.2 (1.07)	31.9 (1.26)	31.1 (1.22)	37.3 (1.47)	39.2 (1.54)	60.5 (2.38)	44.7 (1.76)	27.1 (1.07)	41.9 (1.65)	46.0 (1.81)	37.5 (1.48)	453.6 (17.86)
Average precipitation days (≥ 1.0 mm)	7.8	6.5	7.3	5.8	7.2	6.8	8.2	6.2	5.2	7.6	8.9	9.2	86.7
Source: NOAA

== People associated with Shemonaikha ==
- Birthplace of Anatoli Ivanov (writer)
- Birthplace of Ruslan Murashkin, former Russian professional football player
