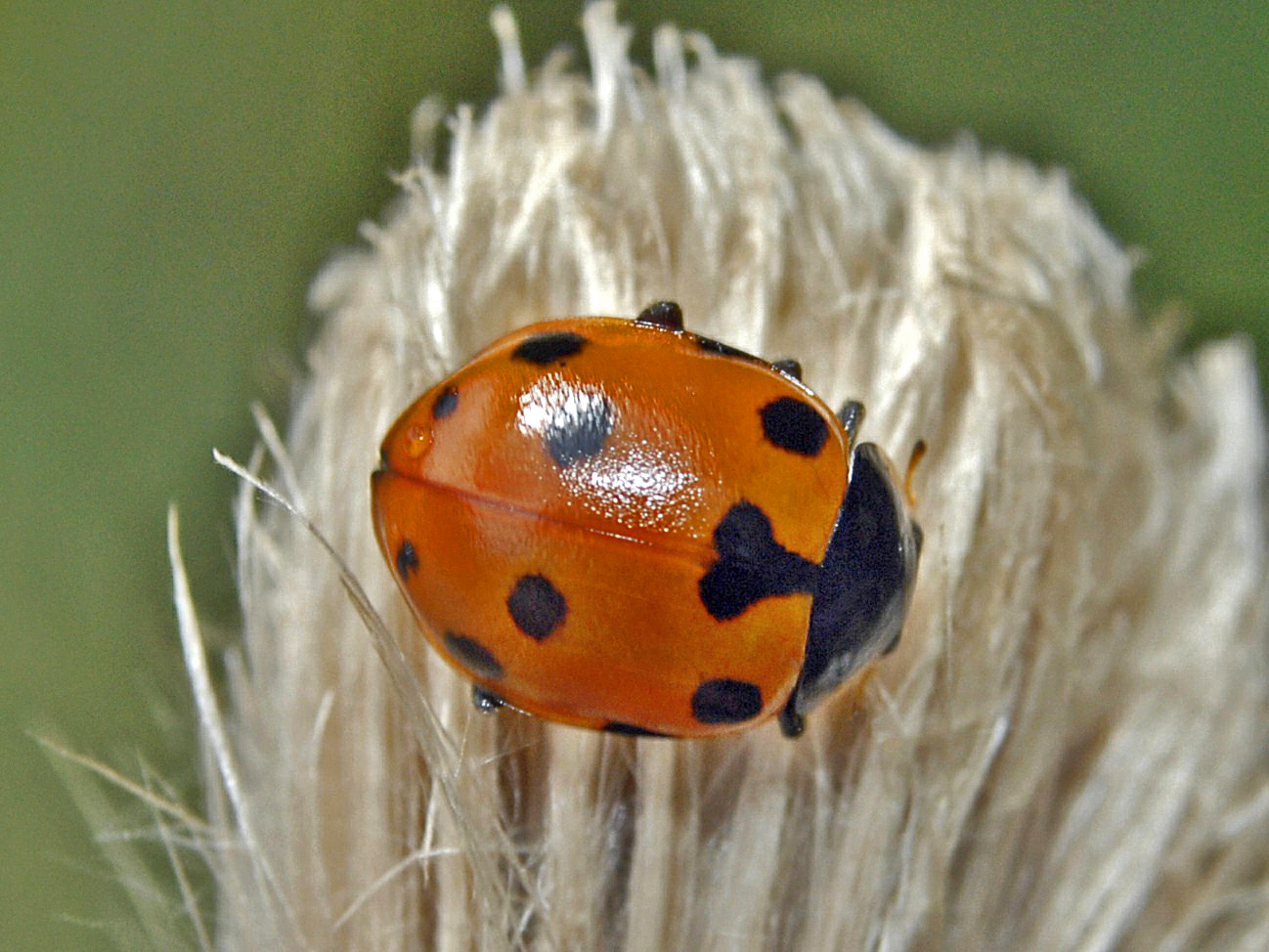

Scientific classification
- Kingdom: Animalia
- Phylum: Arthropoda
- Clade: Pancrustacea
- Class: Insecta
- Order: Coleoptera
- Suborder: Polyphaga
- Infraorder: Cucujiformia
- Family: Coccinellidae
- Genus: Ceratomegilla
- Species: C. undecimnotata

Binomial name
- Ceratomegilla undecimnotata (Schneider, 1792)

Synonyms
- Adalia undecimnotata; Ceratomegilla undecimnotata (Schneider, 1792); Coccinella undecimnotata Schneider, 1792; Hippodamia undecimnotata Schneider, 1792; Semiadalia undecimnotata Schneider

= Ceratomegilla undecimnotata =

Species of beetle

Ceratomegilla undecimnotata is a species of black-spotted lady beetle belonging to the family Coccinellidae, subfamily Coccinellinae.

== Description ==
Ceratomegilla undecimnotata can reach a length of about 5–7 millimetres (0.20–0.28 in). Body is elongated. Elytra are orange-red, while pronotum is black, sometimes with a small white line at the front edge. Elytra show a central black spot and 10 lateral black spots. There are a total of eleven spots (hence the Latin species name undecimnotata), but some spots sometimes are small and barely visible.

This species can be confused with Coccinella septempunctata, but it is smaller and more oval, the central spot above the pronotum is more triangular than round and there is no white around it.

Adults can be encountered from March through October. They mainly feed on aphids.

== Distribution ==
This quite rare species can be found in central and southern Europe.

== Habitat ==
It occurs in open, sunny environments (sunny forest edges, meadows, herbaceous, and dry grasslands, etc.).

== Bibliography ==
- Dimitrios P. Papachristos - Adverse effects of soil applied insecticides on the predatory coccinellid Hippodamia undecimnotata (Coleoptera: Coccinellidae)
- Dimitrios C. Kontodimas - Phenology of Hippodamia undecimnotata (Col.: Coccinellidae) in Greece
- Panayotis KATSOYANNOS, Dimitris C. KONTODIMAS, George STATHAS Summer diapause and winter quiescence of Hippodamia (Semiadalia) undecimnotata (Coleoptera: Coccinellidae) in central Greece
