= Uba (river) =

River in Kazakhstan

Übi, Uba
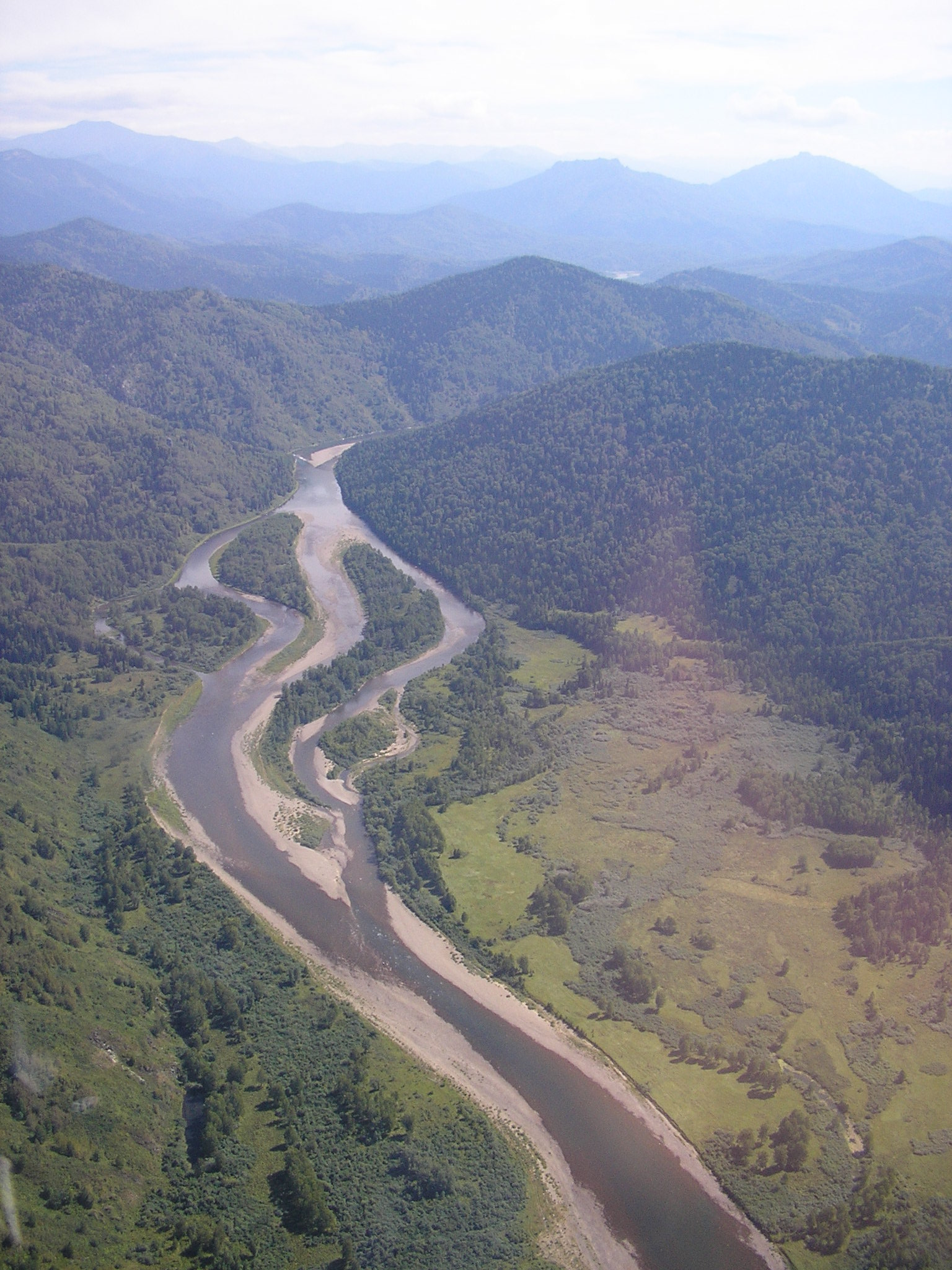
- Native name: Übi (Kazakh)

Physical characteristics
- Mouth: Ertis
  - coordinates: 50°16′58″N 81°41′47″E
- Length: 278 km (173 mi)
- Basin size: 9,850 km^{2} (3,800 sq mi)

Basin features
- Progression: Irtysh→ Ob→ Kara Sea

The Übi (Kazakh: Үбі, Übi) or Uba (Russian: Уба) is a river of Kazakhstan. The river is a 278 km tributary stream to the transboundary Ertis river, and has a surrounding drainage basin that is 9,850 km^{2} in size. It flows through the town Shemonaikha.
