= Ruslan Murashkin =

Russian footballer

Personal information
- Full name: Ruslan Vladimirovich Murashkin
- Date of birth: 30 April 1989 (age 37)
- Place of birth: Shemonaikha, Kazakh SSR
- Height: 1.85 m (6 ft 1 in)
- Position: Midfielder

Youth career
- DYuSSh Kasimov

Senior career*
| Years | Team | Apps | (Gls) |
| 2004–2006 | FC Kasimov | | |
| 2007 | FC Spartak-MZhK Ryazan | 7 | (0) |
| 2008–2009 | FC Energiya Shatura | | |
| 2010 | FC Zvezda Ryazan | 15 | (0) |
| 2011 | FC Sasovo | | |
| 2012–2014 | FC Germes Chuchkovo | | |
- * Club domestic league appearances and goals

Ruslan Vladimirovich Murashkin (Russian: Руслан Владимирович Мурашкин; born 30 April 1989) is a former Russian professional football player.

== Club career ==
He played in the Russian Football National League for FC Spartak-MZhK Ryazan in 2007.
