= Katun Nature Reserve =

Strict nature reserve in the Altai Republic, Russia

- Russian: Катунский заповедник (Also: Katunsky)
- IUCN category Ia (strict nature reserve)
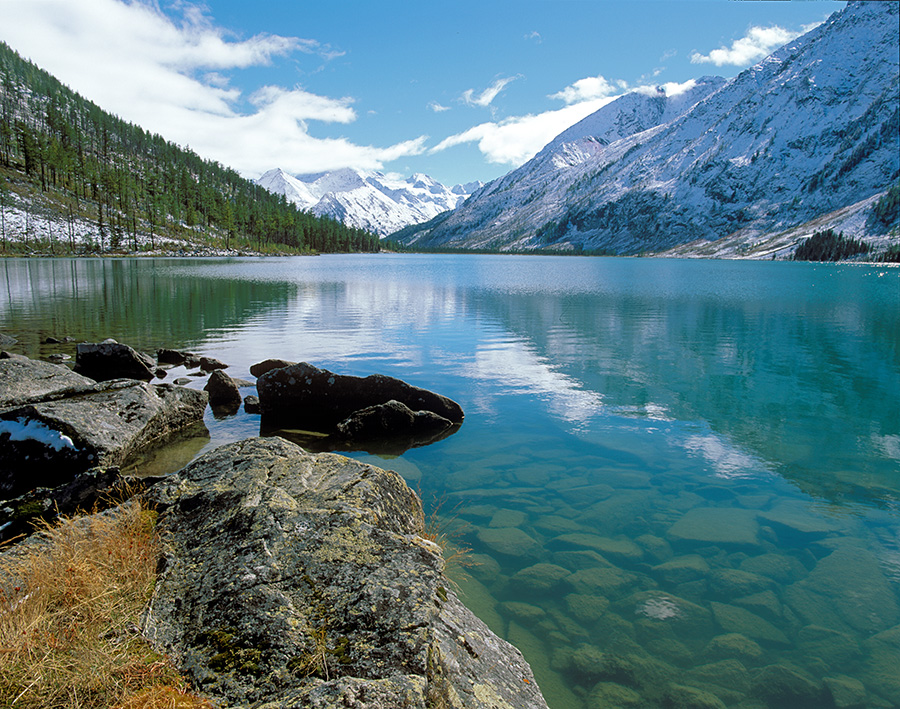
- Katun Zapovednik

- Location within Russia
- Location: Altai Republic
- Nearest city: Gorno-Altaysk
- Coordinates: 49°38′0″N 86°6′0″E
- Area: 150,079 hectares (370,853 acres; 579 sq mi)
- Established: 1991
- Governing body: Ministry of Natural Resources and Environment (Russia)
- Website: http://www.katunskiy.ru/

Katun Nature Reserve (Russian: Катунский заповедник) (also Katunsky) is a Russian zapovednik (strict nature reserve) located in the highlands of the central Altai Mountains of south Siberia. The Katun River runs down through a valley in the reserve, serving as the primary source of the Ob River. The headwaters of the Katun River originate on Mount Belukha, the highest mountain in Siberia at 4,506 metres (14,783 ft), which is located on the far eastern edge of the preserve. Katun is an internationally important center of biodiversity, forming part of the "Golden Mountains of Altai" UNESCO World Heritage Site. Katun Nature Reserve is situated in the Ust-Koksinsky District of Altai Republic.

== Topography ==
The topography of the reserve includes glaciers, alpine tundra, meadows, and forests. Much of the terrain has been formed through glaciation, and there are small lakes, streams, waterfalls, and steep slopes.

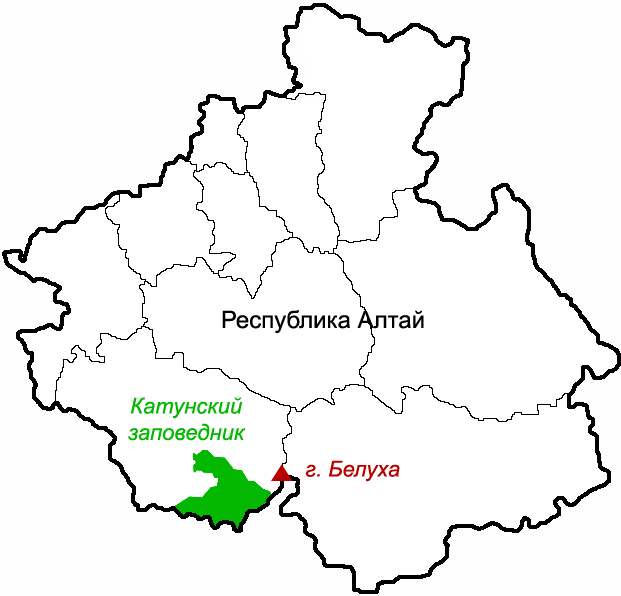
Location of Katun Nature Reserve in southwest of Altai Republic

== Ecoregion and climate ==
Katun is located in the Altai alpine meadow and tundra ecoregion (WWF ID #PA1001). This ecoregion displays a complete sequence of altitudinal vegetation zones in central Siberia including steppe, forest-steppe, mixed forest, sub-alpine vegetation and alpine vegetation. The region is also an important habitat for endangered the snow leopard and its prey.

The Katun Reserve has an Alpine climate (Köppen climate classification (ET)). This indicates a local climate in which at least one month has an average temperature high enough to melt snow (0 °C (32 °F)), but no month with an average temperature in excess of 10 °C (50 °F).

== Flora and fauna ==
The reserve features 700 species of plants, 51 mammals, 140 of birds, three types of reptiles and eight fish species. Endangered species include the fawn lily (Erythronium sibericum), peony (Paeonia hybrida), spleenwort (Asplenium exiguum), and, rarely, the snow leopard (Uncia uncia).

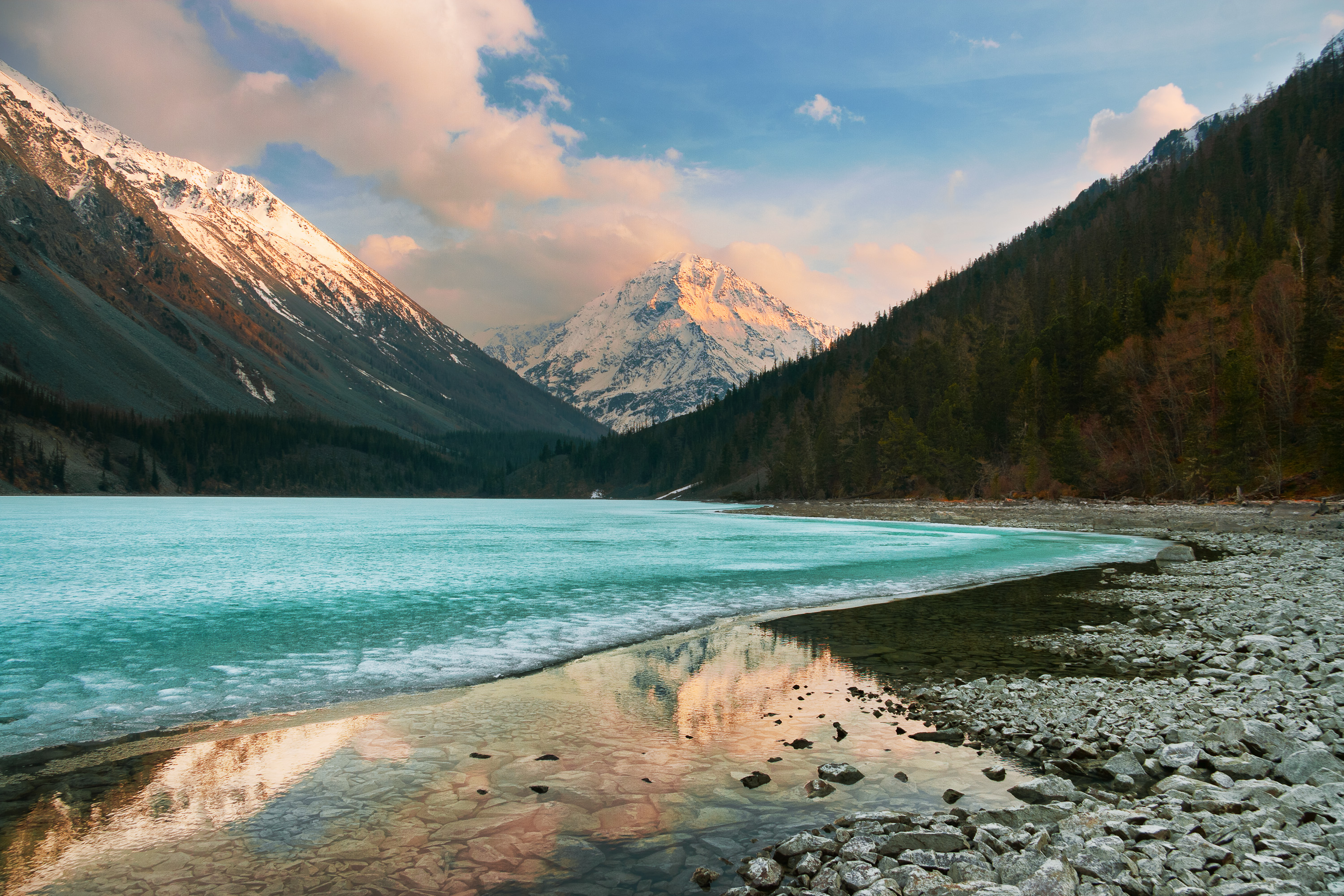
Sunset at Kucherla Lake

== Ecotourism ==
As a strict nature reserve, the Katun Reserve is mostly closed to the general public, although scientists and those with "environmental education" purposes can make arrangements with park management for visits. There are "ecotourist" routes in the reserve, however, that are open to the public, but require permits to be obtained in advance. The main office is in the town of Ust'-Koksa. Reserve rangers lead ecotourist hikes to Upper Lake Multinskiye, with groups assembling at 11:00 daily in season (July–September). There are other ecoroutes, requiring guides, to the headwaters of the Katun River.

== See also ==
- List of Russian Nature Reserves (class 1a "zapovedniks")
