= Altai alpine meadow and tundra =

Ecoregion in the Altai Mountains

Coordinates: 48.75°N 88.25°E

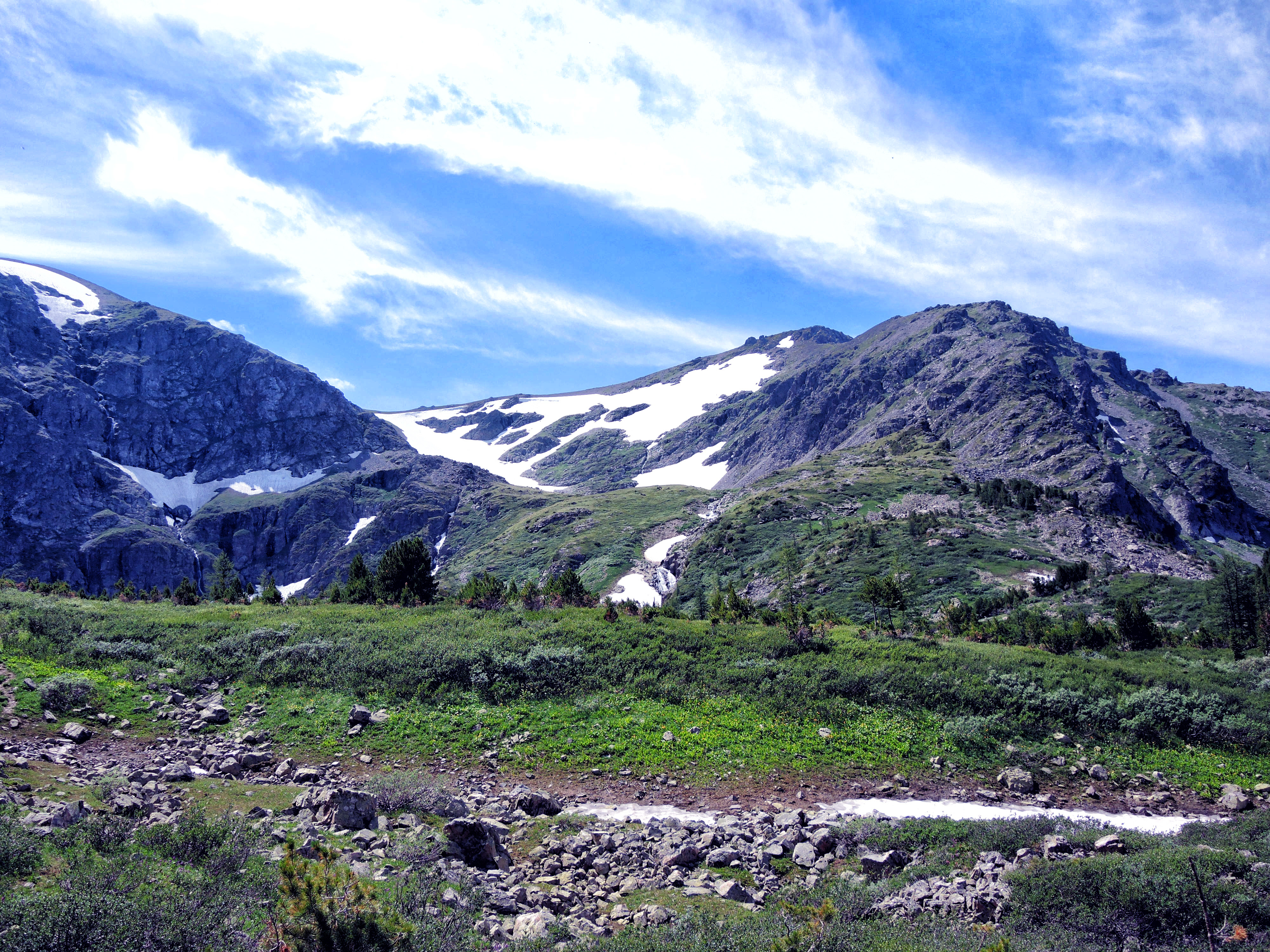
- Katun Nature Reserve, in the Altai Republic, Russia

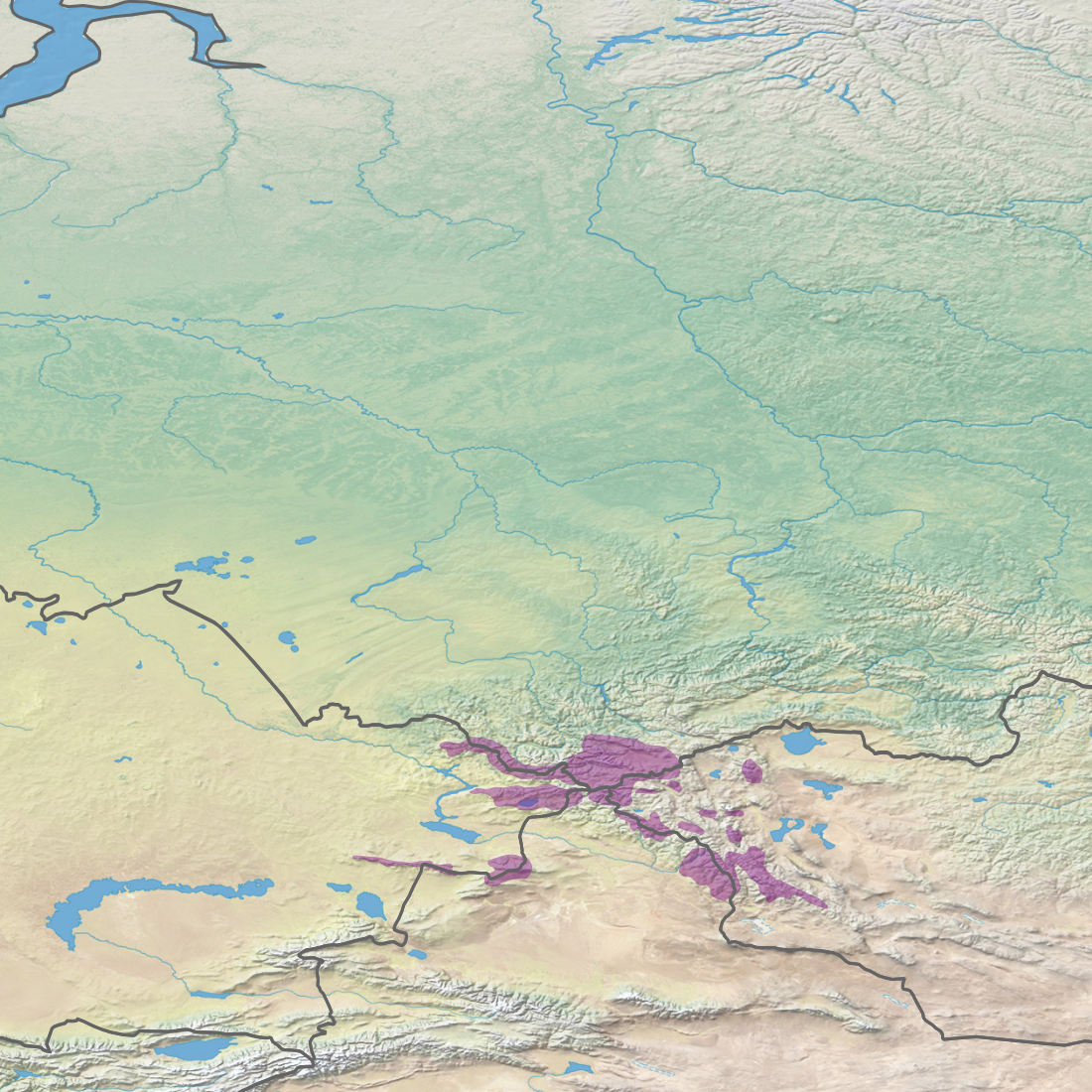
- Altai Alpine Meadow and Tundra in purple

Ecology
- Realm: Palearctic
- Biome: montane grasslands and shrublands

Geography
- Area: 90,132 km^{2} (34,800 sq mi)
- Countries: Russia; Kazakhstan; China; Mongolia

The Altai alpine meadow and tundra ecoregion (WWF ID: PA1001) is a terrestrial ecoregion covering the higher elevation of the Altai Mountains at the center of the "X" formed by the borders separating Russia, Kazakhstan, China, and Mongolia. The mountain peaks are the farthest north in Central Asia, separating the plains of Siberia to the north from the hot, dry deserts to the south. Altitudes above 2,400 meters display characteristics of tundra, with patches of alpine meadows and some trees immediately below the treeline. The ecoregion is in the montane grasslands and shrublands biome, and the Palearctic realm, with a humid continental climate. It covers an area of 90,132 square kilometres (34,800 sq mi).

== Location and description ==
The ecoregion covers the high-peak ranges of mountains across the meeting of Russia, Kazakhstan, China and Mongolia, stretching about 700 km from northwest-to-southeast, and a similar distance from southwest-to-northeast. The ecoregion is scattered, capturing the higher elevations above the treeline; the lower elevations in this area are mostly in the Altai montane forest and forest steppe ecoregion, with warmer temperatures. The Altai are broken into a number of ranges, with the Southern Altai in Kazakhstan, and the Mongolian Altai and Gobi Altai stretching away to the southeast.

Because these mountains are at a relatively high latitude compared to other Central Asian mountains, the alpine regions begin at lower altitudes. The treeline at its highest is 2,400 metres (7,900 ft), and the zone of rocks and glaciers at 3,000 metres (9,800 ft).

== Climate ==
The region has a Tundra (Koppen classification ET). This climate is defined as having at least one month warm enough to melt snow (average greater than 0 degrees C), but no month averaging over 10 °C (50 °F). The high Altai region receives mean precipitation of about 294 mm/year. The mean temperature is −26 °C (−15 °F) in January, and 9.4 °C (48.9 °F) in July.

Altai Region (48.5 N, 88.5 E)

Climate chart (precipitation, max. and min. temperature)
J	F	M	A	M	J	J	A	S	O	N	D
5.8 −20 −32	6.5 −18 −32	12 −12 −25	22 1 −12	36 9 −5	43 15 0	56 17 2	43 16 0	25 10 −5	19 1 −12	16 −10 −22	10 −17 −29
- █ Average max. and min. temperatures in °C
- █ Precipitation totals in mm
- Source: globalspecies.org
Imperial conversion
J	F	M	A	M	J	J	A	S	O	N	D
0.2 −3 −26	0.3 −1 −26	0.5 11 −13	0.9 34 11	1.4 49 24	1.7 58 32	2.2 62 36	1.7 60 33	1 50 24	0.7 34 11	0.6 15 −7	0.4 2 −20
- █ Average max. and min. temperatures in °F
- █ Precipitation totals in inches

== Flora and fauna ==
Overall, the plant life of the Altai show more closeness to Arctic species than do the more southerly mountains of Central Asia (the Tian Shan, the Himalayas, and Tibetan). One study of 300 species in the region found that 39% had Arctic affinities. Within the region, plant life is highly dependent on altitude zonation and the elevation levels. There are few species in the highest, "nival" zone, where glaciers and exposed bare rock make life difficult. The sub-nival (high-alpine) zone features moss, lichen, and creeping plants over broad areas of the high plateaus. The low-alpine zone, above full treeline, is a zone of alpine meadows featuring dwarf birch (Betula rotundifolia) in the wetter northern areas, and sedge-meadows of Kobresia (bog sedge) and Carex.

Because of its remoteness, the mountains of this ecoregion support many vulnerable species of mammals, including significant populations of the endangered Snow leopard (Panthera uncia), the Eurasian lynx (Lynx lynx), and the vulnerable Siberian musk deer (Moschus moschiferus).

== Protections ==
There are a number of nationally protected areas that are at least partially in the ecoregion:

- Katun Nature Reserve, follows the Katun Ridge of the Altai Mountains, mostly in Russia along the border with Kazakhstan.
- Katon-Karagay National Park, includes a portion of Belukha Mountain, shared with Russia and reaching an altitude of 4,506 meters.
- Altai Tavan Bogd National Park, south of Tavan Bogd, at 4,374 meters the highest mountain in Mongolia.

== See also ==
- List of ecoregions in Russia
- List of ecoregions in Mongolia
- List of ecoregions in China
- List of ecoregions in Kazakhstan
