= Anatoli Ivanov (writer) =

Soviet writer (1928–1999)

- Анатолий Иванов
- Born: 5 May 1928; Shemonaikha, Kazakh ASSR, Soviet Union
- Died: 31 May 1999 (aged 71); Moscow, Russia
- Resting place: Novodevichy Cemetery
- Education: Kazakh State University
- Occupation: Writer
- Writing career
- Genres: Novel, Novella, Prose
- Notable awards: Hero of Socialist Labour; USSR State Prize; RSFSR State Prize; Lenin Komsomol Prize; Order of Lenin; Order of the October Revolution; Order of the Red Banner
- Literary movement: Socialist realism

Anatoli Stepanovich Ivanov (Russian: Анато́лий Степа́нович Ивано́в; 5 May 1928 – 31 May 1999) was a Soviet and Russian writer known for his novels on rural topics.

Ivanov was born on in the village of Shemonaikha (now in the East Kazakhstan Region of Kazakhstan). His parents, Marfa Loginovna and Stepan Ivanov, came from peasant farming families, but he was not involved in the farm, living in the district center where his father worked as head of the district department of Soyuzpechat. In 1946-1950 he studied at the journalism faculty of Kazakh State University. His creative activity began in 1948 as a journalist in the newspaper Priirtyshskaya pravda (Semipalatinsk), served in the military, then was the editor of the regional newspaper Leninskoe znamya in the Novosibirsk Oblast. From 1954 he began to publish stories; his first collection was Alkiny pesni (Alka's songs, 1958). In 1958-1964 he was deputy editor of the magazine Sibirskie ogni. In the late 1960s he moved to Moscow. The main themes of his works are the revolution in the Siberian villages, collectivization, and World War II.

Two of his novels were filmed. Eternal Call was the base of the TV series with the same name. Another TV series was based on his novel Shadows Disappear at Noon (ru:Тени исчезают в полдень). The two novels are represented in a monument at the author's birthplace Shemonaikha. Ivanov was a Hero of Socialist Labour and recipient of many other awards.

He died on 31 May 1999, and was buried in Moscow at the Novodevichy Cemetery.
