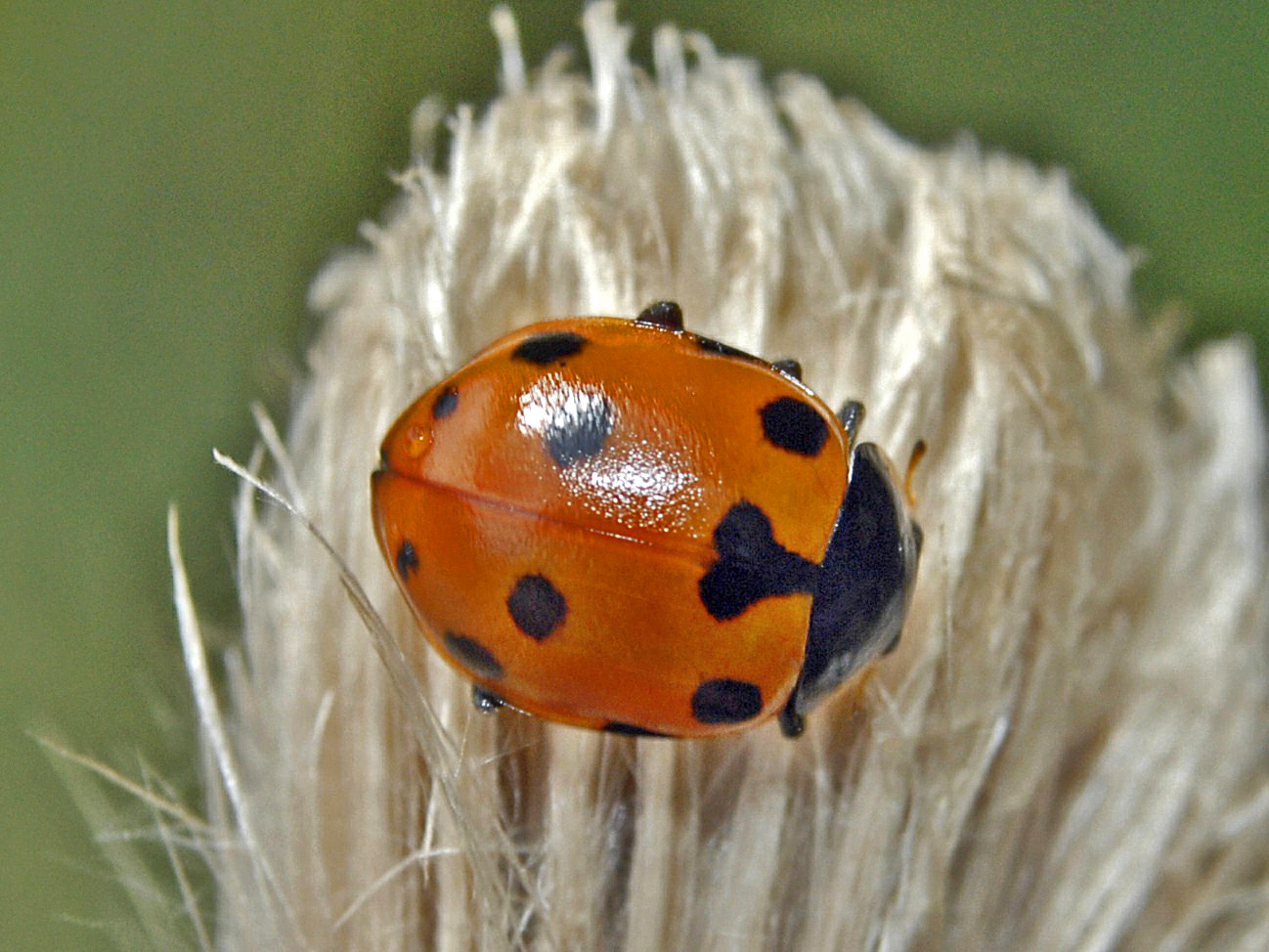
- Ceratomegilla undecimnotata

Scientific classification
- Kingdom: Animalia
- Phylum: Arthropoda
- Clade: Pancrustacea
- Class: Insecta
- Order: Coleoptera
- Suborder: Polyphaga
- Infraorder: Cucujiformia
- Family: Coccinellidae
- Tribe: Coccinellini
- Genus: Ceratomegilla; Crotch, 1873

Synonyms
- Adaliopsis Capra, 1926; Asemiadalia Barovsky, 1931; Semiadalia Crotch, 1874; Spiladelpha Semenov & Dobzhansky, 1922

= Ceratomegilla =

Genus of beetles

Ceratomegilla is a genus of lady beetles in the family Coccinellidae. There are about eight described species in Ceratomegilla.

== Species ==
These species belong to the genus Ceratomegilla:

- Ceratomegilla alpina (A.Villa & G.B.Villa, 1835)
- Ceratomegilla apicalis (Weise, 1879)
- Ceratomegilla decimguttata (Jing, 1986)
- Ceratomegilla notata (Laicharting, 1781)
- Ceratomegilla potanini (Weise, 1889)
- Ceratomegilla rickmersi (Weise, 1901)
- Ceratomegilla rufocincta (Mulsant, 1850)
- Ceratomegilla schneideri (Weise, 1879)
- Ceratomegilla schelkovnikovi (Dobzhansky, 1927)
- Ceratomegilla ulkei Crotch, 1873
- Ceratomegilla undecimnotata (Schneider, 1792)
- Ceratomegilla weisei (Frivaldszky, 1892)

== Selected former species ==
- Ceratomegilla heydeni (Weise, 1892)
