= Glubokoye District =

Coordinates: 50°08′45″N 82°18′25″E

Glubokoe
- District
- Глубокое ауданы Глубоковский район
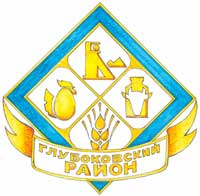
- Coat of arms

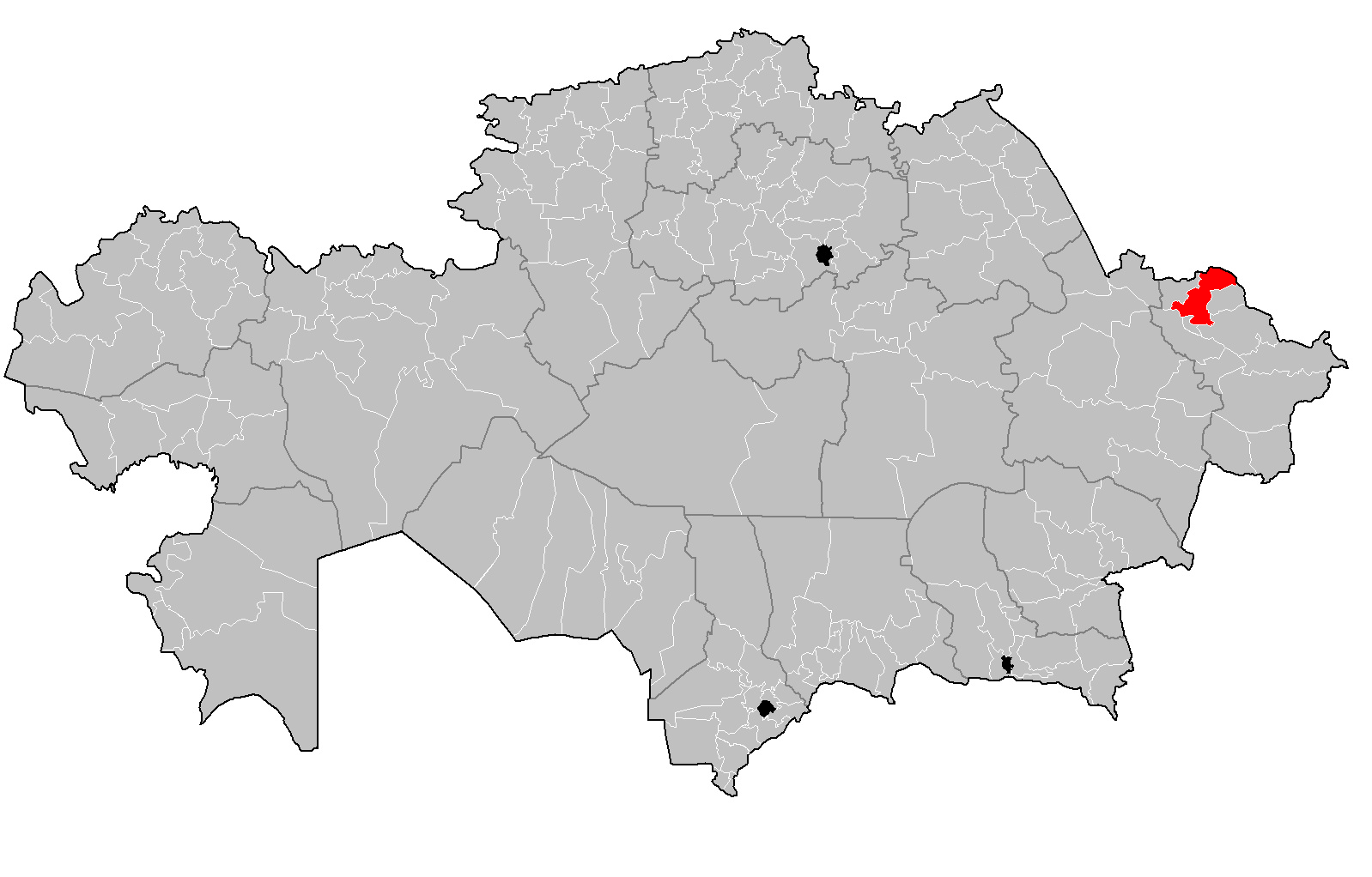
- Country: Kazakhstan
- Region: East Kazakhstan Region
- Administrative center: Glubokoye (Chinese: 格卢博科耶)
- Founded: 1964

Government
  - Akim: Eldar Tumashinov

Area
  - Total: 2,800 sq mi (7,300 km^{2})

Population (2013)
  - Total: 63,890
- Time zone: UTC+6 (East)

Glubokoe (Kazakh: Глубокое ауданы, Glubokoe audany, Russian: Глубоковский район) is a district of East Kazakhstan Region in eastern Kazakhstan. The administrative center of the district is the settlement of Glubokoye. Population: 63,890 (2013 estimate); 63,581 (2009 census results); 67,329 (1999 census results).
