= Altai District =

Coordinates: 49°43′52″N 84°15′40″E

Altai Алтай ауданы / Район Алтай
- District
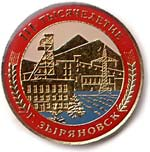
- Coat of arms

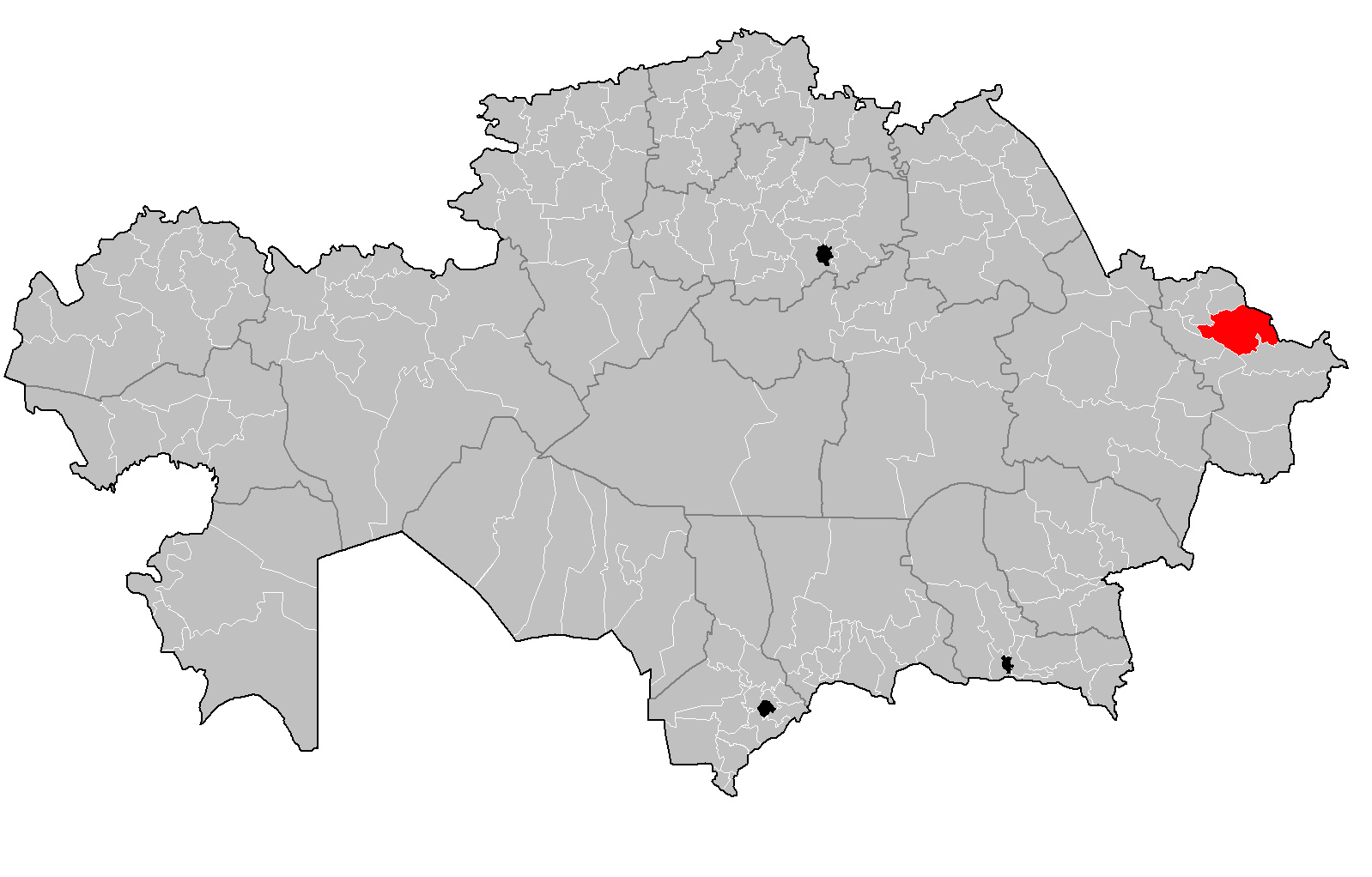

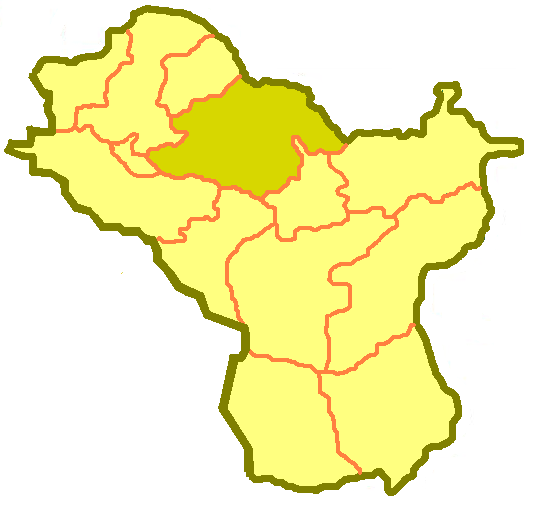
- Country: Kazakhstan
- Region: East Kazakhstan Region
- Administrative center: Zyryanovsk
- Founded: 1977

Area
  - Total: 4,100 sq mi (10,500 km^{2})

Population (2013)
  - Total: 35,281
- Time zone: UTC+6 (East)

Altai (Kazakh: Алтай ауданы, romanized: Altai audany; Russian: Район Алтай, romanized: Raion Altai), until 2019 known as Zyryan (Kazakh: Зырян ауданы, Zyrian audany) or Zyryanovsk (Russian: Зыряновский район) is a district of East Kazakhstan Region in eastern Kazakhstan. The administrative center of the district is the town of Zyryanovsk. Population: 35,281 (2013 estimate); 38,352 (2009 census results); 49,833 (1999 census results).
