= Altai, Kazakhstan =

Altai Алтай
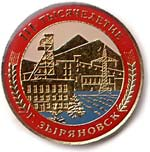
- Seal

- Location in Kazakhstan
- Coordinates: 49°44′19″N 84°16′19″E
- Country: Kazakhstan
- Region: East Kazakhstan Region
- District: Zyryan District
- Founded: 1791
- Incorporated (city): 1941

Government
  - Akim (mayor): Larisa Grechushnikova

Population (2009)
  - Total: 39,320
- Time zone: UTC+6 (ALMT)
- Postal code: F42****
- Area code: +7 72335

Altai (Kazakh: Алтай, Russian: Алтай), until 2019 known as Zyryan (Kazakh: Зырян, romanized: Zyrian) or Zyryanovsk (Russian: Зыряновск) is a town of regional significance in East Kazakhstan Region of Kazakhstan, and the administrative center of the Altai District. It was established in 1791 and was granted town status in 1941. Population: 39,320 (2009 census results);43,894 (1999 census results).

== Location ==
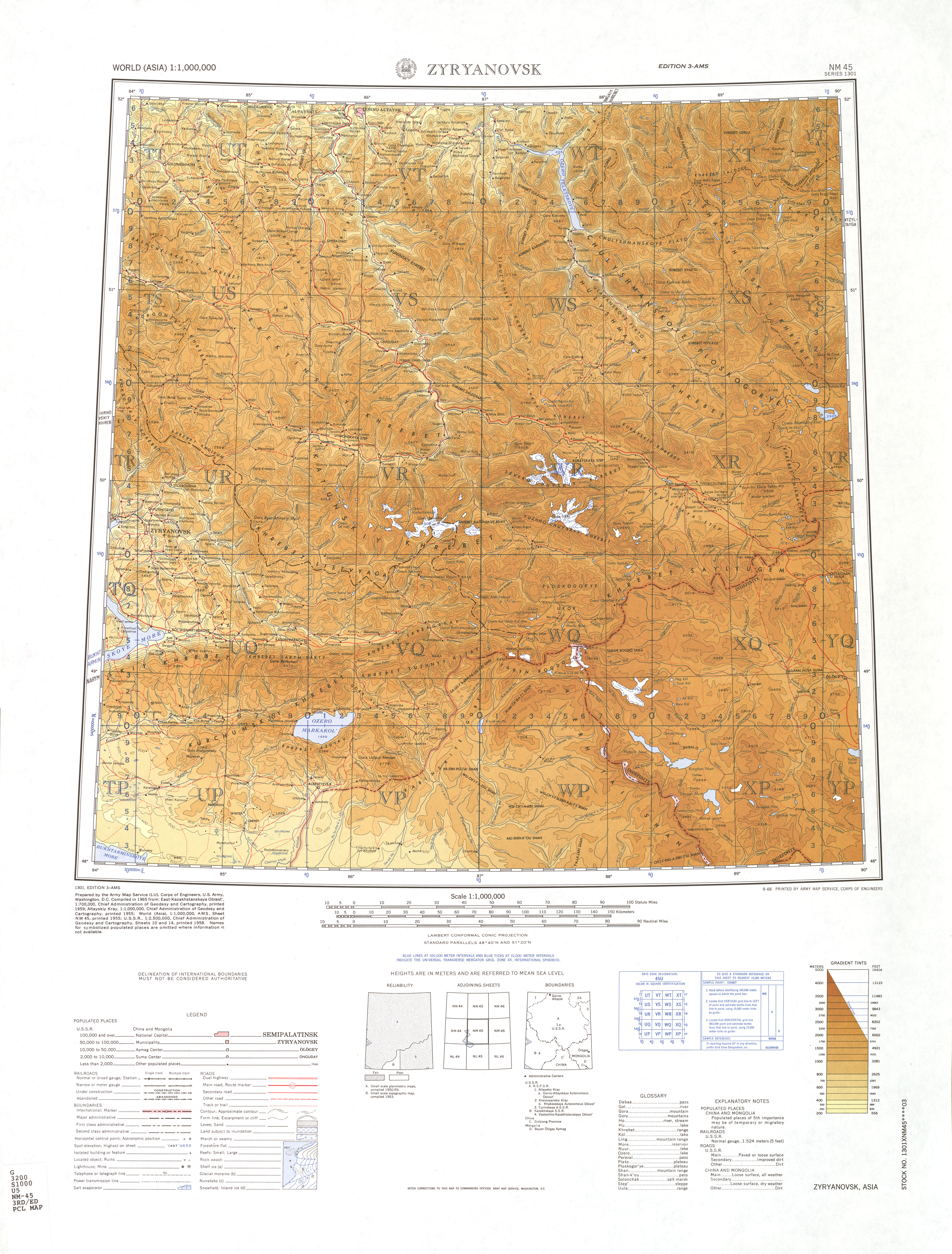
Map of Altai Town (labeled as ZYRYANOVSK) and surrounding region from the International Map of the World (1965)

Zyryanovsk is located in the Rudnyi Altai, on the banks of the Berezovka River, a left tributary of the Bukhtarma. A 183-km railroad connects Zyrianovsk with Ust-Kamenogorsk. Also through Zyryanovsk there passes a highways Ust-Kamenogorsk – Rakhmanovskie Kluchi and Ust-Kamenogorsk – Bolshenarymskoe.

== Industry ==
Zyrianovsk owed its establishment to the exploitation of a complex ore deposit, discovered in 1791 by a local inhabitant, G. G. Zyrianov. Zyrianovsk has a lead combination (division "Kazzinc"). The combine is educated from two mines (Maleevsky and Grekhovsky), concentrating factory, and non-productive departments.

== Education ==
In the center of the East Kazakhstan State Technical University, medical college, agrarian and technical college, humanitarian college, construction and transport college, and industrial college functions. There are 8 schools, 3 kindergartens, 3 public libraries, a Palace of Culture, equipment and sports, the Equipments-House.

== Notable residents ==
- Alfred Koch (born 1961), Russian writer, mathematician-economist, and businessman
- Alexander Rosenbaum (born 1951), Soviet and Russian bard
