= East Kazakhstan Region =

Region in eastern Kazakhstan

East Kazakhstan Region Шығыс Қазақстан облысы (Kazakh) Восточно-Казахстанская область (Russian)
- Region
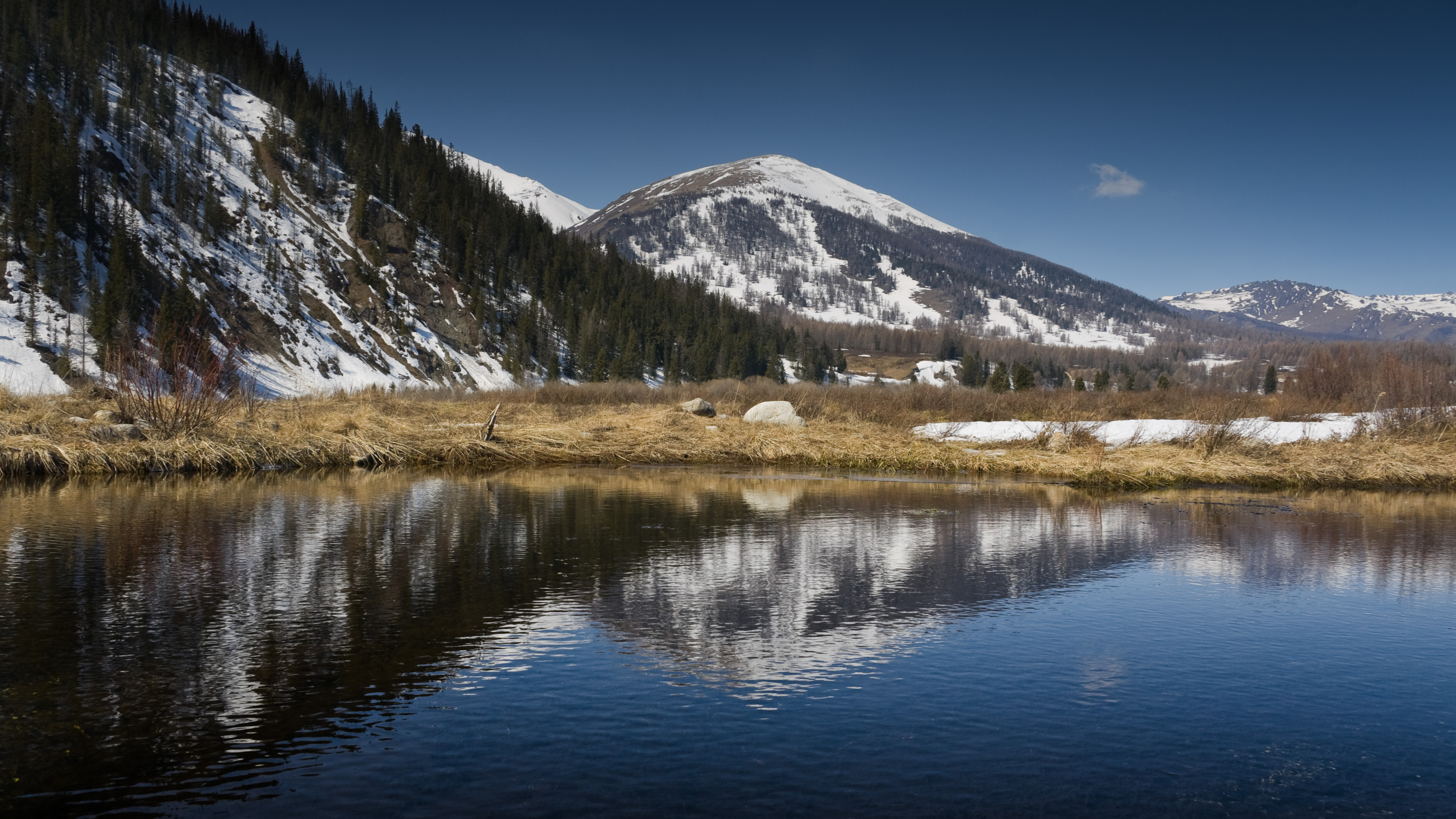
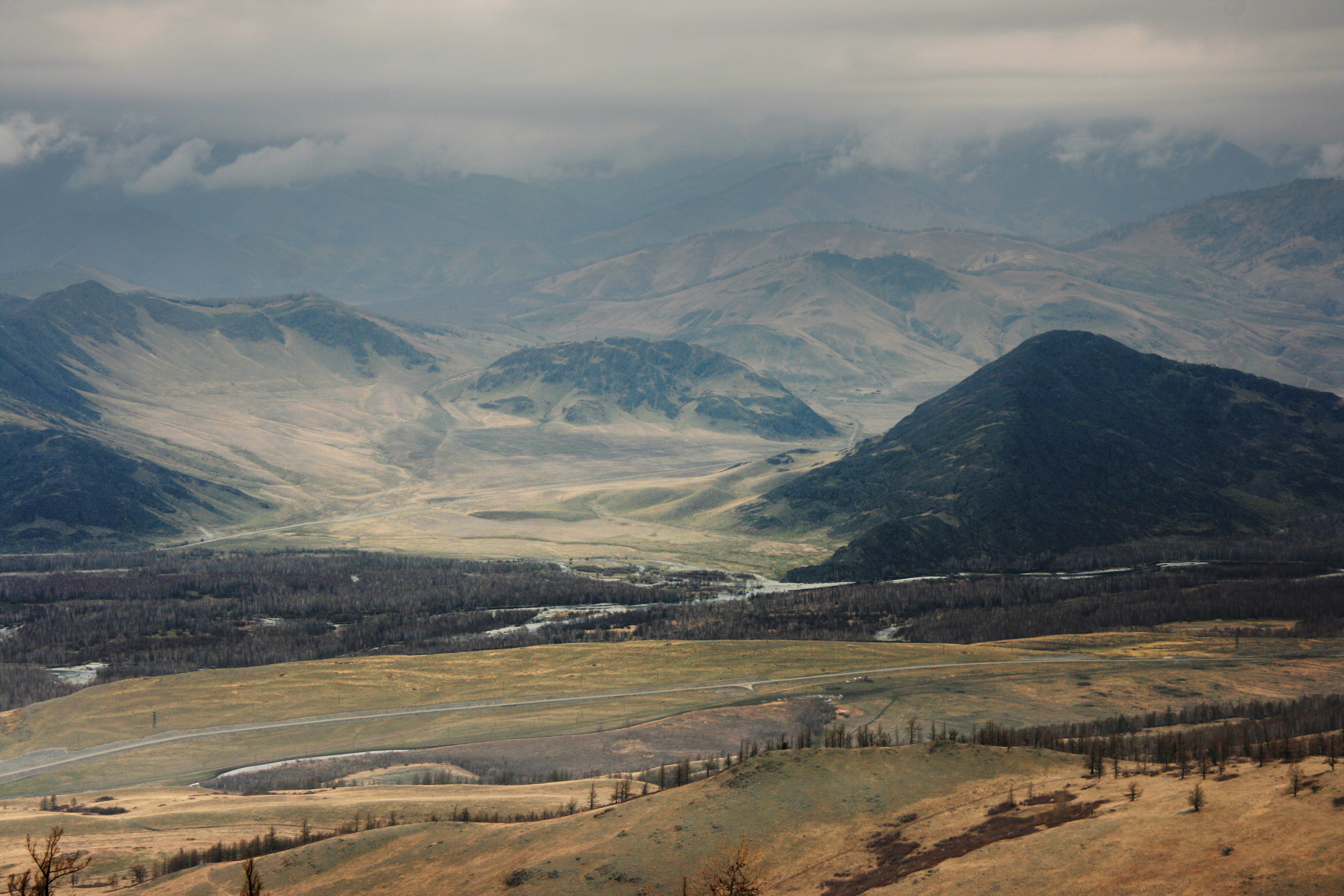
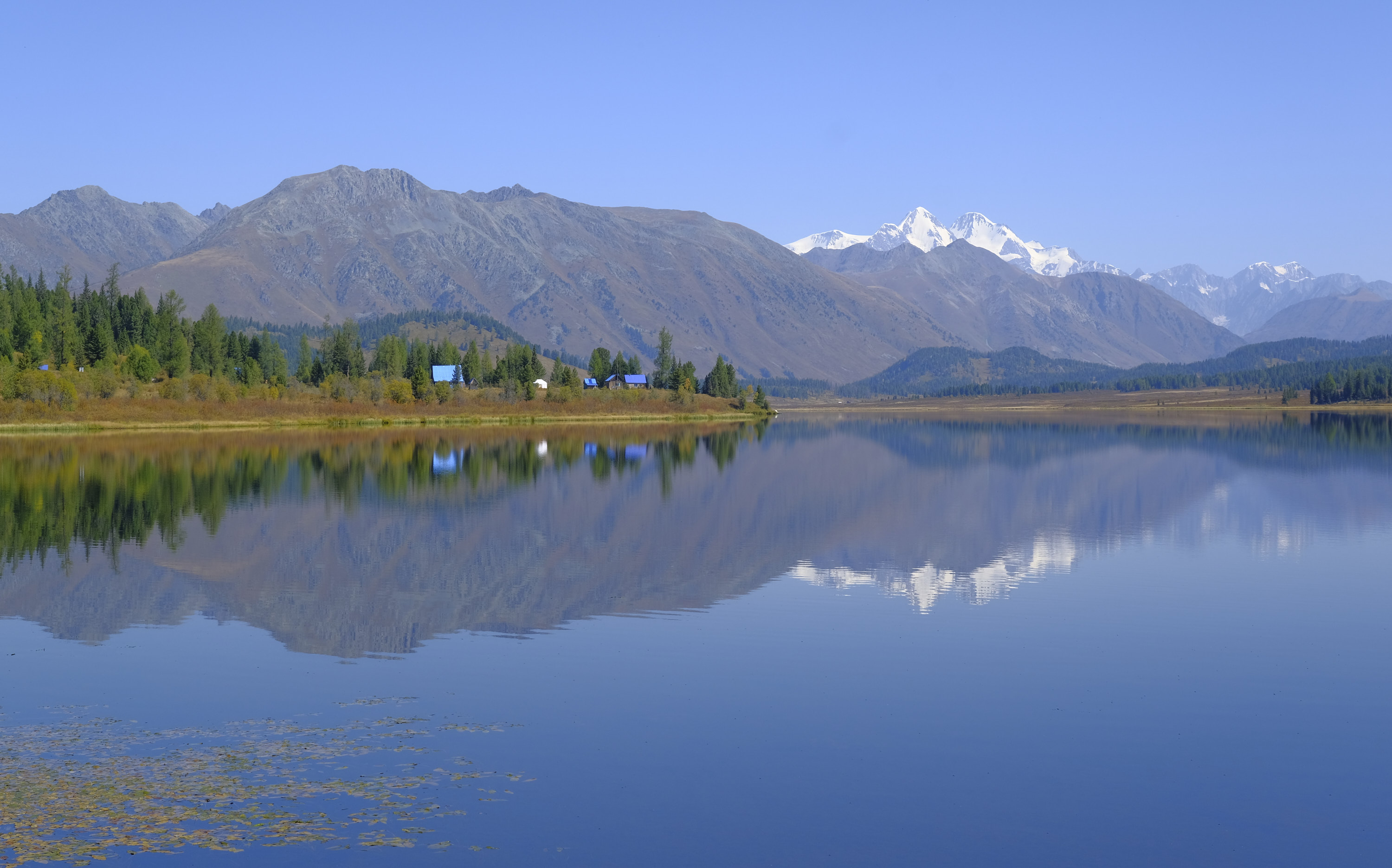
- From the top, Altai Mountains, Bukhtarma River Yazevoye Lake

- Flag Coat of arms

- Map of Kazakhstan, location of East Kazakhstan Region highlighted
- Coordinates: 49°57′N 82°37′E
- Country: Kazakhstan
- Established: 1932
- Capital: Öskemen

Government
  - Akim: Ermek Kosherbayev

Area
  - Total: 97,726 km^{2} (37,732 sq mi)

Population (2025)
  - Total: 723,967
  - Density: 7.4081/km^{2} (19.187/sq mi)

GDP (Nominal, 2024)
  - Total: KZT 4,801 billion (US$ 10.081 billion) · 10th
  - Per capita: KZT 6,617,000 (US$ 13,896)
- Time zone: UTC+5
  - Summer (DST): UTC+5 (not observed)
- Postal codes: 070000
- Area codes: +7 (722), +7 (723)
- ISO 3166 code: KZ-VOS
- Vehicle registration: 16, F, U
- Districts: 15
- Cities: 10
- Townships: 30
- Villages: 870
- HDI (2022): 0.787 high · 5th
- Website: akimvko.gov.kz

East Kazakhstan Region (Note: Kazakh: Шығыс Қазақстан облысы, romanized: Şyğys Qazaqstan oblysy; Russian: Восточно-Казахстанская область, romanized: Vostochno-Kazakhstanskaya oblast) is a region of Kazakhstan. It occupies the easternmost part of Kazakhstan, and includes parts of the Irtysh River, Lake Markakol, and Lake Zaysan. Its administrative center is Öskemen (also known as Ust'-Kamenogorsk). The region borders Altai Krai and Altai republic in Russia in the north and northeast and the People's Republic of China, via Xinjiang, in the south and southeast. The easternmost point of the Oblast is within about 55 kilometres of the westernmost tip of Mongolia; however, Kazakhstan and Mongolia do not share a common border, as the two countries are separated by a small part of the China–Russia border with easternmost point of Kazakhstan and Mongolian Friendship peak being only 37 kilometers apart.

The region was created by the merger of two Soviet-era Kazakhstan oblasts: the old Vostochno-Kazakhstanskaya (East Kazakhstan) Oblast and Semipalatinsk Oblast. On 17 March 2022, it was announced that East Kazakhstan region would be divided, creating the Abai Region. This came into force on 8 June 2022, with eight districts of East Kazakhstan Region being transferred to the new region. The new border dividing Abai Region and East Kazakhstan region roughly corresponds to the border that existed between the two Soviet-era oblasts.

== Geography ==
East Kazakhstan Region borders Abai Region to the west, Russia's Altai Krai and Altai Republic to the north and China's Xinjiang Uyghur Autonomous Region to the south and east.

The region occupies a very diverse range of geographic and climatic regions with the Altai Mountains in the east and the eastern margins of the Kazakh Steppe in the west of the region.

== Demographics ==
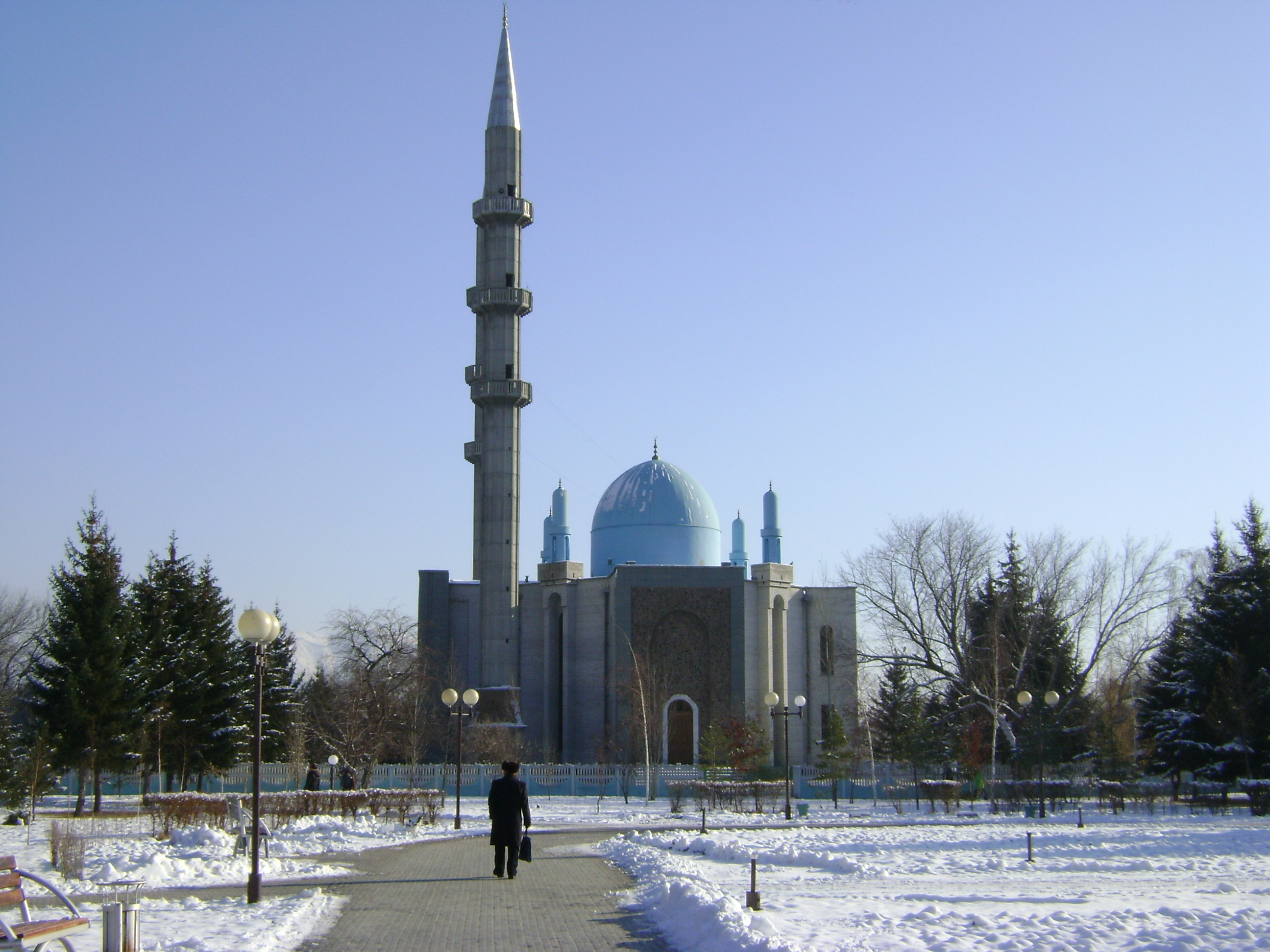
Mosque in Öskemen

As of 2026, the East Kazakhstan Region has a population of 718,995.

=== Ethnic Groups ===
Ethnic composition of the region at the beginning of 2026:

- Kazakh: 51.19%
- Russian: 43.99%
- German: 1.39%
- Tatar: 0.85%
- Ukrainians: 0.76%
- Belarusians: 0.24%
- Azerbaijanis: 0.19%
- Chechens: 0.14%
- Uzbeks: 0.14%
- Koreans: 0.13%
- Others: 0.98%

=== Religions ===
Religious composition of the population according to 2021 census, which also included what is now the Abai region, is below:

Religion	Population	%
Islam	846,457	63.11
Christianity	447,764	33.38
No Religion	28,108	2.10
Buddhism	516	0.04
Judaism	250	0.02
Other Religion	2,218	0.17
Not Stated	15,979	1.19

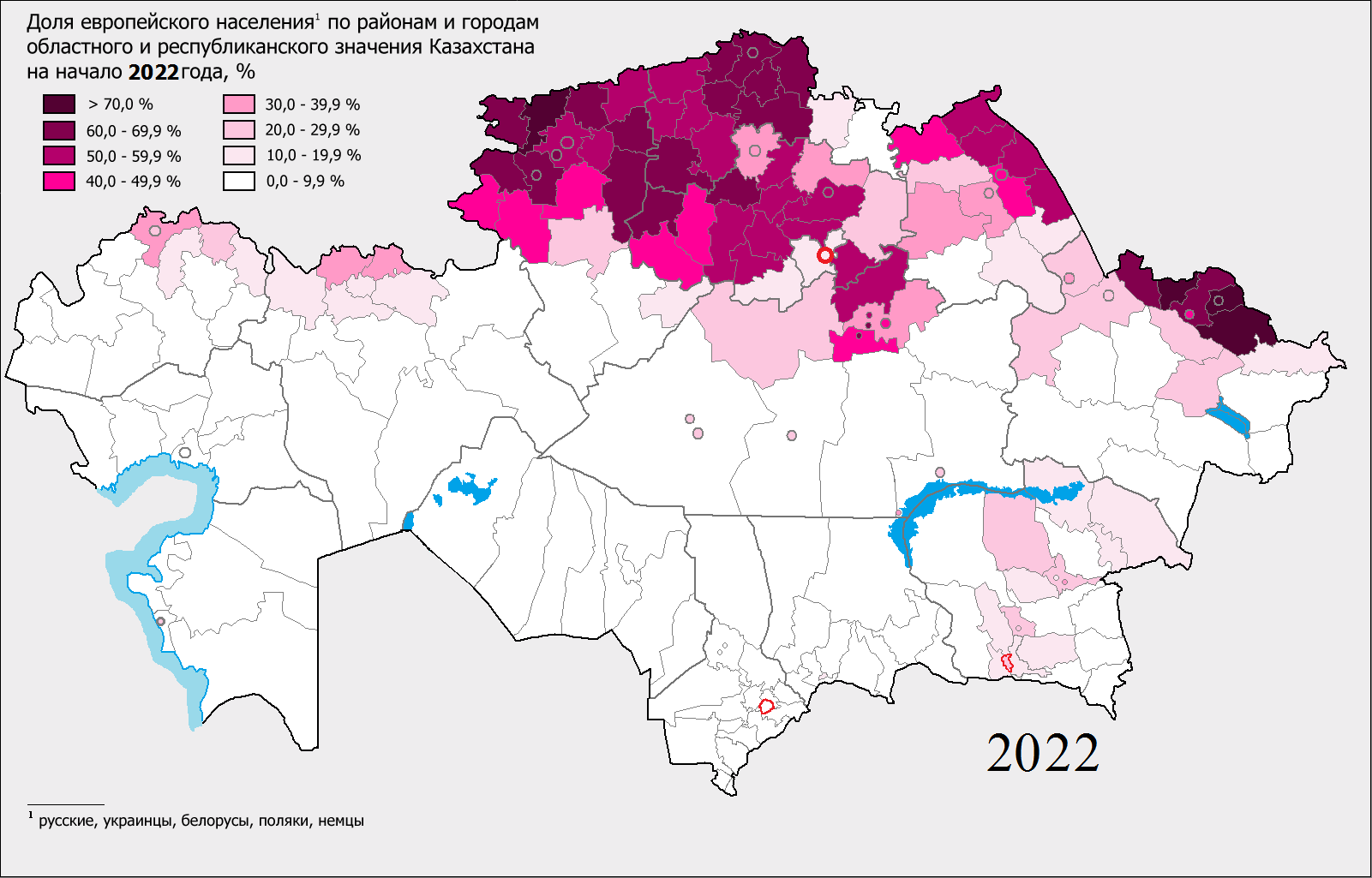
The share of the European population by districts and cities of regional and republican subordination Kazakhstan in 2022 > 70٪ 60.0 – 69.9 % 50.0 - 59.9 % 40.0 - 49.9 % 30.0 - 39.9 % 20.0 - 29.9 % 10.0 - 19.9 % 0.0 - 9.9 %

Historical population
Year	Pop.	±% p.a.
1979	1,657,403	—
1989	1,767,225	+0.64%
1999	1,531,024	−1.42%
2009	1,396,593	−0.91%
2021	1,363,656	−0.20%
Source: Citypopulation

== Administrative divisions ==
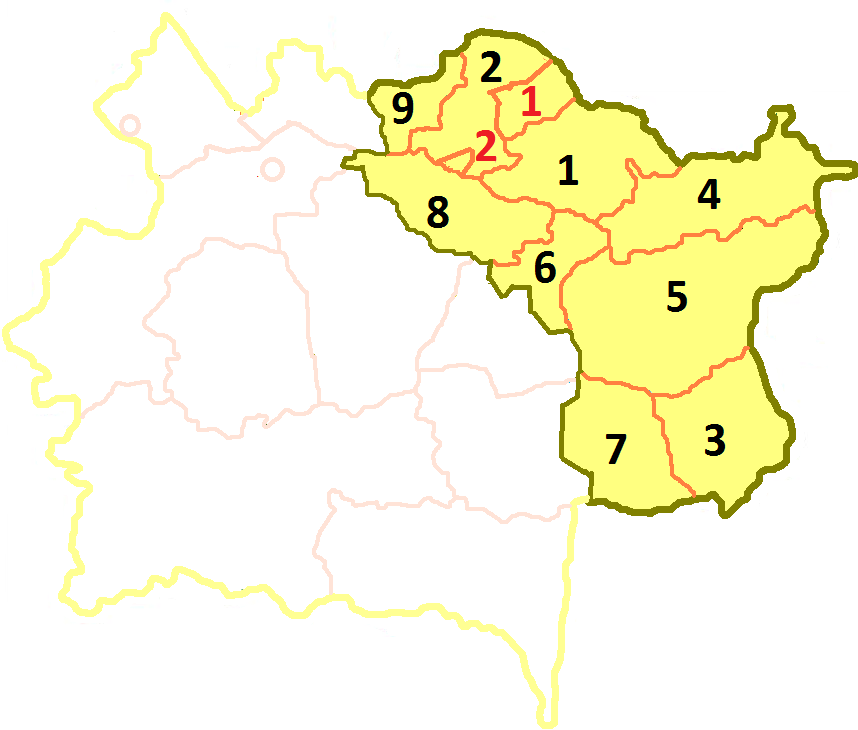
The districts of the region as of 2022

The region is administratively divided into eleven districts and the cities of Öskemen (Ust-Kamenogorsk), Ridder, and Altai.

1. Altai District, the town of Altai;
2. Glubokoye District, the settlement of Glubokoye;
3. Katonkaragay District, the village of Katonkaragay;
4. Kurshim District, the village of Kurshim;
5. Markakol, the village of Markakol;
6. Samar, the village of Samar;
7. Tarbagatay District, the village of Aksuat;
8. Ulan District, the settlement of Molodyozhny;
9. Shemonaikha District, the town of Shemonaikha;
10. Ulken Naryn, the settlement of Ulken Naryn;
11. Zaysan District, the town of Zaysan;

^{*} The following localities in East Kazakhstan Region have town status: Öskemen (Ust-Kamenogorsk), Ayagoz, Shar, Ridder, Serebryansk, Shemonaikha, Zaysan, and Altai (Zyryan).

== Economy ==
East Kazakhstan Region's economy is dominated by industry, particularly the metallurgy industry, although the region also has a significant energy industry, forestry industry, food industry, and various light industries.

₸619.4 billion was invested in the regional economy, an increase of 23.0%. A significant increase in investment was observed in industry (30.6%), transport and warehousing (36.2%), agriculture (13.8%), and construction (7.2%). Investments in fixed assets increased by 5.4% to ₸59.7 billion.

Since 2010, 74 investment projects have been implemented, at a value of ₸1.3 trillion, creating 17,600 jobs, including 3 projects of national significance.

For the period from 2010 to 2019, 50 projects were commissioned for a total of ₸731.4 billion, creating 8,600 jobs, including 4 projects in 2019 for a total of ₸24.1 billion, creating 164 jobs.

In 2020, the region plans to implement 5 projects totaling ₸16.0 billion, creating 610 jobs.

From 2021 to 2025, the region plans to implement 19 projects with a total investment of ₸555.0 billion and the creation of 8.4 thousand new jobs.

Significant industrial projects planned by the region include the construction of an automobile plant and industrial park for the production of automotive components in Öskemen under the joint-stock company "Asia Auto Kazakhstan" in 2021, and the expansion of processing capacities of Aktogay GOK by duplicating the existing sulfide factory run by KAZ Minerals Aktogay LLP in 2021.

In January–February 2020, ₸59.7 billion was invested in the regional economy, with an increase of 105.4%.

=== Agriculture ===
During the first half of 2020, the region's agricultural output totaled ₸157.1 billion, of which, ₸155.9 billion came from cattle breeding, and ₸1.1 billion came from crop growing. Investments in agricultural fixed assets in the first half of 2020 totaled to ₸14.7 billion.

In the first half of 2020, 1.371. million hectares of crops were sown. During that time, the region recorded 1.2777 million heads of cattle, 477.4 thousand heads of horses, and 2.1759 million heads of sheep and goats.

=== Industry ===
In the first half of 2020, the region's industrial output totaled ₸1.0973 trillion. During this period, the region's mining industry accounted for ₸286.7 billion in output, the metallurgy industry accounted for ₸489.5 billion, the machine-building industry accounted for ₸120.4 billion, the chemicals industry accounted for ₸10.9 billion, woodworking accounted for ₸2.5 billion, light industry accounted for ₸2.3 billion, and another ₸185 billion came from other industries.

The bulk of the region's metallurgical products are exported.

The region's machine-building industry mostly produces mining equipment, equipment for mineral processing, oil and gas production, industrial capacitors, cables and wires, and vehicles.

== Education ==
As of 2019, the region has 312 libraries, 10 museums, and 1 "institution for the protection of historical and cultural heritage".

== Culture ==
As of 2019, the region has 301 culture clubs, 2 theaters, a zoo, 9 "houses of friendship", 6 cinemas, and 3 parks.

In 2018, the Kazakhstan Ministry of Culture funded archaeological excavations into the Shilikty Mounds and other nearby sites in the region to uncover cultural artifacts.

== Tourism ==
The Altai Alps ski resort, in the town of Tawlı Ülbi approximately 24 kilometres east of Öskemen, serves as a popular skiing destination.

The Raxman Spring Sanatorium and the Katon-Karagay National Park are both located in the Katonkaragay District in the northeastern part of the region.

== Sport ==
The region sent a bandy team to the Spartakiade 2009 and finished third.

== See also ==
- Semipalatinsk Test Site
- Russian irredentism
- Russian imperialism
