= Katonkaragay District =

Katonkaragay
- District
- Катонқарағай ауданы Катон-Карагайский район
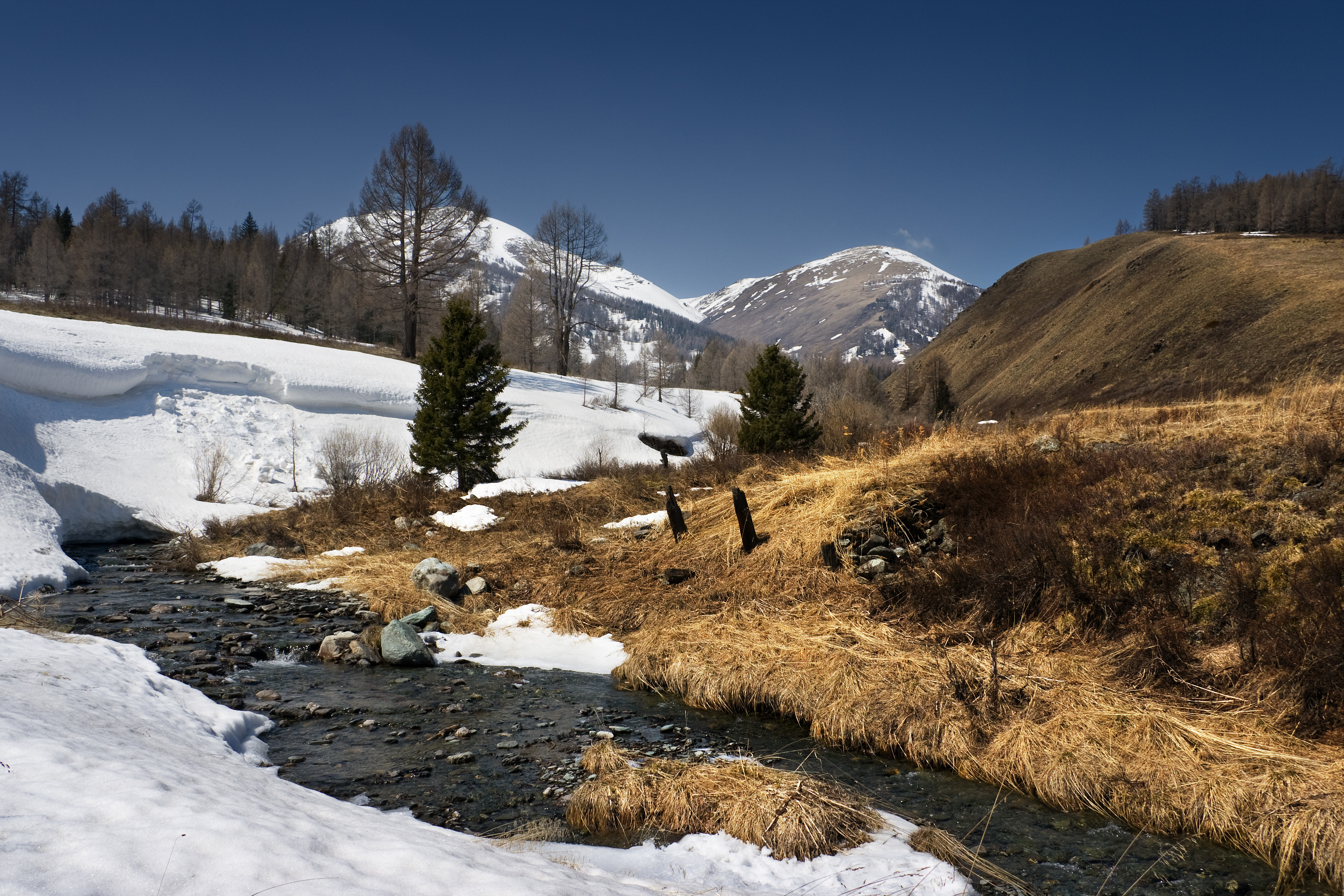
- Kara-Koba River, Markakol Nature Reserve

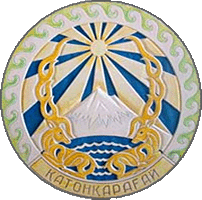
- Coat of arms

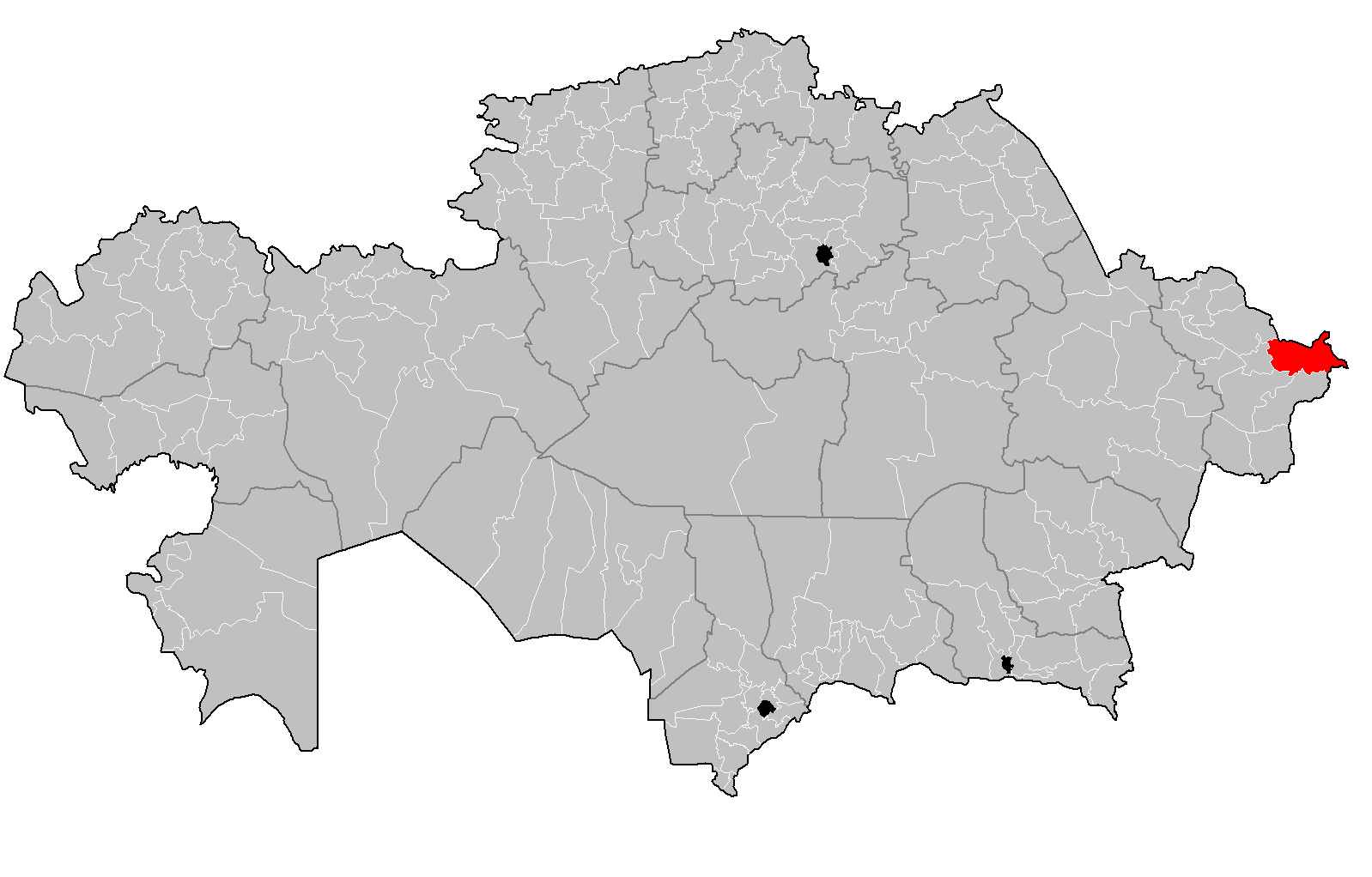

- Location within Continental Asia
- Coordinates: 49.2113°N 84.5138°E
- Country: Kazakhstan
- Region: East Kazakhstan Region
- Administrative center: Katonkaragay
- Founded: 1928

Government
  - Akim: Calican Dildar Kalikanovich

Area
  - Total: 13,167 km^{2} (5,084 sq mi)

Population (2013)
  - Total: 28,008
- Time zone: UTC+6 (East)

Katonkaragay, also spelled Katon-Karagay (Kazakh: Қатонқарағай ауданы, romanized: Qatonqarağai audany) is a district of East Kazakhstan Region in eastern Kazakhstan. The administrative center of the district is the selo of Katonkaragay. It is the easternmost district in Kazakhstan. Population: 28,008 (2013 estimate); 30,056 (2009 census results); 45,149 (1999 census results).

== Berel burial mound ==
Near the selo of Berel (49°22′24″N 86°26′17″E) excavations of ancient burial mounds have revealed artefacts the sophistication of which are encouraging a revaluation of the nomadic cultures of the 3rd and 4th centuries BC.
