= List of major power stations in Xinjiang =

This page lists the major power stations located in Xinjiang.

== Non-renewable ==
=== Coal-based ===
Station	Name in Chinese	Coordinates	Capacity (MW)	Operational units	Under construction units	Reference
Xinjiang Dongfang Xiwang Power Station	新疆东方希望有色金属自备电厂	44°41′03″N 89°06′56″E	6,140	10×350 MW, 4×660 MW		
Zhongxinjian Bingzhun Power Station	中新建电力兵准园区煤电项目		3,960		6×660MW	
Nongliushi Power Station	农六师煤电有限公司	44°16′05″N 87°41′31″E	3,640	4×360 MW, 2×1,100 MW		
Xinjiang Qiya Alumina Power Station	新疆其亚铝电自备电厂	44°51′32″N 89°01′29″E	2,820	6×360 MW	1×660 MW	
Shenghua Guoneng Hami Power Station	神华国能哈密电厂	42°24′27″N 93°0′48″E	2,640	4×660 MW		
Wucaiwan North 1st Power Station	五彩湾北一电厂	44°51′17″N 89°12′02″E	2,640	4×660 MW		
Wucaiwan North 2nd Power Station	五彩湾北二电厂	44°50′09″N 89°11′43″E	2,640	4×660 MW		
Tianshan Aluminum Power Station	天山铝业天瑞能源自备电厂	44°25′40″N 86°05′51″E	2,100	6×350 MW		
Wucaiwan Power Station	五彩湾电厂	44°47′46″N 89°08′56″E	2,020	2×350 MW, 2×660 MW		
Huadian Kashi Power Station	新疆华电喀什热电	39°28′54″N 76°03′06″E	2,020	2×350 MW, 2×660 MW		
Huadian Hami Power Plant	华电哈密电厂	44°32′13″N 92°55′38″E	2,000	2×1,000 MW		
Xijiang Zhongneng Shitoumei Power Station	新疆重能石头梅电厂	44°32′20″N 92°55′25″E	2,000	2×1,000 MW		
Tianfu Energy Tianhe Power Station	天富能源公司天河热电分公司	44°26′24″N 86°05′40″E	1,980	2×660 MW, 2×330 MW		
Xinjiang Shenhua Power Station	新疆神火煤电有限公司	44°53′38″N 89°03′02″E	1,400	4×350 MW		
Jiarun Resources Power Station	新疆嘉润资源自备电厂	44°18′44″N 86°25′05″E	1,400	4×350 MW		
Wucaiwan North 3rd Power Station	五彩湾北三电厂	44°48′17″N 89°11′37″E	1,320	2×660 MW		
Wucaiwan Henglian Power Station	五彩湾恒联电厂	44°47′23″N 89°11′19″E	1,320	2×660 MW		
Xinyou Qitai Power Station	信友奇台电厂	44°33′10″N 90°15′16″E	1,320	2×660 MW		
Guoxing Zhundong Power Station	国信准东煤电项目	44°32′32″N 90°15′15″E	1,320	2×660 MW		
Hami Guotou Power Station	国投哈密电厂	42°18′21″N 93°21′04″E	1,320	2×660 MW		
Hami Guodian Power Station	国电哈密电厂	42°19′05″N 93°11′15″E	1,320	2×660 MW		
Hongxing Power Station	哈密红星电厂	42°18′51″N 93°39′05″E	1,320	2×660 MW		
Lu'an Xiexing Zhundong Power Station	新疆潞安协鑫准东能源	44°42′22″N 89°40′14″E	1,320	2×660 MW		
Guowang Zhundong Power Station	国网能源新疆准东煤电	44°46′51″N 89°35′13″E	1,320	2×660 MW		
Huadian Changji Yinggema Power Station	华电昌吉英格玛煤电一体化坑口电厂	44°33′18″N 90°14′9″E	1,320	2×660 MW		
Tianchi Energy Wucaiwan Power Station	天池能源五彩湾电厂	44°44′06″N 89°05′34″E	1,320	2×660 MW		
Tacheng Power Station	塔城国家电投煤电一体化项目		1,320		2×660 MW	
Changdong Power Station	昌东电厂	44°51′15″N 89°01′47″E	1,320		2×660 MW	
Bole Power Station	国能博州	44°49′36″N 82°16′39″E	1,320		2×660 MW	
Zhongmei Yili Power Station	中煤伊犁能源	44°4′37″N 81°29′25″E	1,320		2×660 MW	
Tianye Power Station	新疆天业自备电厂	44°21′19″N 86°02′32″E	1,260	2×300 MW, 2×330 MW		
Xinhong Power Station	兵准信泓电厂	44°44′07″N 89°05′31″E	1,200	2×600 MW		
Hongyanchi Huadian Power Station	红雁池华电电厂	43°44′36″N 87°39′27″E	800	4×200 MW		
Luntai Power Station	华能轮台热电厂	41°49′44″N 84°02′01″E	700	2×350 MW		
Karamay Power Station	国电克拉玛依电厂	45°32′32″N 85°01′29″E	700	2×350 MW		
Aksu Textile Industry Zone Power Station	阿克苏纺织工业城热电厂	41°09′16″N 80°23′58″E	700	2×350 MW		
Kurle Thermal Power Station	库尔勒热电厂	41°39′50″N 86°15′52″E	700	2×350 MW		
Tumxuk Thermal Power Station	图木舒克热电厂	39°50′22″N 79°01′53″E	700	2×350 MW		
Changji Thermal Power Station	昌吉热电联产	44°00′17″N 87°10′16″E	700	2×350 MW		
Xinte Energy Power Station	新特能源公司自备电厂	44°07′28″N 87°46′15″E	700	2×350 MW		
Guoneng Yili Thermal Power Station	国家能源集团伊犁电厂	43°51′38″N 81°17′58″E	700	2×350 MW		
Tiandian Qitai Power Station	新疆天电奇台能源电厂	44°03′07″N 89°39′02″E	700	2×350 MW		
Huadian Gaochang Power Station	华电高昌电厂	42°52′45″N 89°10′02″E	700	2×350 MW		
Hesheng Shanshan Power Station	合盛电业鄯善电厂	42°58′27″N 90°07′33″E	700	2×350 MW		
Guotai Xinhua Chemical Power Station	新疆国泰新华化工自备电厂	44°41′41″N 89°04′10″E	700	2×350 MW		
Hetian Power Station	和田热电联产电厂	37°15′58″N 79°59′28″E	700		2×350 MW	
Jimsar Power Station	吉木萨尔热电联产电厂	43°57′34″N 89°13′02″E	700		2×350 MW	
Kokdala Power Station	第四师可克达拉热电联产		700		2×350 MW	
Xinjiang Jinlong Shengwu Thermal Power Station	新疆锦龙神雾能源热电联产	44°46′59″N 84°53′58″E	700	2×350 MW		
Ruoqiang Tianchi Thermal Power Station	若羌天池能源热电联产	38°56′53″N 88°19′32″E	700	2×350 MW		
Tianfu South Power Station	天富南热电厂	44°15′32″N 86°06′29″E	660	2×330 MW		
Hongyanchi Guodian Power Station	红雁池国电电厂	43°43′36″N 87°37′45″E	660	2×330 MW		
Ürümqi Thermal Power Station	乌鲁木齐热电厂	43°54′04″N 87°41′51″E	660	2×330 MW		
Wusu Power Station	乌苏电厂	44°26′11″N 84°45′38″E	660	2×330 MW		
Huadian Changji Power Station	华电昌吉热电厂	44°03′47″N 87°19′37″E	660	2×330 MW		
Guotou Yili Power Station	国投伊犁电厂	43°55′40″N 81°13′24″E	660	2×330 MW		
Xinjiang West Hesheng Thermal Power Station	新疆西部合盛热电有限公司	44°27′21″N 86°05′55″E	660	2×330 MW		
Zhongtai Chemical Toksun Power Station	中泰化学托克逊能化自备电厂	42°44′13″N 88°38′25″E	660	2×330 MW		
Kuqa Power Station	库车电厂	41°44′18″N 82°53′11″E	660	2×330 MW		
Yihua Chemical Power Station	新疆宜化化工自备电厂	44°53′47″N 89°14′47″E	660	2×330 MW		
Xinjiang Dongming Plastic Power Station	新疆东明塑胶有限公司自备电厂	44°41′45″N 89°07′04″E	640	2×100 MW, 2×220 MW		
Midong Power Station	米东热电厂	43°56′45″N 87°39′50″E	600	2×300 MW		
Dananhu Power Station	大南湖电厂	42°44′27″N 93°26′44″E	600	2×300 MW		
Hefeng Power Station	神华国能和丰发电厂	46°36′30″N 86°35′27″E	600	2×300 MW		
Hutubi Thermal Power Station	大唐呼图壁热电厂	44°09′00″N 86°49′21″E	600	2×300 MW		
Hami Dananhu Power Station	哈密煤电大南湖电厂	42°44′27″N 93°26′43″E	600	2×300 MW		
Manas Power Station	玛纳斯电厂	44°19′04″N 86°10′05″E	600	2×300 MW		
Shengxiong Energy Power Station	圣雄能源自备电厂	42°49′08″N 87°57′29″E	600	2×300 MW		
Aksu Power Station	徐矿集团新疆阿克苏电厂	41°04′43″N 80°10′08″E	400	2×200 MW		

== Renewable ==
=== Hydroelectric ===
==== Conventional ====
Station	Name in Chinese	Coordinates	River	Total capacity (MW)	Dam height (meters)	Status	Units
Aertaashi Hydro Power Station	阿尔塔什水利枢纽工程	37°57′31″N 76°27′30″E	Yarkand	755	164.8	Operational	4×175 MW, 2×27.5 MW
Chonghu'er Dam	冲乎尔水电站	48°11′00″N 86°09′05″E	Burqin River	110	74 m (243 ft)	Operational	4×27.5 MW
Jilebulake Dam	吉勒布拉克水电站	48°15′52″N 86°23′56″E	Haba River	160	146.3 m (480 ft)	Operational	2×50 MW, 2×30 MW
Jilintai 1st Hydro Power Station	吉林台一级水电站	43°51′44″N 82°50′43″E	Kash River	460	157 m (515 ft)	Operational	4×115 MW
Jilintai 2nd Hydro Power Station	吉林台二级水电站	43°50′40″N 82°47′04″E	Kash River	100	33.8 m (111 ft)	Operational	2×50 MW
Nileke 1st Hydro Power Station	尼勒克一级水电站	43°50′08″N 82°01′10″E	Kash River	220		Operational	4×55
Chahanwusu Hydro Power Station	察汗乌苏水电站	42°19′53″N 85°30′44″E	Kaidu River	309		Operational	3×103 MW
Liushugou Hydro Power Station	柳树沟水电站		Kaidu River	190		Operational	
Horgotu Hydro Power Station	霍尔古吐水电站	42°22′6″N 85°2′6″E	Kaidu River	426.5		Under construction	
Burqin Shankou Dam	布尔津山口水利枢纽工程	47°54′13″N 87°12′15″E	Burqin River	220	95 m (312 ft)	Operational	
Yamaguchi Dam	哈巴河山口水电站	48°11′01″N 86°25′35″E	Haba River	25.2	40.5 m (133 ft)	Operational	4×6.3 MW
Xiabandi Hydro Power Station	下坂地水利枢纽电站	37°50′17″N 75°34′22″E	Tashkurgan River	150	78 m (256 ft)	Operational	3×50 MW
Qirehazier Hydro Power Station	齐热哈塔尔水电站	37°50′37″N 75°35′20″E	Tashkurgan River	210	16.8 m (55 ft)	Operational	3×70 MW
Qiamusa Hydro Power Station	恰木萨水电站	37°30′41″N 77°05′41″E	Yarkand River	203		Operational	
Dashixia Hydro Power Station	大石峡水利枢纽	41°38′54″N 79°32′53″E	Kumalake River	780	247	Under construction	
Xiaoshixia Hydro Power Station	小石峡水电站	41°34′19″N 79°37′03″E	Kumalake River	137.5	63.3	Operational	5×27.5 MW
Bulunkou-Gonggeer Hydro Power Station	布仑口—公格尔水电站	38°46′21″N 75°12′59″E	Gaizi River	200	35	Operational	
Biedieli Hydro Power Station	别迭里水电站	40°56′25″N 78°32′20″E	Tuoshigan River	248		Operational	
Xiate Hydro Power Station	夏特水电站	39°39′42″N 74°44′55″E	Kizil River	248		Operational	4×62 MW

=== Pumped-storage ===
Station	Name in Chinese	Coordinates	Capacity (MW)	Rated head (meters)	Status	Operational units	Under construction units
Ruoqiang Pumped Storage Power Station	若羌抽水蓄能电站		2,100	717	Under construction		6×350 MW
Hejing Pumped Storage Power Station	和静抽水蓄能电站		2,100	636	Under construction		6×350 MW
Buerjin Pumped Storage Power Station	布尔津抽水蓄能电站		1,400	615	Under construction		4×350 MW
Fukang Pumped Storage Power Station	阜康抽水蓄能电站	43°59′25″N 88°28′12″E	1,200	528	Operational	4×300 MW	
Hami Pumped-storage Hydro Power Station	哈密抽水蓄能电站	43°08′29″N 93°55′43″E	1,200		Under construction		4×300 MW

=== Solar ===
Station	Name in Chinese	Coordinates	Total capacity (MW)
Aksu PV power station	阿克苏光伏电站	41°02′58″N 80°06′19″E	160
Midong Solar Park		44.725°N 87.679°E	3,500

== See also ==
- List of power stations in China
