= Sedelnikovo =

Sedelnikovo (Russian: Седельниково) is the name of several rural localities in Russia:

- Sedelnikovo, Krasnoyarsk Krai, a village in Vysotinsky Selsoviet of Sukhobuzimsky District of Krasnoyarsk Krai
- Sedelnikovo, Nizhny Novgorod Oblast, a village in Ilyinsky Selsoviet of Volodarsky District of Nizhny Novgorod Oblast
- Sedelnikovo, Omsk Oblast, a selo in Sedelnikovsky Rural Okrug of Sedelnikovsky District of Omsk Oblast
- Sedelnikovo, Vladimir Oblast, a village in Vyaznikovsky District of Vladimir Oblast
