= Project 635 Dam =

Dam in Fuhai, Xinjiang, China

- Location within China
- Country: China
- Location: Fuhai County, Xinjiang Uighur Autonomous Region
- Coordinates: 47°14′29″N 88°28′34″E
- Purpose: Irrigation, power
- Status: Operational
- Construction began: 1998
- Opening date: 2001

Dam and spillways
- Type of dam: Embankment, rock-fill with clay core
- Impounds: Irtysh River
- Height: 70.6 m (232 ft)
- Length: 1,900 m (6,200 ft)
- Elevation at crest: 650 m (2,130 ft)

Reservoir
- Total capacity: 282,000,000 m^{3} (229,000 acre⋅ft)
- Normal elevation: 645 m (2,116 ft)

Power Station
- Commission date: 2001
- Installed capacity: 32 MW

The Project 635 Dam (Chinese: "635"水利枢纽工程; pinyin: "635" shuǐlì shūniǔ gōngchéng) is one of the three dams constructed on the Irtysh River in China's Xinjiang Uighur Autonomous Region. The embankment dam is located in Fuhai County, about 56 km east of Beitun. It creates a reservoir (the Project 635 Reservoir, Chinese: "635"水库), which serves as the source of water for the Irtysh–Karamay–Ürümqi Canal.

Water from the reservoir is used for industry, agriculture and power. Construction on the dam began in 1998 and it began to impound its reservoir in 2000. The dam was complete in 2001.

== Proposed water transfer from the Burqin River ==
The Project 635 reservoir is required not only to supply the Irtysh–Karamay–Ürümqi Canal with water, but also to maintain a sufficient amount of water flow in the Irtysh below the dam, for the local agricultural use and ecosystem maintenance. To improve the water balance at the reservoir, the local authorities are envisioning the so-called Project for Bringing Western Water to the East (西水东引工程). The project would involve the construction of a canal whereby water could be transferred from the Burqin Shankou Reservoir on the Burqin River to the Project 635 reservoir on the Irtysh. Even though the Burqin is a tributary of the Irtysh, its natural confluence point with the Irtysh is in Burqin Town (the county seat of Burqin County), which is over 100 km downstream from the Project 635 Dam, and in the absence of the "Bringing Western Water to the East" canal its waters would not be available at the Project 635 location.

== See also ==
- List of dams and reservoirs in China
- List of major power stations in Xinjiang
