= Sedelnikovsky District =

Sedelnikovsky District Седельниковский район
- District
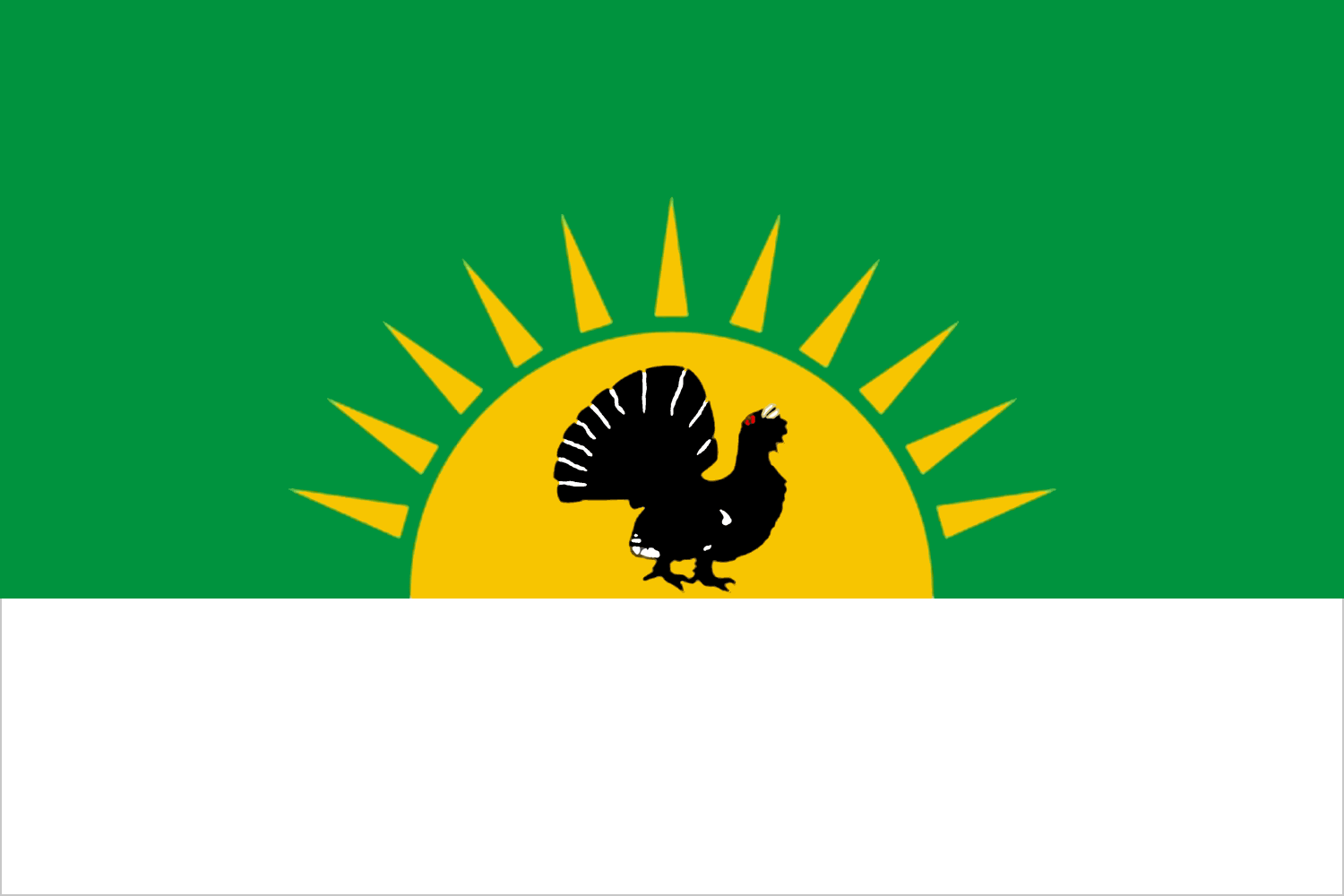
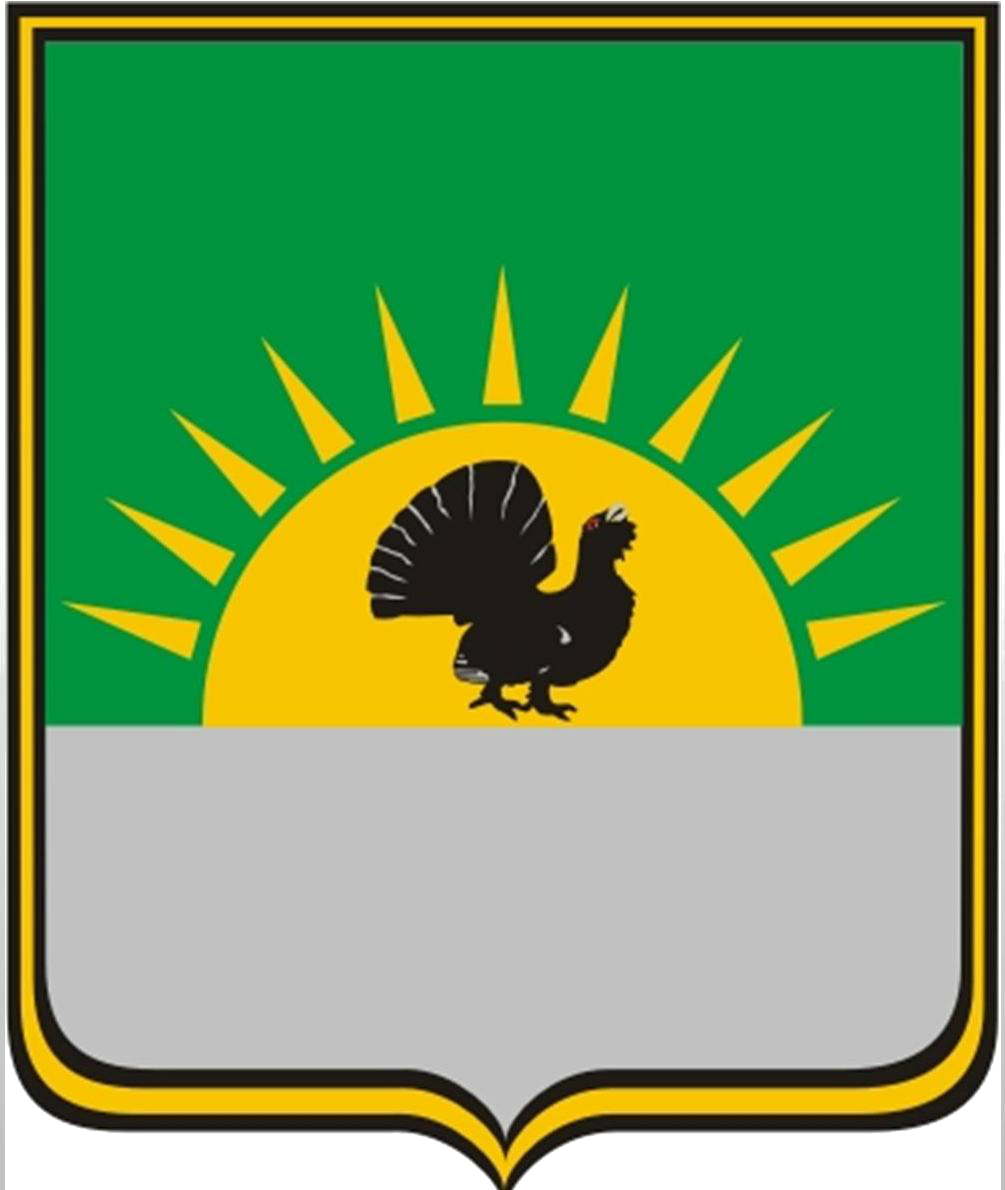
- Flag Coat of arms
- Location of Sedelnikovsky District in Omsk Oblast
- Coordinates: 56°57′N 75°20′E
- Country: Russia
- Federal subject: Omsk Oblast
- Established: 1924
- Administrative center: Sedelnikovo

Area
  - Total: 5,200 km^{2} (2,000 sq mi)

Population (2010 Census)
  - Total: 10,943
  - Density: 2.1/km^{2} (5.5/sq mi)
  - Urban: 0%
  - Rural: 100%

Administrative structure
  - Administrative divisions: 11 rural okrug
  - Inhabited localities: 34 rural localities

Municipal structure
  - Municipally incorporated as: Sedelnikovsky Municipal District
  - Municipal divisions: 0 urban settlements, 11 rural settlements
- Time zone: UTC+6 (MSK+3)
- OKTMO ID: 52652000
- Website: http://www.sedel.omskportal.ru/

Sedelnikovsky District (Russian: Седе́льниковский райо́н) is an administrative and municipal district (raion), one of the thirty-two in Omsk Oblast, Russia. It is located in the east of the oblast. The area of the district is 5,200 square kilometers (2,000 sq mi). Its administrative center is the rural locality (a selo) of Sedelnikovo. Population: 10,943 (2010 Census); 12,211 (2002 Census); 12,890 (1989 Soviet census). The population of Sedelnikovo accounts for 48.6% of the district's total population.

== Geography ==
The district is situated in the taiga, although logging has denuded much of the forest. The biggest rivers flowing through the district are the tributaries of the Irtysh, including the Uy, the Shaytanka, the Shish, and the Maly Shish.

== History ==
Prior to 1582, the area of what is now Sedelnikovsky District was a part of the Khanate of Sibir. That year Cossack ataman Yermak Timofeyevich defeated Kuchum Khan at the Battle of Chuvash Cape. Although Yermak was eventually killed after sacking Qashliq to the east, the Russian Empire retained control of the region. The area was secured in 1594 when Prince Andrey Yeletsky established a permanent garrison at Tara to the southwest.

The first settlement in the area was the village of Sedelnikovo, founded in 1785 by Sedelnikov brothers, who moved here from the village of Ostrovnaya.

The modern district was established in 1924.

== Administrative and municipal divisions ==
Administratively, the district is divided into eleven rural okrugs (Bakinsky, Golubovsky, Keyzessky, Kukarsky, Novouysky, Ragozinsky, Saratovsky, Sedelnikovsky, Unarsky, Yevlansky, and Yelnichny) comprising thirty-four rural localities. Municipally, the district is incorporated as Sedelnikovsky Municipal District and divided into eleven rural settlements (which correspond to the administrative rural okrugs).
