= Shankou =

Shankou may refer to:

== China ==
- Shankou, Hepu County, Guangxi
- Shankou, Longyao County, Hebei
- Shankou, Xiushui County, in Xiushui County, Jiangxi
- Shankou, Tai'an, in Daiyue District, Tai'an, Shandong
- Shankou, Qingtian County, Zhejiang
- Burqin Shankou Dam, dam in Burqin County, Xinjiang, China
- Haba River Shankou Dam, dam in Habahe County, Xinjiang, China

== Japan ==
- Yamaguchi in Chinese Pinyin
