= KJI =

KJI or kji may refer to:

- IATA code for Kanas Airport, China
- Kim Jong Il, former Supreme Leader of North Korea
- Zabana language (ISO 639-3 code)
