= Demyanka =

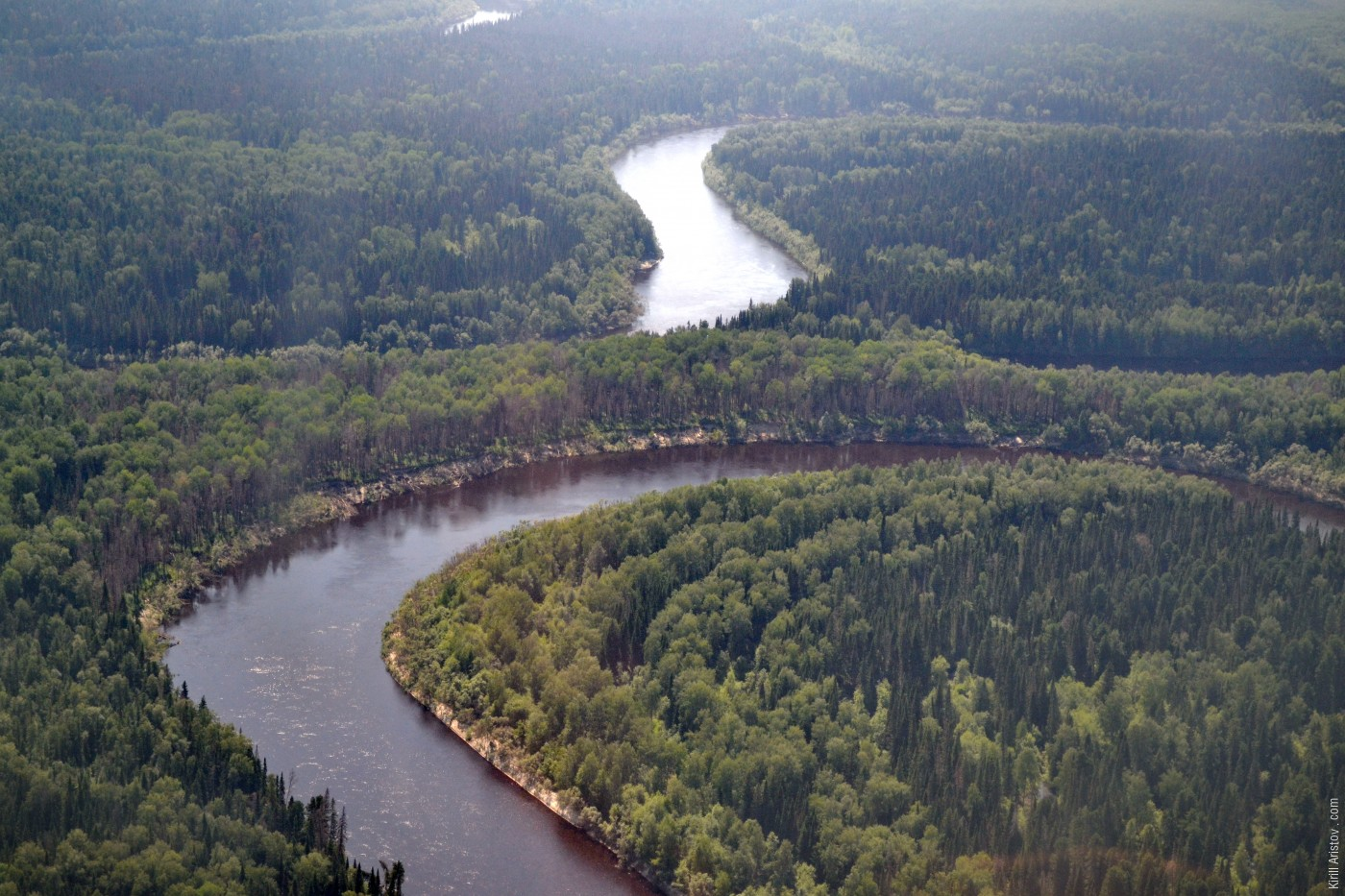
- The lower reaches of Demianka from a height of 400 meters

Location
- Country: Russia

Physical characteristics
- Source
  - location: Vasyugan Swamp
- Mouth: Irtysh
  - coordinates: 59°33′15″N 69°17′58″E
- Length: 1,159 km (720 mi)
- Basin size: 34,800 km^{2} (13,400 sq mi)
- Discharge
  - average: 155 m^{3}/s (5,500 cu ft/s) (167 km from mouth)

Basin features
- Progression: Irtysh→ Ob→ Kara Sea

The Demyanka (Russian: Демьянка) is a river in the Omsk Oblast and Tyumen Oblast, Russia. It is a right tributary of the Irtysh. The river's source lies in the Vasyugan Swamp. It is 1,159 kilometres (720 mi) long, and has a drainage basin of 34,800 square kilometres (13,400 sq mi).

The river bed is unbranched, strongly meandering. The bottom of the river bed is either ooze or sandy. During the spring rise of the water level, the river partially becomes navigable. The riverbed in shallow water is cluttered with fallen trees and bushes. The sloping longitudinal slope is insignificant - 0.034 ‰. Ice drifting takes place on the rise of high water.

The Demyanka basin is significantly swampy: 50% of it is covered by marshes, 45% by forest. Small lakes are numerous, but their surface area does not exceed 2.0%.

On the river there is the settlement of Demyanka, but on the whole the Demyanka basin is sparsely populated. There are no large settlements.
