= Kürshim =

River in Kazakhstan

Kürshim Күршім / Курчум
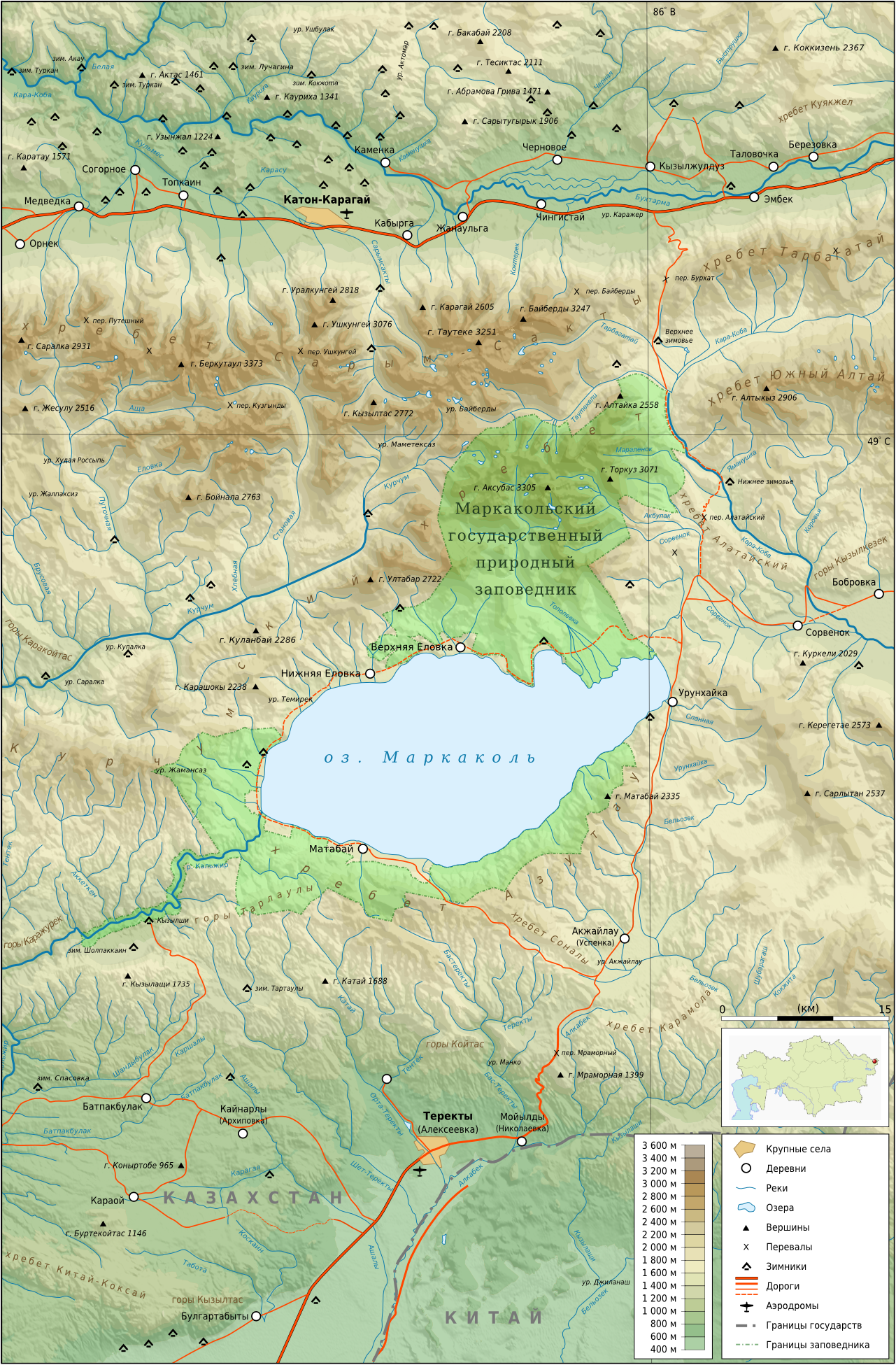

- Mouth location in Kazakhstan

Location
- Countries: Kazakhstan

Physical characteristics
- Mouth: Irtysh
  - coordinates: 48°36′50″N 83°31′43″E

The Kürşım (Kazakh: Күршім, Kürşım; Russian: Курчум, Kurchum) is a river in the East Kazakhstan Region, Kazakhstan. It is a right tributary of the Ertıs (Irtysh).
