= Irtysh =

River in China, Kazakhstan, and Russia

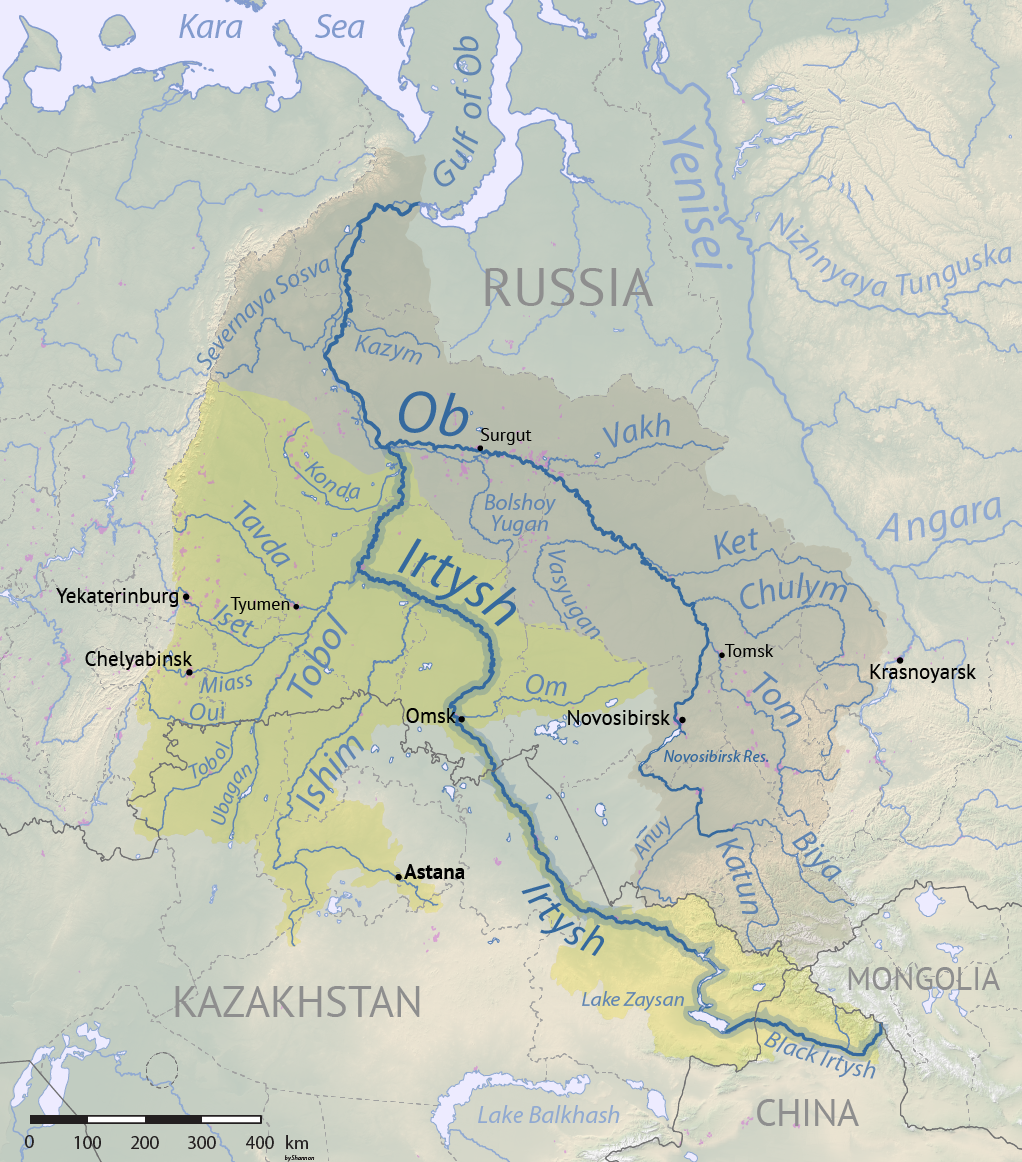
- Irtysh watershed

Location
- Country: Mongolia, China, Kazakhstan, Russia
- Cities: Oskemen, Semey, Pavlodar, Omsk, Tobolsk, Khanty-Mansiysk

Physical characteristics
- Source: Altai Mountains
  - location: Altay Prefecture, China
  - coordinates: 47°52′39″N 89°58′12″E
  - elevation: 2,960 m (9,710 ft)
- Mouth: Ob
  - location: Khanty-Mansiysk, Russia
  - coordinates: 61°04′52″N 68°49′49″E
  - elevation: 20 m (66 ft)
- Length: 4,248 km (2,640 mi)
- Basin size: 1,643,000 km^{2} (634,000 sq mi)
- Discharge
  - average: 2,150 m^{3}/s (76,000 cu ft/s) (near Tobolsk)

Basin features
- Progression: Ob→ Kara Sea

The Irtysh (/ɜːrˈtɪʃ, ˈɪərtɪʃ/) (Note: Old Turkic: 𐰼𐱅𐰾:𐰇𐰏𐰕𐰏, romanized: Ertis ügüzüg; Mongolian: Эрчис мөрөн, romanized: Erchis mörön, pronounced [é̝rt͡ɕʰɪs mɵ́rɵɰ̃]; Altay: Эрчиш, romanized: Erchish, pronounced [e̞rc͡çí̞ɕ]; Buryat: Эрчис мүрэн, romanized: Erchis müren, pronounced [ˈert͡ɕʰɪs ˈmurɤŋ]; Russian: Иртыш, romanized: Irtyš, pronounced [ɪrˈtɨʂ]; Kazakh: Ертіс, romanized: Ertıs, arabized: ه‌رتىس, pronounced [(j)ertɪ́s]; Kyrgyz: Иртыш дарыясы, romanized: Irtysh daryiasy, arabized: ئرتىش دارىياسى, pronounced [ɪɾtʰɯ́ɕ tɑɾɯʝɑsɯ́]; Khanty: Тангат / Тлангатль, romanized: Tangat / Tlangatl; Chinese: 额尔齐斯河 / 額爾齊斯河, pinyin: É'ěrqísī hé, Cantonese: Ngaahkyíhcàihsì hòh; Dungan: Эрчисы хә, Xiao'erjing: عَعَرٿِسِ حْ; Uyghur: ئېرتىش, romanized: Ertish, cyrillized: Әртиш, pronounced [æɾtʰɪ́ɕ]; Standard Tibetan: ཨིར་ཏིཤ་ཆུ་བོ།, romanized: Irtish chubo; Tatar: Иртеш, romanized: İrteş, arabized: ايرتش, pronounced [irˈtɘ̆ʃ]; Siberian Tatar: Эйәртеш, romanized: Eyärteş, pronounced [ejærtéʃ]) is a river in Russia, China, and Kazakhstan. It is the chief tributary of the Ob and is also the longest tributary in the world.

The river's source lies in the Mongolian Altai in Dzungaria (the northern part of Xinjiang, China) close to the border with Mongolia.

The Irtysh's main tributaries include the Tobol, Demyanka and the Ishim. The Ob-Irtysh system forms a major drainage basin in Asia, encompassing most of Western Siberia and the Altai Mountains.

== Etymology ==
The name was first encountered in the epitaphs of the Second Eastern Turkic Khaganate commanders Tonyukuk (646–724) and Kul Tigin (684–731).

The first to attempt to decipher the name of the Irtysh was the Turkic philologist Mahmud al-Kashgari (1029–1101). According to his interpretation, the river got its name from the word ertishmak (Note: In the Old Turkic Dictionary the name of the river is recorded in the form Ertiš – with a reference to the dictionary of Mahmud of Kashgar (MK I) and the monument in honor of Tonyukuk (Ton).) (quick jump). At the same time, according to the legend cited by his contemporary, the Persian geographer al-Gardizi (d. 1061) in his treatise Zayn al-akhbar, the author of the name is a slave of the founder of the Kimaks, Prince Shad. Seeing the Turks wandering near the river, she said to them "irtysh", which meant "stop".

Gerhard Friedrich Müller gives a version of the formation of the name of the river from the name of the Tatar Khan Irtyshak, the successor of Khan On-Som.

According to one version, the name of the river comes from the Turkic words: ir – "earth", tysh – "dig", that is, it means "digging the earth".

According to A. P. Dulzon and V. N. Popova, in the name Irtysh the segment tysh goes back to the Ket chesh, shesh, sis, ses – "river", and the initial ir is associated with the pre-Ket (Iranian) root meaning "stormy", "rapid".

The Hungarian chronicles about the prehistory of Hungary speak of the river Togora, the same river is named in the Vienna illustrated chronicle and in Turoc-Togat. Hunfalvi sees here a Hungarian memory of the Irtysh, which, according to Matthias Castrén, is called by the Ostyaks Tangat or Tlangatl (Langal).

== Geography ==
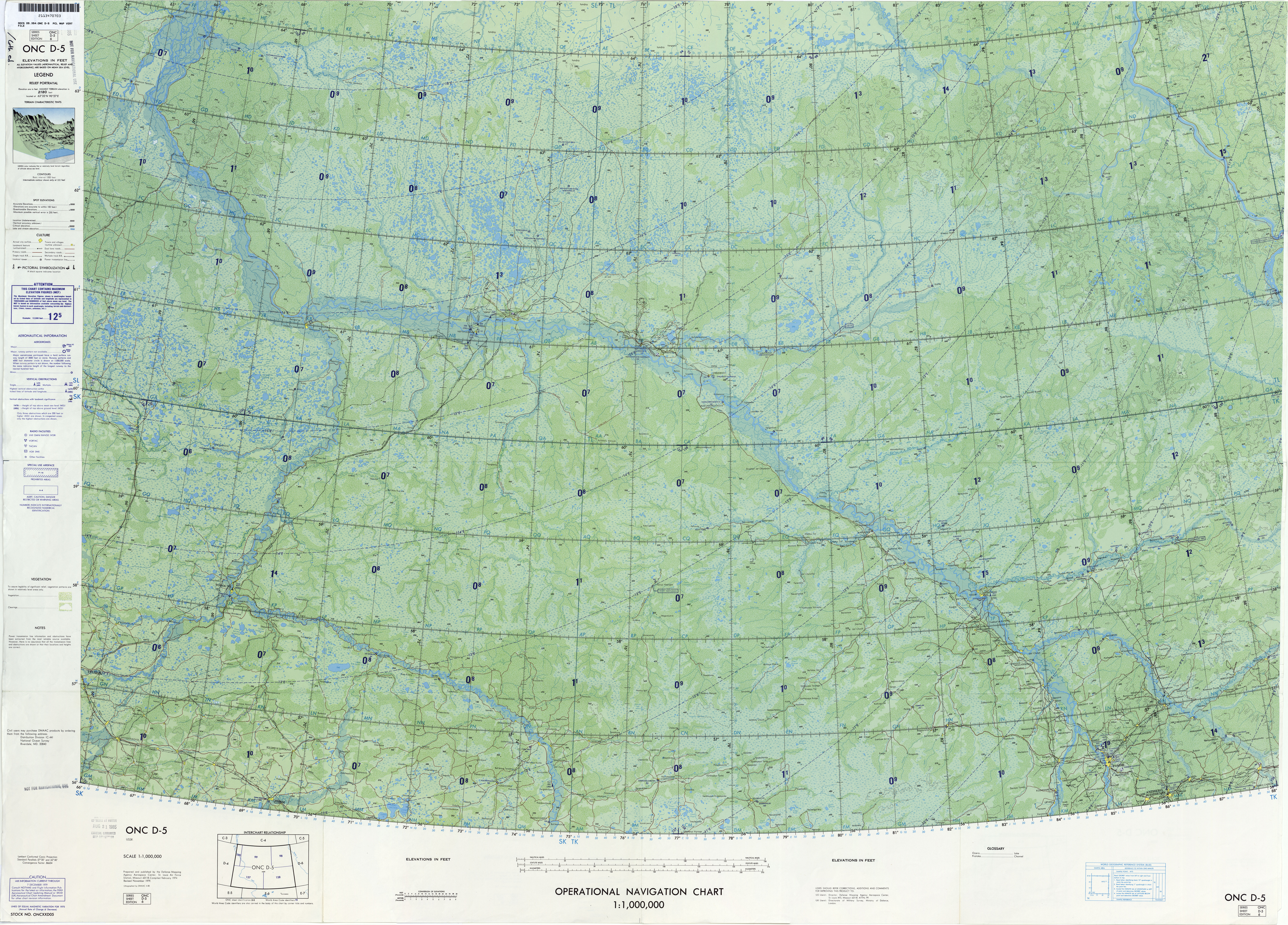
Map including the lower reaches of the Irtysh River

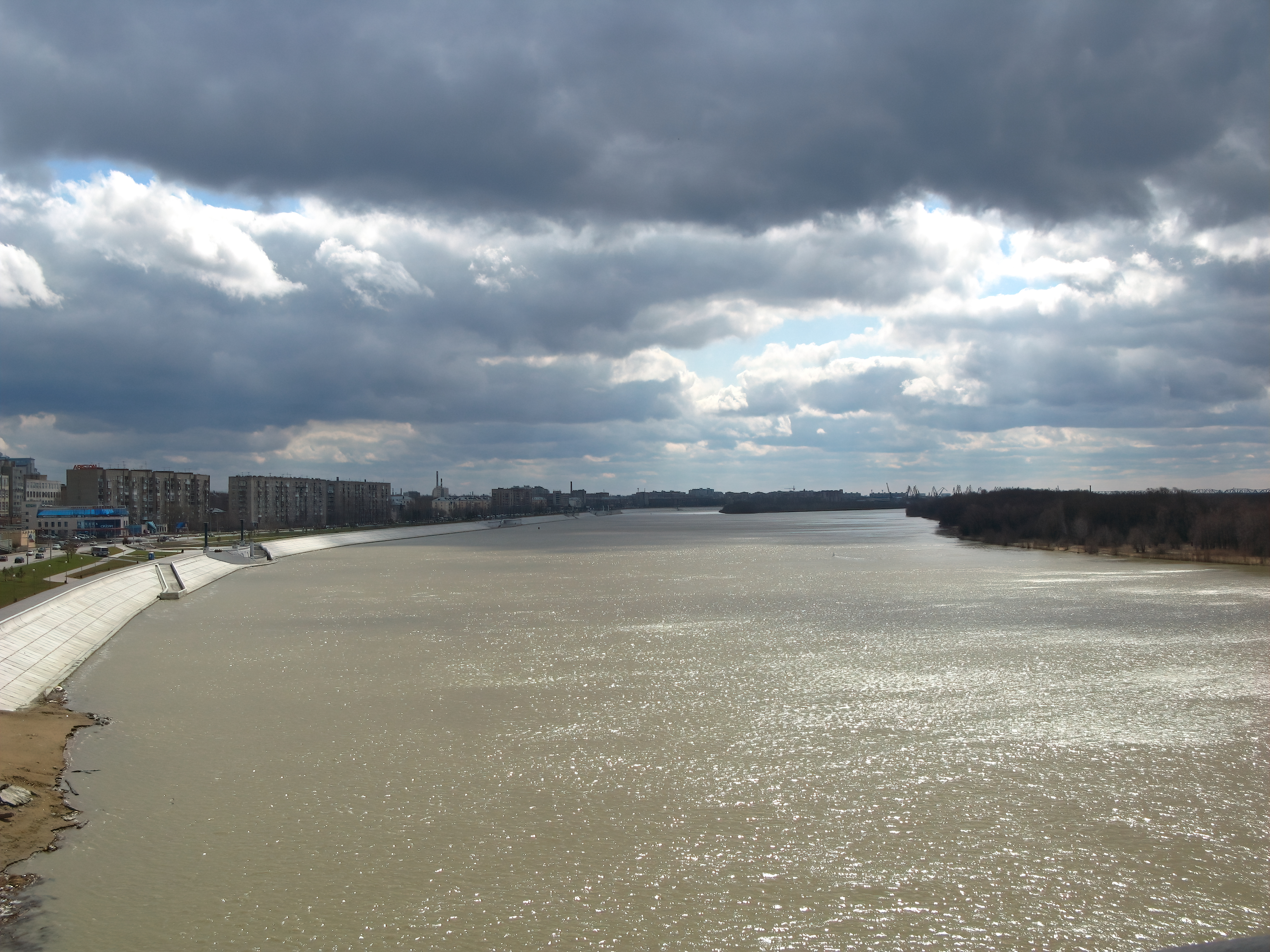
The Irtysh in Omsk

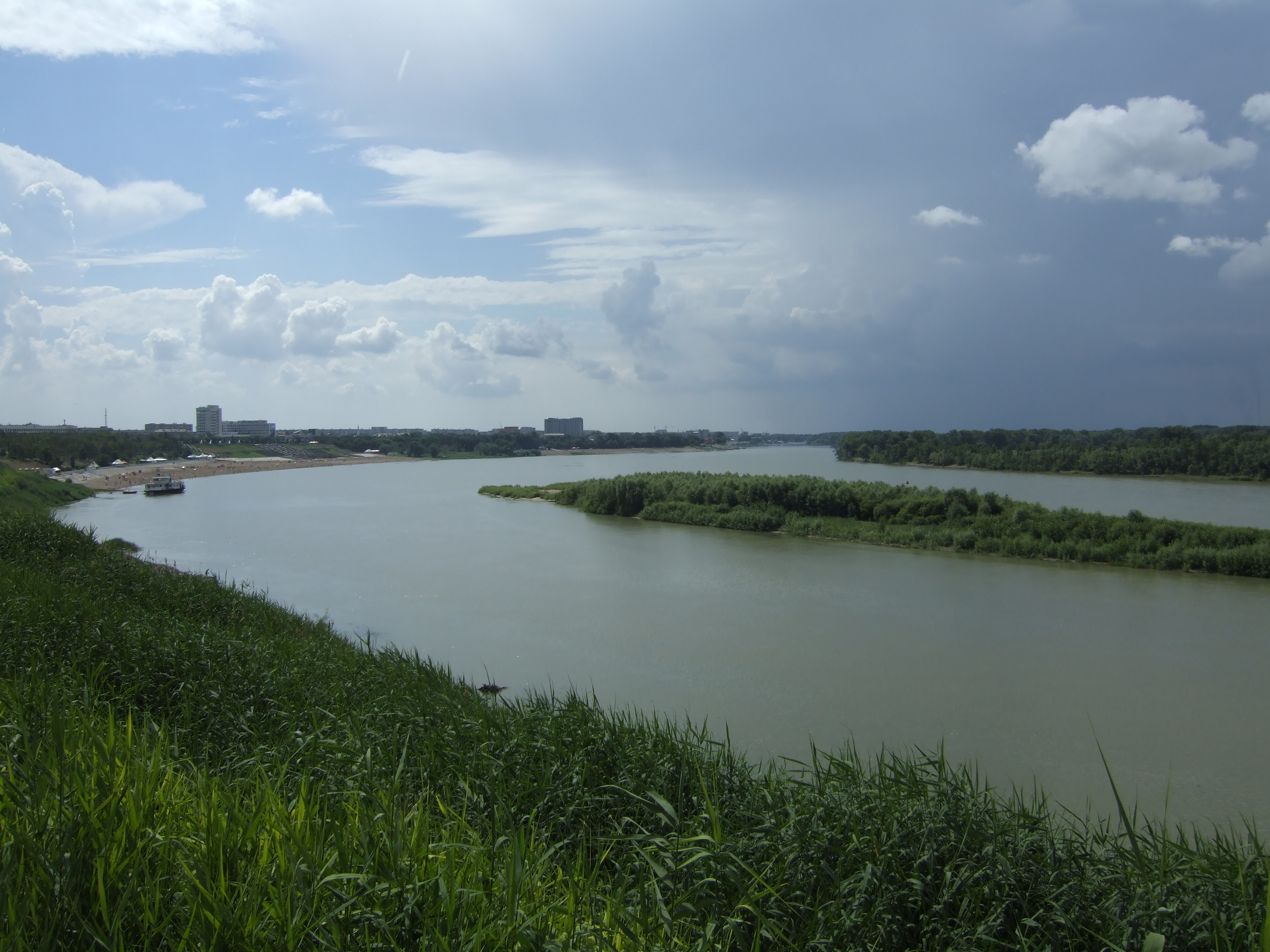
The Irtysh near Pavlodar in Kazakhstan

From its origins as the Kara-Irtysh (Black Irtysh) in the Mongolian Altay mountains in Xinjiang, China, the Irtysh flows northwest through Lake Zaysan in Kazakhstan, meeting the Ishim and Tobol rivers before merging with the Ob near Khanty-Mansiysk in western Siberia, Russia after 4,248 kilometres (2,640 mi).

The name Black Irtysh (Kara-Irtysh in Kazakh, or Cherny Irtysh in Russian) is applied by some authors, especially in Russia and Kazakhstan, to the upper course of the river, from its source entering Lake Zaysan. The term White Irtysh, in contrast to the Black Irtysh, was occasionally used in the past to refer to the Irtysh below Lake Zaysan; now this usage is largely obsolete.

=== Main tributaries ===
The largest tributaries of the Irtysh are, from source to mouth:

- Kelan (right)
- Burqin (right)
- Kalzhyr (right)
- Kürshim (right)
- Naryn (right)
- Bukhtarma (right)
- Ulba (right)
- Uba (right)
- Shar (left)
- Chagan (left)
- Om (right)
- Tara (right)
- Uy (right)
- Osha (left)
- Shish (right)
- Ishim (left)
- Tobol (left)
- Noska (left)
- Demyanka (right)
- Konda (left)

== Economic use ==
In Kazakhstan and Russia, tankers, passenger ships, and cargo vessels navigate the river during the ice-free season, between April and October. Omsk, home to the headquarters of the state-owned Irtysh River Shipping Company, functions as the largest river port in Western Siberia.

On the Kazakhstan section of the river there are presently three major hydroelectric plants, namely at Bukhtarma, Ust-Kamenogorsk and Shulbinsk. The world's deepest lock, with a drop of 42 metres (138 ft), allows river traffic to by-pass the dam at Ust-Kamenogorsk. Plans exist for the construction of several more dams.

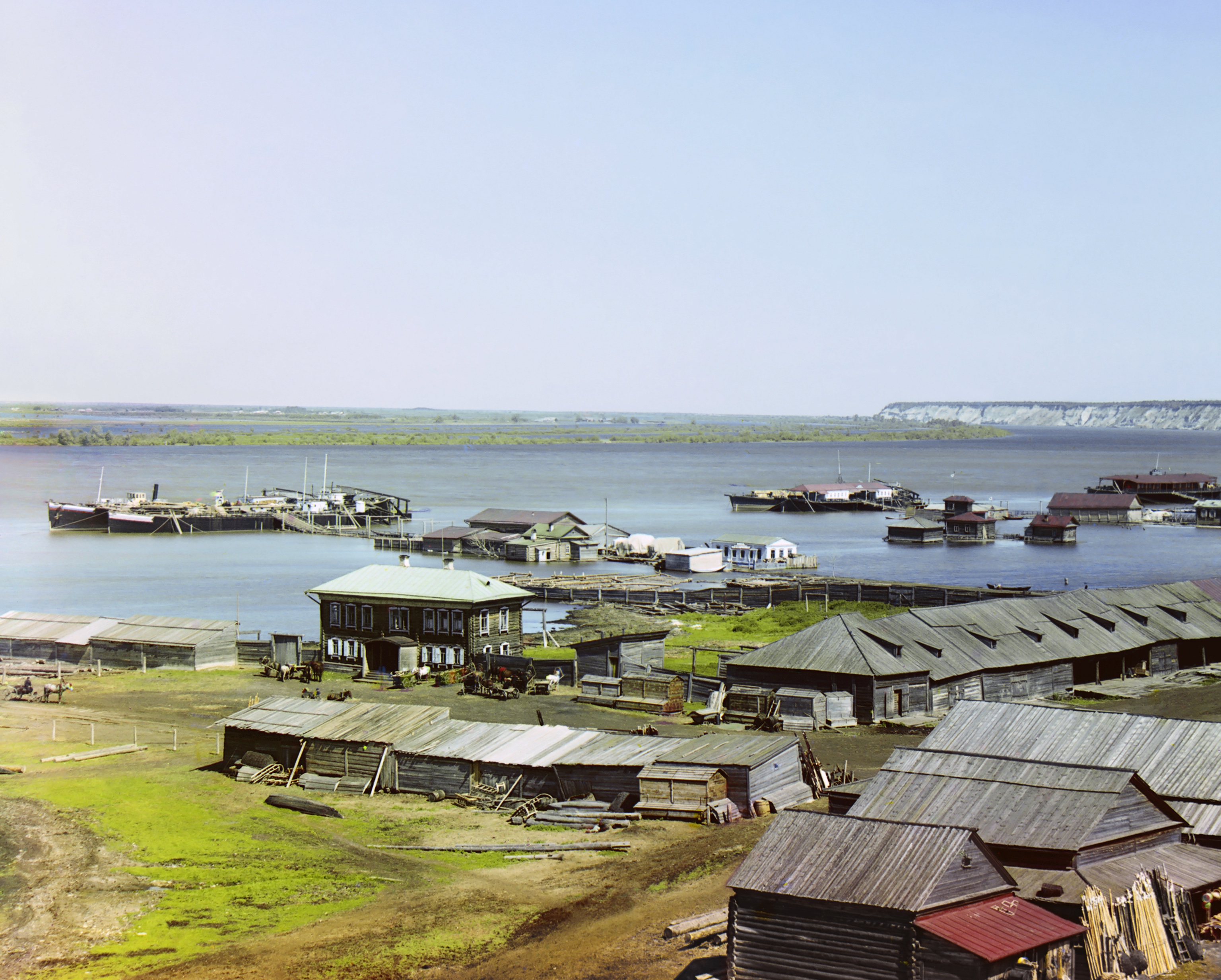
Tobolsk river wharves in 1912

Three dams have been constructed on the Chinese section of the Irtysh as well: the Keketuohai (可可托海) Dam (47°10′51″N 89°42′35″E), the Kalasuke (喀腊塑克) Dam (47°08′14″N 88°53′15″E), and the Project 635 Dam. There are also the Burqin Chonghu'er Dam and the Burqin Shankou Dam on the Irtysh's right tributary, the Burqin River and the Jilebulake Dam and Haba River Shankou Dam on another right tributary, the Haba River.

The Northern river reversal proposals, widely discussed by the USSR planners and scientists in the 1960s and 1970s, would send some of the Irtysh's (and possibly Ob's) water to the water-deficient regions of central Kazakhstan and Uzbekistan. Some versions of this project would have seen the direction of flow of the Irtysh reversed in its section between the mouth of the Tobol (at Tobolsk) and the confluence of the Irtysh with the Ob at Khanty-Mansiysk, thus creating an "Anti-Irtysh". While these gigantic interbasin transfer schemes were not implemented, a smaller Irtysh–Karaganda Canal was built between 1962 and 1974 to supply water to the dry Kazakh steppes and to one of the country's main industrial center, Karaganda. In 2002, pipelines were constructed to supply water from the canal to the Ishim river and Kazakhstan's capital, Astana.

In China, a short canal was constructed in 1987 (water intake at 47°26′31″N 87°34′11″E) to divert some of the Irtysh water to the endorheic Lake Ulungur, whose level had been falling precipitously due to the increasing irrigation use of the lake's main affluent, the Ulungur River. In the last years of the 20th century and the early 2000s, a much more major project, the Irtysh–Karamay–Urümqi Canal was completed. Increased water use in China has caused significant concerns among Kazakh and Russian environmentalists. According to a report published by Kazakhstan fishery researchers in 2013, the total Irtysh water use in China is about 3 cubic kilometres (0.7 mi^{3}) per year; as a result, only about 2/3 of what would be the river's "natural" flow (6 km^{3} out of 9 km^{3}) reaches the Kazakh border.

== Cities ==
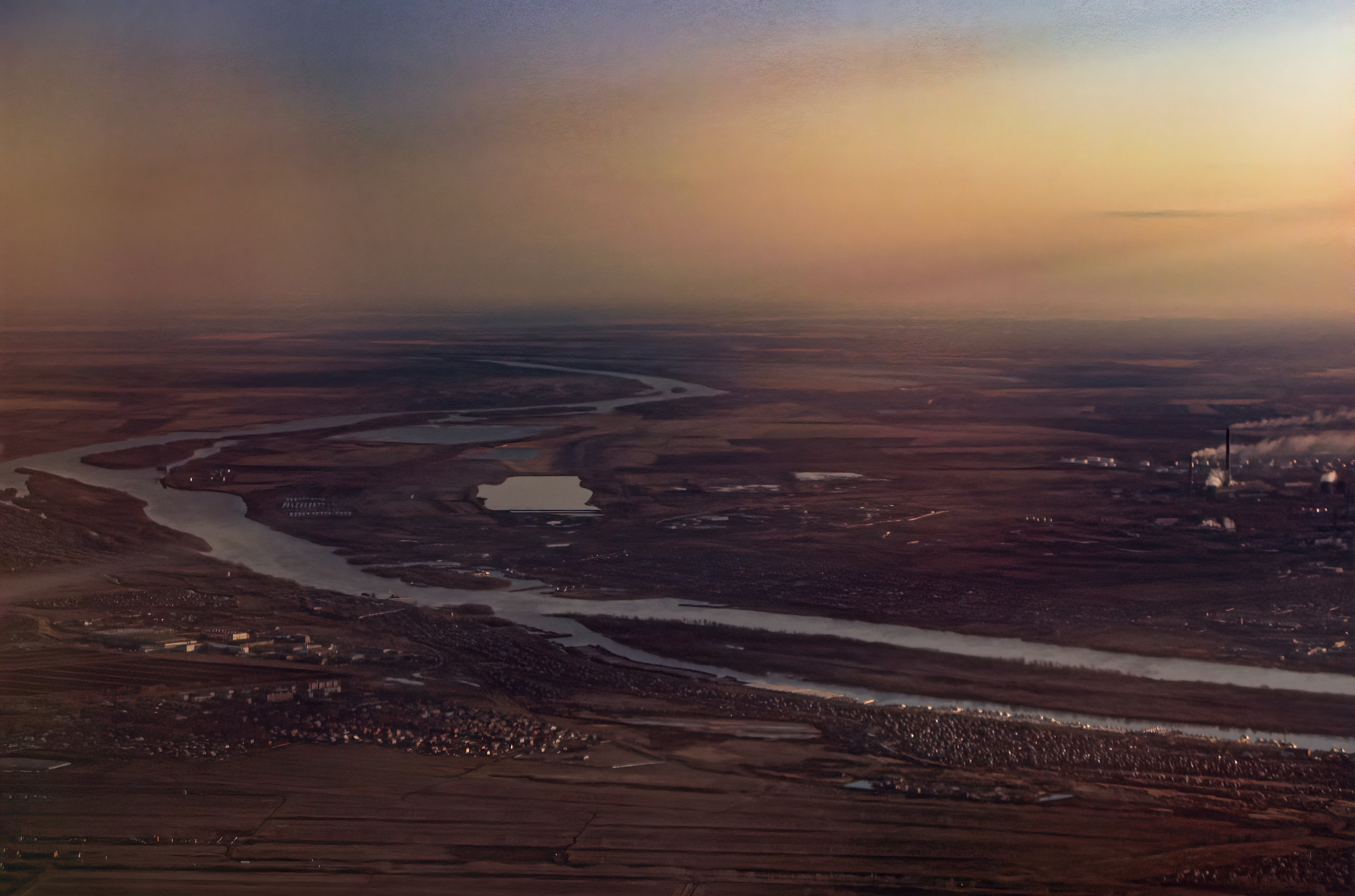
An aerial view of the Irtysh in Omsk

Major cities along the Irtysh, from source to mouth, include:

- in China: Fuyun, Beitun, Burqin
- in Kazakhstan: Oskemen, Semey, Aksu, Pavlodar
- in Russia: Omsk, Tara, Tobolsk, Khanty-Mansiysk

== Bridges ==
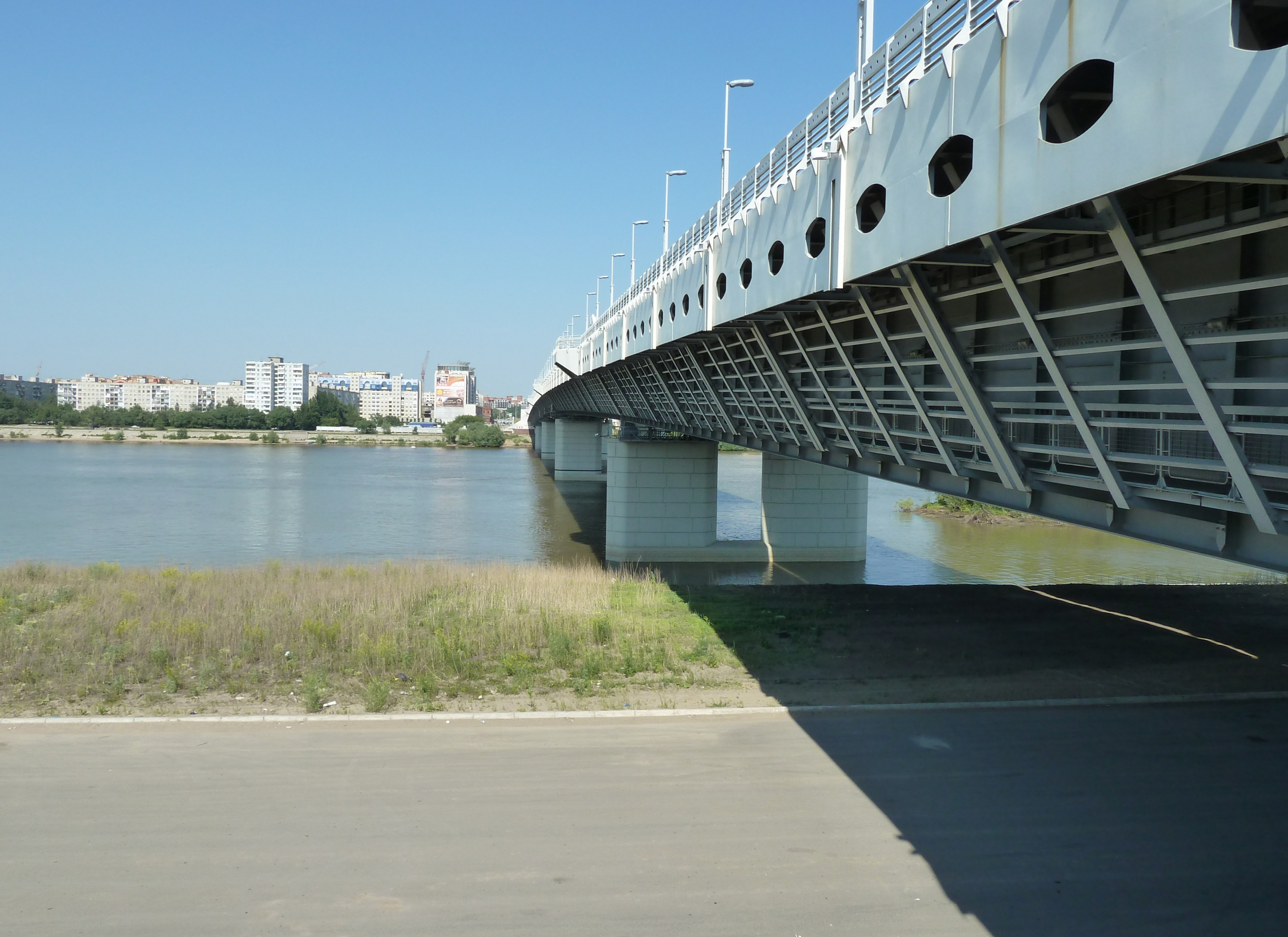
The Sixty Years of Victory Bridge in Omsk. (The name commemorates the 60th anniversary of the V-E Day)

Seven railway bridges span the Irtysh. They are located in the following cities:

- About 15 km downstream from Serebryansk (on the dead-end branch line from Oskemen to Zyryanovsk)
- Oskemen
- Semey, on the Turkestan–Siberia Railway
- Pavlodar, on the South Siberian rail line (Nur-Sultan to Barnaul)
- near Cherlak, on the Middle Siberian rail line (Среднесибирская магистраль)
- Omsk, on the Trans-Siberian Railway. Opened in 1896, this is the oldest bridge on the river.
- Tobolsk, on the Tyumen-Surgut line

As the Kuytun–Beitun Railway in China's Xinjiang is being extended toward Altay City, a railway bridge over the Irtysh at Beitun will need to be constructed as well.

Numerous highway bridges over the Irtysh exist in China, Kazakhstan, and Russia.

The last bridge downstream on the Irtysh, a highway bridge opened in 2004, is at Khanty-Mansiysk, right before the river's confluence with the Ob.

== History ==
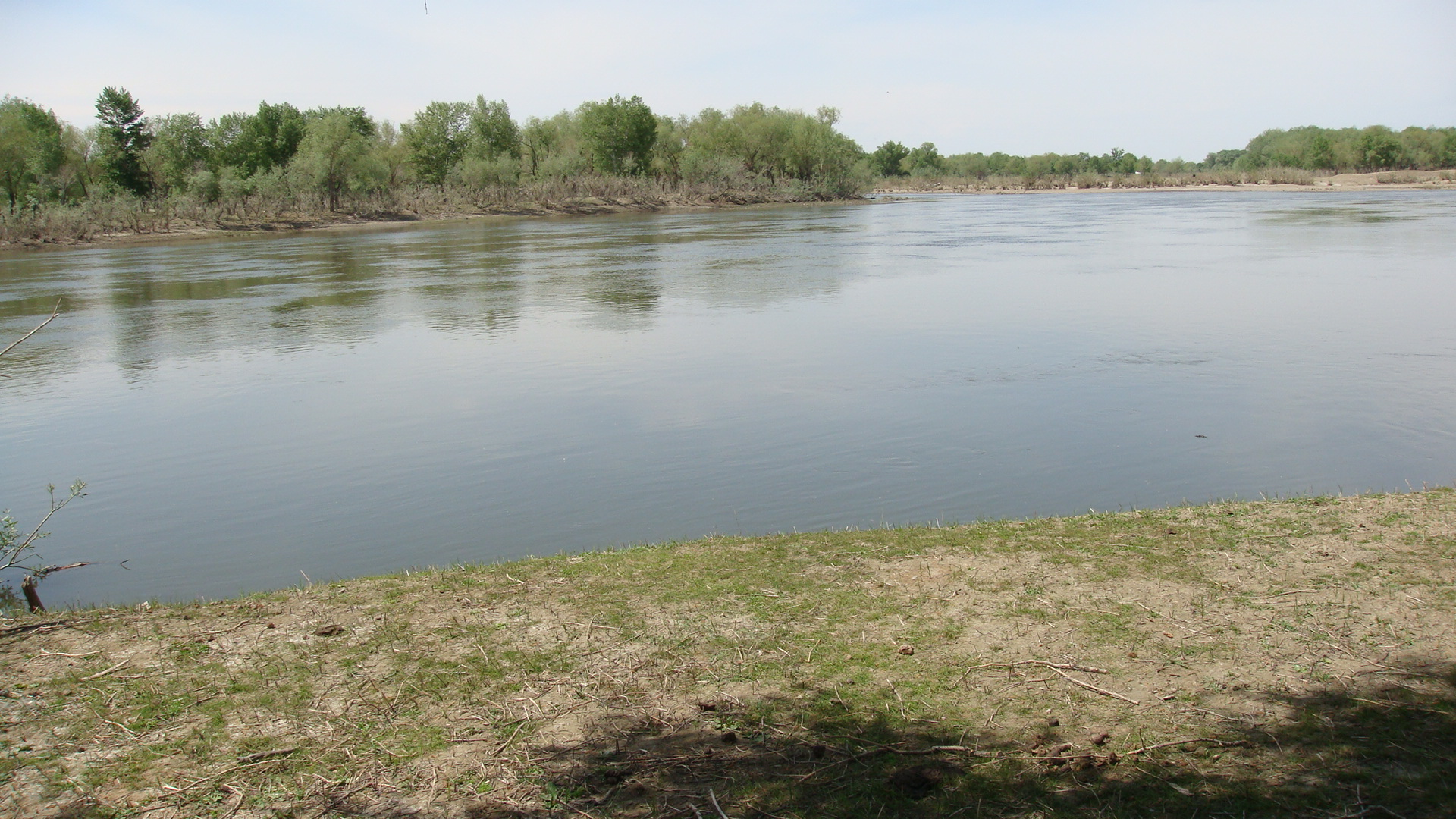
Irtysh River landscape in Burqin County, China

A number of Mongol and Turkic peoples occupied the river banks for many centuries. In 657, Tang dynasty general Su Dingfang defeated Ashina Helu, qaghan of the Western Turkic Khaganate, at the Battle of Irtysh River, ending the Tang campaign against the Western Turks. Helu's defeat ended the Khaganate, strengthened Tang control of Xinjiang, and led to Tang suzerainty over the western Turks.

The Battle of Irtysh River took place in 1208 between the Mongol Empire and an alliance of Merkit and Naimans near where Bukhtarma river becomes a tributary of the Irtysh.

In the north-east of Irtysh, there was the Yenisei Kingdom, ruled by the Melig family from the Ögedei dynasty of the Yuan dynasty, which ruled until 1361. It was destroyed by the Oirats.

In the 15th and 16th centuries the lower and middle courses of the Irtysh lay within the Tatar Khanate of Sibir; its capital, Qashliq (also known as Sibir) was located on the Irtysh a few kilometres upstream from the mouth of the Tobol (where today's Tobolsk is situated).

The Khanate of Sibir was conquered by the Russians in the 1580s. The Russians started building fortresses and towns next to the sites of former Tatar towns; one of the first Russian towns in Siberia (after Tyumen) was Tobolsk, founded in 1587 at the fall of the Tobol into the Irtysh, downstream from the former Qashliq. Farther east, Tara was founded in 1594, roughly at the border of the taiga belt (to the north) and the steppe to the south.

In the 17th century the Dzungar Khanate, formed by the Mongol Oirat people, became Russia's southern neighbor, and controlled the upper Irtysh. As a result of Russia's confrontation with the Dzungars in the Peter the Great's era, the Russians founded the cities of Omsk in 1716, Semipalatinsk in 1718, Ust-Kamenogorsk in 1720, and Petropavlovsk in 1752.

The Chinese Qing Empire conquered Dzungaria in the 1750s. This prompted an increase in the Russian authorities' attention to their borderland; in 1756, the Orenburg Governor Ivan Neplyuyev even proposed the annexation of the Lake Zaysan region, but this project was forestalled by Chinese successes. Concerns were raised in Russia (1759) about the (theoretical) possibility of a Chinese fleet sailing from Lake Zaysan down the Irtysh and into Western Siberia. A Russian expedition visited Lake Zaysan in 1764, and concluded that such a riverine invasion would not be likely. Nonetheless, a chain of Russian pickets was established on the Bukhtarma River, north of Lake Zaysan. Thus the border between the two empires in the Irtysh basin became roughly delineated, with a (sparse) chain of guard posts on both sides. In the summer of 1828, the Prussian explorer Alexander von Humboldt visited the Irtysh region on his journey through Russia and Central Asia; he came face-to-face with Chinese and Mongol border guards.

The situation in the borderlands in the mid-19th century is described in a report by A. Abramof (ru; 1865). Even though the Zaysan region was recognized by both parties as part of the Qing empire, it had been annually used, by fishing expeditions sent by the Siberian Cossack Host. The summer expeditions started in 1803, and in 1822–25 their range was expanded through the entire Lake Zaysan and to the mouth of the Black Irtysh. Through the mid-19th century, the Qing presence on the upper Irtysh was mostly limited to the annual visit of the Qing amban from Chuguchak to one of the Cossacks' fishing stations (Batavski Piket).

The border between the Russian and the Qing empires in the Irtysh basin was established along the line fairly similar to China's modern border with Russia and Kazakhstan by the Convention of Peking of 1860. The actual border line pursuant to the convention was drawn by the Protocol of Chuguchak (1864), leaving Lake Zaysan on the Russian side. The Qing empire's military presence in the Irtysh basin crumbled during the 1862–77 Dungan Revolt. After the fall of the rebellion and the reconquest of Xinjiang by Zuo Zongtang, the border between the Russian and the Qing empires in the Irtysh basin was further slightly readjusted, in Russia's favor, by the Treaty of Saint Petersburg (1881).

== Cultural references ==
The Irtysh River serves as a backdrop in the epilogue of Fyodor Dostoyevsky's 1866 novel Crime and Punishment. In Aleksandr Solzhenitsyn's The Gulag Archipelago, the chapter "The White Kitten" details Georgi Tenno's escape from a camp along this river.

== Other uses ==
- FC Irtysh Omsk, a soccer team in Omsk, Russia.
- FC Irtysh Pavlodar, a soccer team in Pavlodar, Kazakhstan.
- Irtysh (Иртыш), a Russian military hospital ship, used at the Bering Strait Swim 2013.

== See also ==
- Geography of China
- Geography of Kazakhstan
- Geography of Russia

== General literature ==
- Great Soviet Encyclopedia
- Abramof, A. (1865), "The lake Nor-Zaysan and its neighborhood", Journal of the Royal Geographical Society of London, 35, translated by John Michell: 58–69, doi:10.2307/3698078, JSTOR 3698078
