= Jilebulake Dam =

- Location within China
- Country: China
- Location: Habahe County
- Coordinates: 48°15′51.96″N 86°23′55.72″E
- Purpose: Power
- Status: Operational
- Construction began: 2009
- Opening date: 2013; 13 years ago

Dam and spillways
- Type of dam: Embankment, concrete-face rock-fill
- Impounds: Haba River
- Height: 146.30 m (480.0 ft)
- Length: 464 m (1,522 ft)
- Width (crest): 10 m (33 ft)

Reservoir
- Total capacity: 232,000,000 m^{3} (188,000 acre⋅ft)
- Surface area: 5.15 km^{2} (1.99 mi^{2})

Power Station
- Commission date: 2014
- Turbines: 2 x 50 MW, 2 x 30 MW Francis-type
- Installed capacity: 160 MW

The Jilebulake Dam (Chinese: 吉勒布拉克水坝) is a concrete-face rock-fill dam on the Haba River, a tributary of the Irtysh, in Habahe County of the Xinjiang Uyghur Autonomous Region in China. The primary purpose of the dam is hydroelectric power generation and it supports a 160 MW power station. Construction on the 146.30 m (480.0 ft) tall dam began in 2009 and its reservoir began to fill in November 2013. During filling, on November 17, the diversion tunnel gate failed and the water inside the reservoir rushed downstream. Locals downstream were evacuated and there was no loss of life. The Shankou Dam just downstream was able to control much of the flooding.

== See also ==
- List of dams and reservoirs in China
- List of tallest dams in the world
- List of tallest dams in China
