= Cherlak =

Cherlak (Russian: Черлак) is the name of several inhabited localities in Russia.

Urban localities

- Cherlak, Cherlaksky District, Omsk Oblast, a work settlement in Cherlaksky District of Omsk Oblast

Rural localities

- Cherlak, Republic of Bashkortostan, a selo in Cherlakovsky Selsoviet of Dyurtyulinsky District of the Republic of Bashkortostan
- Cherlak, Tatarsky Rural Okrug, Cherlaksky District, Omsk Oblast, a station in Tatarsky Rural Okrug of Cherlaksky District of Omsk Oblast
- Cherlak, Sverdlovsk Oblast, a village in Krasnoufimsky District of Sverdlovsk Oblast
