= Yamaguchi =

Yamaguchi may refer to:

== People ==
- Yamaguchi (surname), the 14th most popular Japanese surname, including a list of people.

== Places ==
- Yamaguchi Prefecture, the westernmost prefecture of Honshū island of Japan
  - Yamaguchi (city), capital of Yamaguchi Prefecture
    - Yamaguchi Station (Yamaguchi), a JR West railway station, located in the center of Yamaguchi-shi
    - Shin-Yamaguchi Station, a railway station in Yamaguchi-shi (Sanyō Shinkansen line)
- Yamaguchi, Nagano, a village in Nagano Prefecture

== Fiction ==
- Kumiko "Yankumi" Yamaguchi, the character played by Yukie Nakama in Gokusen, a Japanese TV show
- Yamaguchi-sensei, a doctor in the manga/anime series Fighting Spirit
- U.S.S. Yamaguchi, an Ambassador-class Federation starship in the Star Trek franchise
- Yamaguchi Digital Pets, a fictional digital pets company mentioned in Fanboy & Chum Chum
- Yamaguchi Tadashi, a member of the Karasuno volleyball club in the manga/anime series Haikyu!!

== Other uses ==
- Yamaguchi-gumi, a yakuza group
- 15841 Yamaguchi, an asteroid named for the Japanese prefecture
- Sweden v. Yamaguchi
- Yamaguchi esterification, a chemical reaction
- Shankou (disambiguation), the Chinese equivalent
