= Shish (river) =

River in Russia

Physical characteristics
- Mouth: Irtysh
  - coordinates: 57°19′03″N 73°22′43″E
- Length: 530 km (330 mi)
- Basin size: 21,300 km^{2} (8,200 sq mi)

Basin features
- Progression: Irtysh→ Ob→ Kara Sea

The Shish (Russian: Шиш) is a river in the Omsk Oblast of Russia. It is a right tributary of the Irtysh. It is 378 km long with a basin area of 5,270 km². The Shish usually freezes by early November and the ice breaks up by the end of April.
