= Burqin Kanas Airport =

Airport in Xinjiang, China

Burqin Kanas Airport 布尔津喀纳斯机场 بۋىرشىن قاناس اۋەجايى بۇرچىن قاناس ئايرودرومى
- IATA: KJI; ICAO: ZWKN

Summary
- Airport type: Public
- Location: Burqin, Xinjiang, China
- Opened: 15 August 2007; 18 years ago
- Elevation AMSL: 1,188 m / 3,898 ft
- Coordinates: 48°13′16″N 86°59′53″E

Map
- Location of airport in Xinjiang

Runways
Direction	Length		Surface
Direction	m	ft	Surface
12/30	2,500	8,202	Concrete

Statistics (2021)
- Passengers: 55,252
- Aircraft movements: 1,921
- Cargo (metric tons): 0.6

Burqin Kanas Airport
- Simplified Chinese: 布尔津喀纳斯机场
- Traditional Chinese: 布爾津喀納斯機場
Transcriptions
Standard Mandarin
- Hanyu Pinyin: Bù'ěrjīn Kānàsī Jīchǎng

Bu'erjin Kanasi Airport (Burqin Kanas Airport) (IATA: KJI, ICAO: ZWKN) is an airport that serves Burqin County and the nearby tourist destination Kanas Lake in Xinjiang, China. It is located 50 kilometers south of the lake in Burqin County. The airport was constructed in 2006 and opened on 15 August 2007. Until 2019, the airport was only open for flights in the summer.

In September 2020, Urumqi Air started flying to Kanas Airport using a Boeing 737-800 with a Kanas lake themed livery and interior.

== Airlines and destinations ==
Airlines	Destinations
China Express Airlines	Kashgar
China Southern Airlines	Ürümqi

== See also ==
- List of airports in the People's Republic of China
