= Burqin County =

Burqin County 布尔津县 (Chinese) بۇرچىن ناھىيىسى (Uyghur) بۋىرشىن اۋدانى (Kazakh) ᠪᠤᠷᠵᠢᠨ ᠰᠢᠶᠠᠨ (Mongolian) Burchun
- County
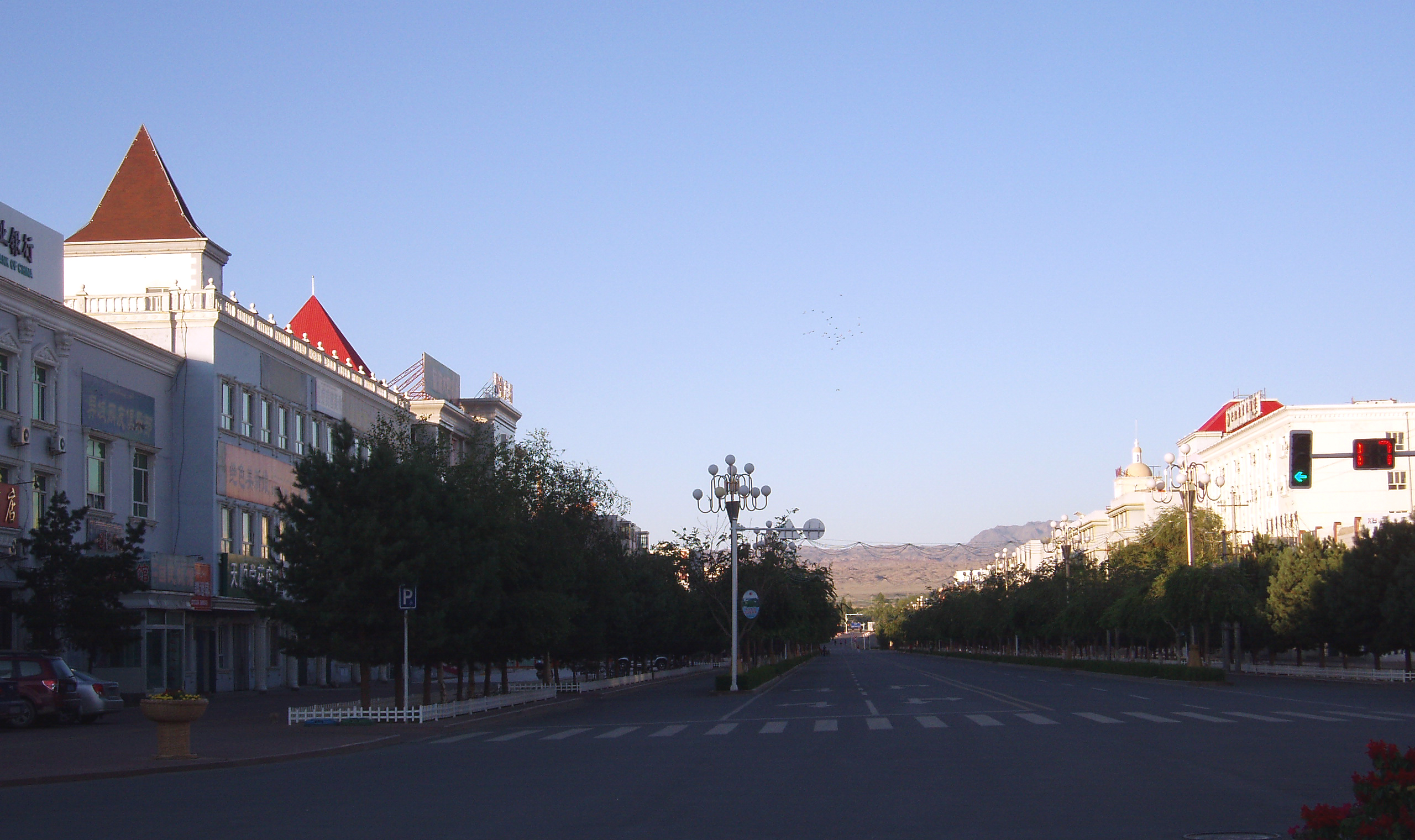

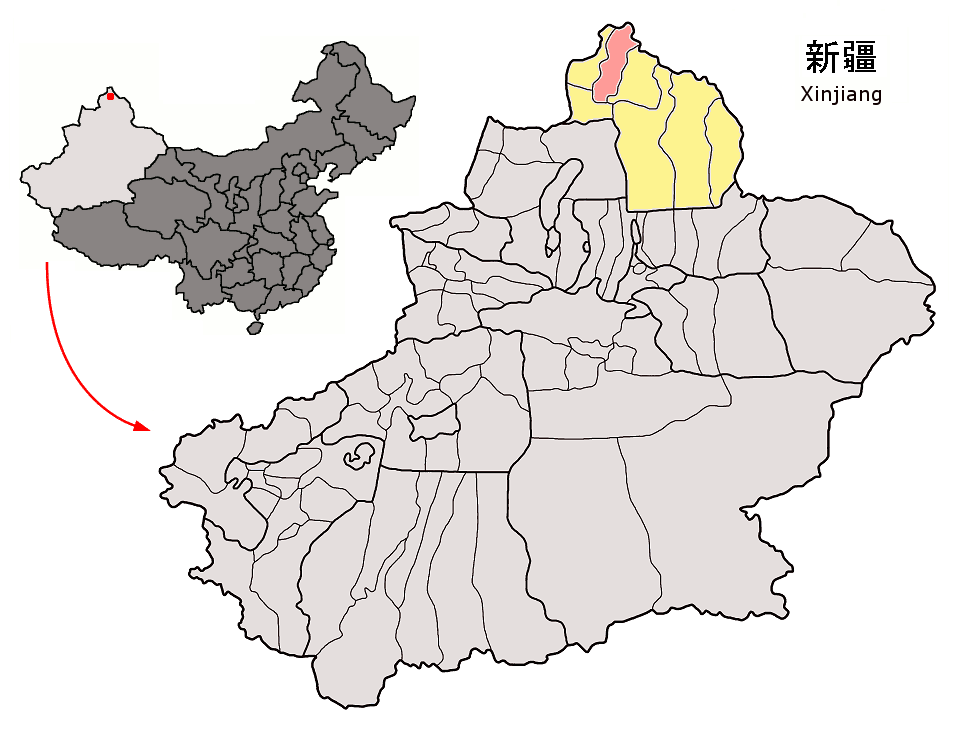
- Location of Burqin County (red) in Altay Prefecture (yellow) and Xinjiang

- Location of the county town in Xinjiang Burqin (Xinjiang) Burqin (China)
- Coordinates: 48°23′N 86°53′E
- Country: China
- Autonomous region: Xinjiang
- Prefecture: Altay
- County seat: Burqin Town

Area
  - Total: 10,344.99 km^{2} (3,994.22 sq mi)

Population (2020)
  - Total: 72,894
  - Density: 7.0463/km^{2} (18.250/sq mi)
- Time zone: UTC+8 (China Standard (Note: Locals in Xinjiang frequently observe UTC+6 (Xinjiang Time), 2 hours behind Beijing.))
- Website: www.brj.gov.cn

Burqin County

Chinese name
- Simplified Chinese: 布尔津县
- Traditional Chinese: 布爾津縣
Transcriptions
Standard Mandarin
- Hanyu Pinyin: Bù'ěrjīn Xiàn

Mongolian name
- Mongolian Cyrillic: Боржин шянь
- Mongolian script: ᠪᠤᠷᠵᠢᠨ ᠰᠢᠶᠠᠨ
Transcriptions
- SASM/GNC: burǰin siyan

Uyghur name
- Uyghur: بۇرچىن ناھىيىسى
Transcriptions
- Latin Yëziqi: Burchin nahiyisi
- Yengi Yeziⱪ: Burqin naⱨiyisi
- SASM/GNC: Burqin nahiyisi
- Siril Yëziqi: Бурчин наһийиси

Kazakh name
- Kazakh: بۋىرشىن اۋدانى; Býyrshyn aýdany Буыршын Ауданы

Burqin County is a county in Xinjiang, China and is under the administration of the Kazakh autonomous area of Altay Prefecture. It has an area of 10,362 km^{2} (4,001 sq mi) with a population of 70,000. The postcode is 836600.

== Administrative divisions ==
Burqin County is divided into 4 towns, 2 townships, and 1 ethnic township.

Name	Simplified Chinese	Hanyu Pinyin	Uyghur (UEY)	Uyghur Latin (ULY)	Kazakh (Arabic script)	Kazakh (Cyrillic script)	Administrative division code	Notes
Towns
Burqin Town	布尔津镇	Bù'ěrjīn Zhèn	بۇرچىن بازىرى	burchin baziri	بۋىرشىن قالاشىعى	Буыршын қалашығы	654321100	
Chunkur Town (Chonghur)	冲乎尔镇	Chōnghū'ěr Zhèn	چوڭقۇر بازىرى	chongqur baziri	شۇڭقىر قالاشىعى	Шұңқыр қалашығы	654321101	
Oymak Town	窝依莫克镇	Wōyīmòkè Zhèn	ئويماق بازىرى	Oymaq baziri	ويماقى قالاشىعى	Оймақы қалашығы	654321102	
Kostik Town	阔斯特克镇	Kuòsītèkè Zhèn	قوستىق بازىرى	qostiq baziri	قوستىق قالاشىعى	Қостық қалашығы	654321103	
Townships
Dolayti Township	杜来提乡	Dùláití Xiāng	دۇۋلايتى يېزىسى	duwlayti yëzisi	دۋلايتى اۋىلى	Дулайты ауылы	654321201	
Egiztobe Township	也格孜托别乡	Yěgézītuōbié Xiāng	ئېگىزتۆپە يېزىسى	Ëgiztöpe yëzisi	ەگىزتوبە اۋىلى	Егізтөбе ауылы	654321204	
Ethnic township
Kom-Kanas Mongolian Ethnic Township	禾木哈纳斯蒙古族乡	Hémùhānàsī Ménggǔzú Xiāng	قۇمقاناس موڭغۇل يېزىسى	qumqanas mongghul yëzisi	قومقاناس موڭعۇل ۇلتتىق اۋىلى	Қомқанас Моңғұл Ұлттық ауылы	654321205	(Mongolian) ᠬᠣᠮ ᠬᠠᠨᠠᠰ ᠮᠣᠩᠭᠣᠯ ᠦᠨᠳᠦᠰᠦᠲᠡᠨ ᠦ ᠰᠢᠶᠠᠩ; Хом ханаас монгол үндэстэний шиян

== Demographics ==
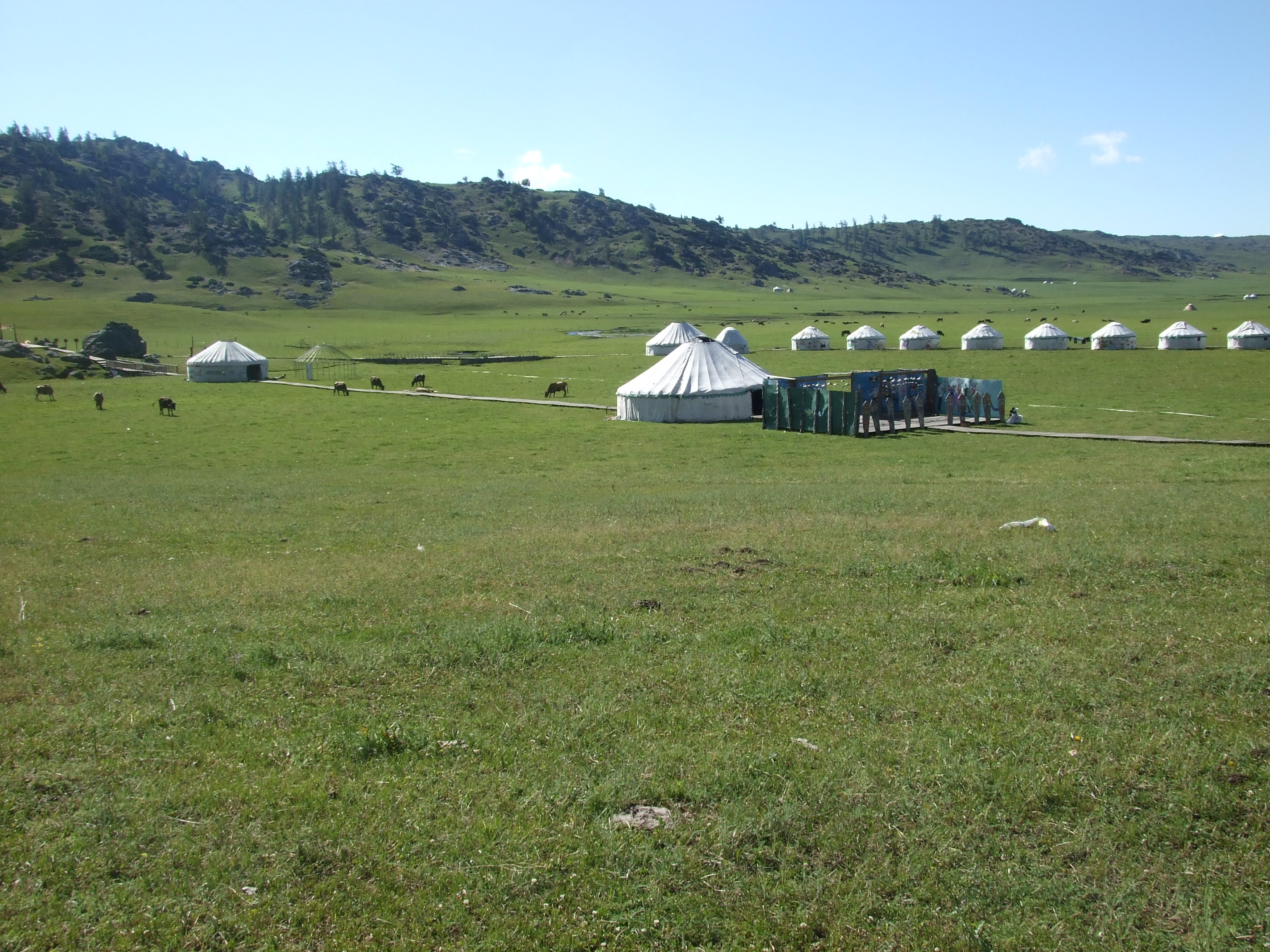
Yurts in Burqin County

The proportion of nationalities in Shanshan (Pichan) County
Nationality	Percentage
Kazakhs	57.8%
Han People	29.1%
Hui People	6.7%
Mongols	2.5%
Uyghurs	1.4%
Others	2.5%
Source of the population statistics :

== Geography ==
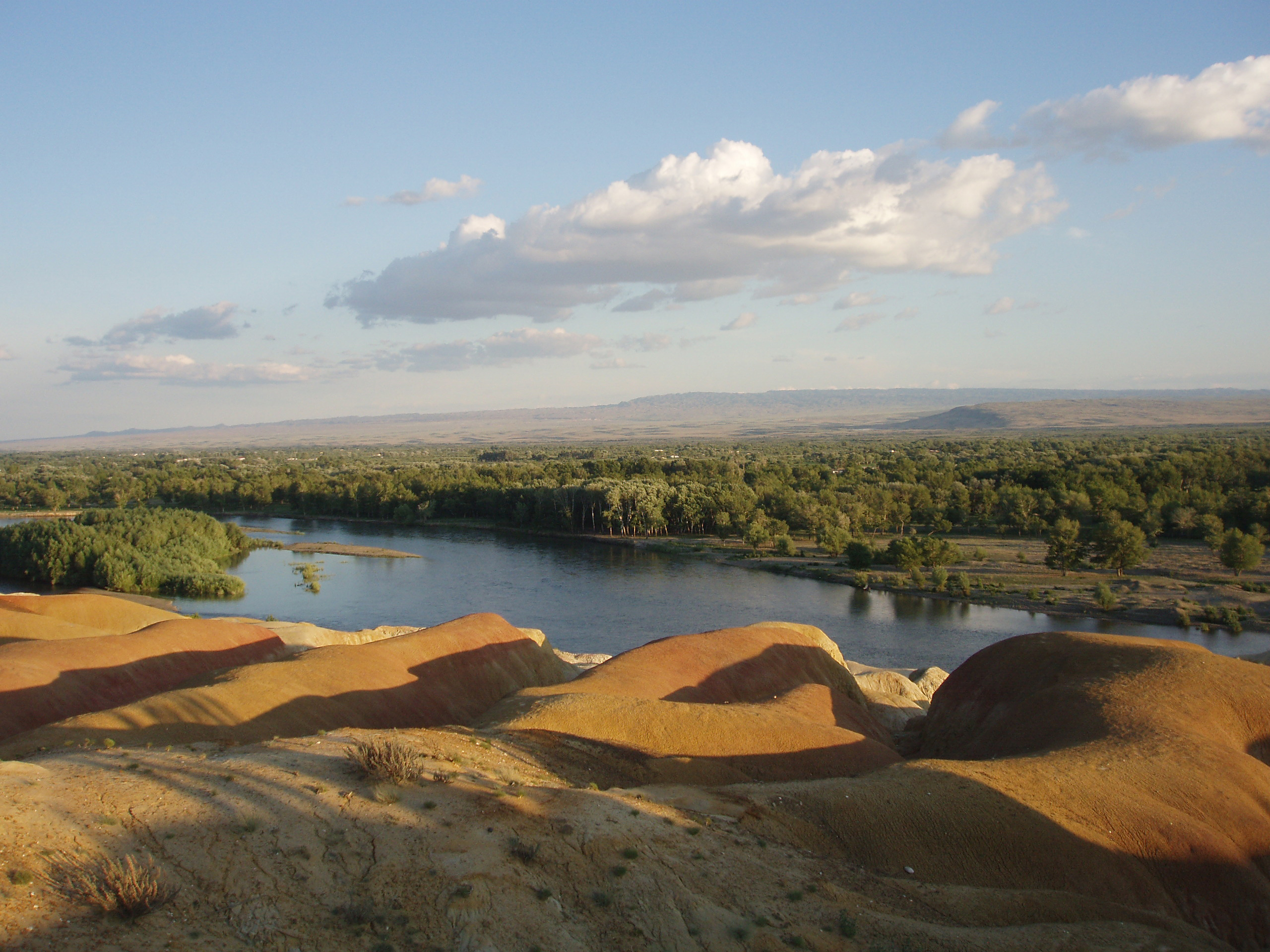
The "Colourful Beach", a famous scenic spot on the Irtysh River in Burqin County

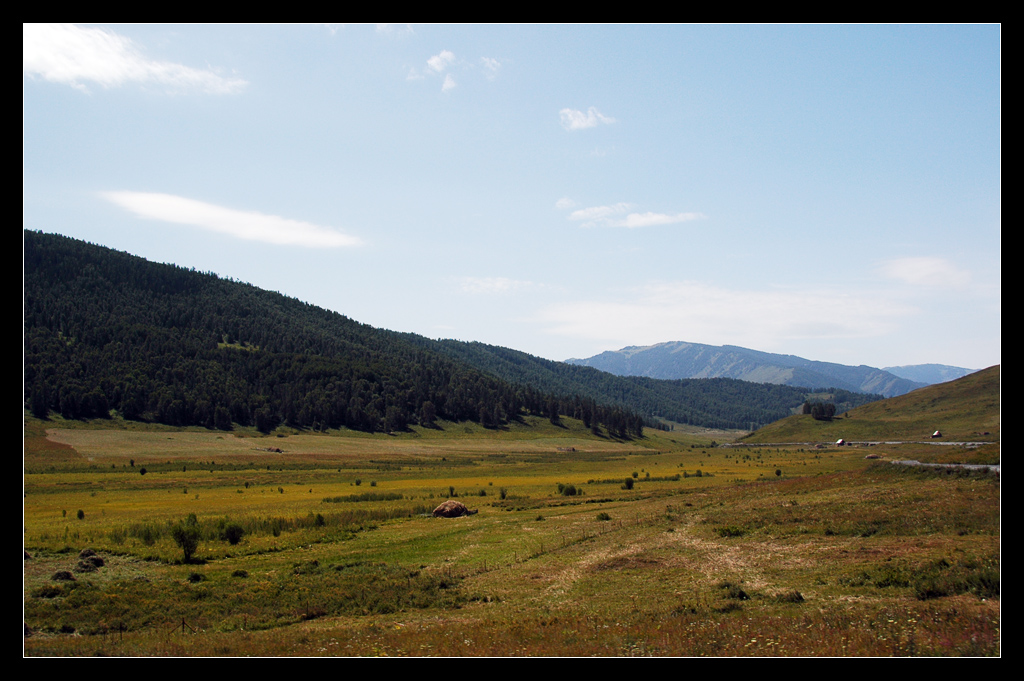
Landscape of Burqin County

Burqin County is located in the northernmost part of Xinjiang. Its county seat, which is called Burqin Town (布尔津镇) is situated at the confluence of the Irtysh and its right tributary, the Burqin River. Most of the county is within the Burqin River basin, which reaches into the Altai Mountains on Xinjiang's border with Mongolia and Russia. The major mountain massif on Burqin county's border with these two countries is Tavan Bogd.

The Kanas Lake is located in the northern part of the county, on the border with the Habahe County.

The Burqin Shankou Dam is a hydroelectric dam located on the Burqin River at 47°54′13″N 87°12′15″E. It has a 94m high concrete arch dam; the dam's hydroelectric plant generates 220 Megawatt of power. The construction work started in July 2009, with an expected completion date of June 2013; construction was completed in 2014 and the dam started generating power in November 2015.

Farther upstream on the Burqin, the Burqin Chonghu'er Dam operates in the town of Chunkur, at 48°11′00″N 87°09′08″E .

== Climate ==
Climate data for Burqin, elevation 474 m (1,555 ft), (1991–2020 normals, extremes 1981–2010)
Month	Jan	Feb	Mar	Apr	May	Jun	Jul	Aug	Sep	Oct	Nov	Dec	Year
Record high °C (°F)	3.0 (37.4)	4.7 (40.5)	23.9 (75.0)	31.2 (88.2)	35.6 (96.1)	36.9 (98.4)	39.2 (102.6)	39.4 (102.9)	34.2 (93.6)	27.1 (80.8)	15.7 (60.3)	4.9 (40.8)	39.4 (102.9)
Mean daily maximum °C (°F)	−11.9 (10.6)	−7.3 (18.9)	3.2 (37.8)	16.9 (62.4)	23.5 (74.3)	28.5 (83.3)	29.8 (85.6)	28.3 (82.9)	22.0 (71.6)	13.3 (55.9)	1.3 (34.3)	−8.7 (16.3)	11.6 (52.8)
Daily mean °C (°F)	−16.4 (2.5)	−12.5 (9.5)	−2.7 (27.1)	9.5 (49.1)	16.3 (61.3)	21.6 (70.9)	23.0 (73.4)	20.7 (69.3)	14.2 (57.6)	6.5 (43.7)	−3.3 (26.1)	−12.5 (9.5)	5.4 (41.7)
Mean daily minimum °C (°F)	−20.3 (−4.5)	−17.0 (1.4)	−7.7 (18.1)	3.0 (37.4)	9.1 (48.4)	14.4 (57.9)	16.2 (61.2)	13.7 (56.7)	7.6 (45.7)	1.3 (34.3)	−6.9 (19.6)	−15.9 (3.4)	−0.2 (31.6)
Record low °C (°F)	−41.1 (−42.0)	−34.5 (−30.1)	−30.7 (−23.3)	−16.0 (3.2)	−1.9 (28.6)	4.5 (40.1)	8.3 (46.9)	1.6 (34.9)	−3.3 (26.1)	−17.8 (0.0)	−35.0 (−31.0)	−37.5 (−35.5)	−41.1 (−42.0)
Average precipitation mm (inches)	10.2 (0.40)	7.4 (0.29)	9.7 (0.38)	12.6 (0.50)	14.6 (0.57)	16.8 (0.66)	21.3 (0.84)	16.7 (0.66)	11.4 (0.45)	13.2 (0.52)	18.0 (0.71)	12.5 (0.49)	164.4 (6.47)
Average precipitation days (≥ 0.1 mm)	7.5	7.4	5.7	6.1	6.6	6.5	8.0	6.7	5.7	5.6	8.8	9.7	84.3
Average snowy days	9.9	10.7	7.2	1.7	0.2	0	0	0	0	2	10.4	13.5	55.6
Average relative humidity (%)	76	75	70	50	46	50	57	58	58	63	74	77	63
Mean monthly sunshine hours	134.9	159.0	229.0	268.2	321.7	322.3	321.9	311.0	260.9	202.3	123.8	104.4	2,759.4
Percentage possible sunshine	48	54	61	65	68	68	68	72	71	62	46	40	60
Source: China Meteorological Administration

== Transport ==
- China National Highway 217
- Bu'erjin Kanasi Airport
