= Habahe County =

Habahe County 哈巴河县 (Chinese) قابا ناھىيىسى (Uyghur) قابا اۋدانى (Kazakh) Kaba, Khabakhe
- County
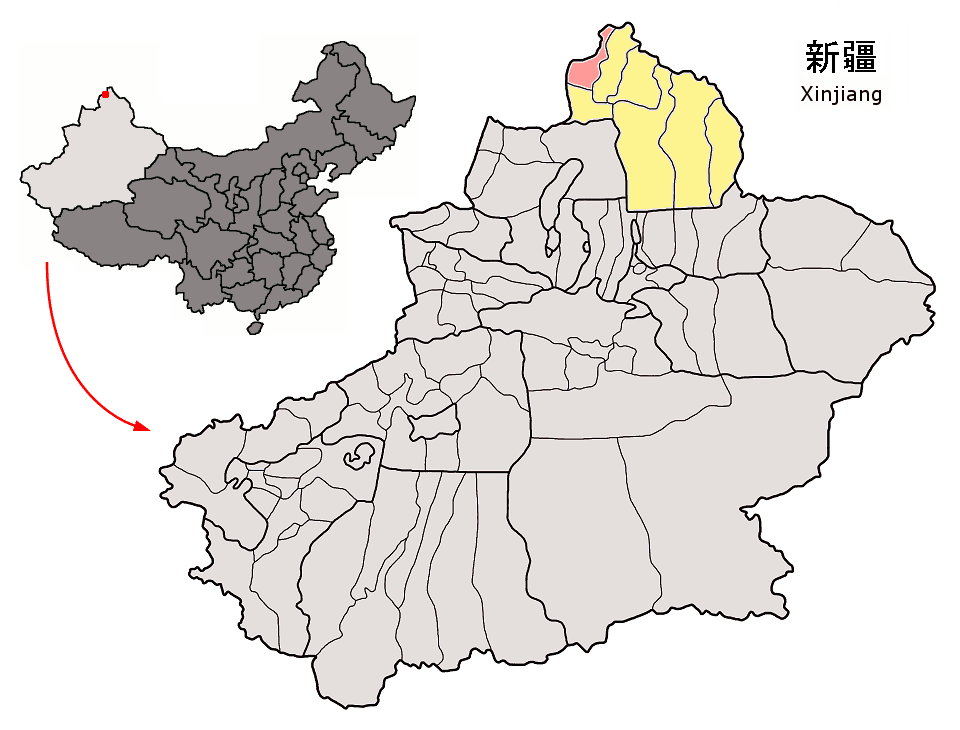
- Location of Habahe County (red) within Altay Prefecture (yellow) and Xinjiang

- Location of the seat in Xinjiang Habahe (Xinjiang) Habahe (China)
- Coordinates (Habahe County government): 48°03′39″N 86°25′07″E
- Country: China
- Autonomous region: Xinjiang
- Prefecture: Altay
- County seat: Aqchi

Area
  - Total: 8,180.57 km^{2} (3,158.54 sq mi)

Population (2020)
  - Total: 82,524
  - Density: 10.088/km^{2} (26.127/sq mi)
- Time zone: UTC+8 (China Standard (Note: Locals in Xinjiang frequently observe UTC+6 (Xinjiang Time), 2 hours behind Beijing.))
- Website: www.hbh.gov.cn

Habahe County

Chinese name
- Simplified Chinese: 哈巴河县
- Traditional Chinese: 哈巴河縣
Transcriptions
Standard Mandarin
- Hanyu Pinyin: Hābāhé Xiàn
Yue: Cantonese
- Jyutping: haa^{1}baa^{1}ho^{4} jyun^{2}

Alternative Chinese name
- Simplified Chinese: 哈巴县
- Traditional Chinese: 哈巴縣
Transcriptions
Standard Mandarin
- Hanyu Pinyin: Hābā Xiàn

Uyghur name
- Uyghur: قابا ناھىيىسى
Transcriptions
- Latin Yëziqi: Qaba nahiyisi
- Yengi Yeziⱪ: Ⱪaba naⱨiyisi
- SASM/GNC: Kaba Nahiyusi
- Siril Yëziqi: Қаба наһийиси

Kazakh name
- Kazakh: قابا اۋدانى Kazakh Cyrillic: Қаба ауданы Kazakh Latin alphabet: Qaba aýdany

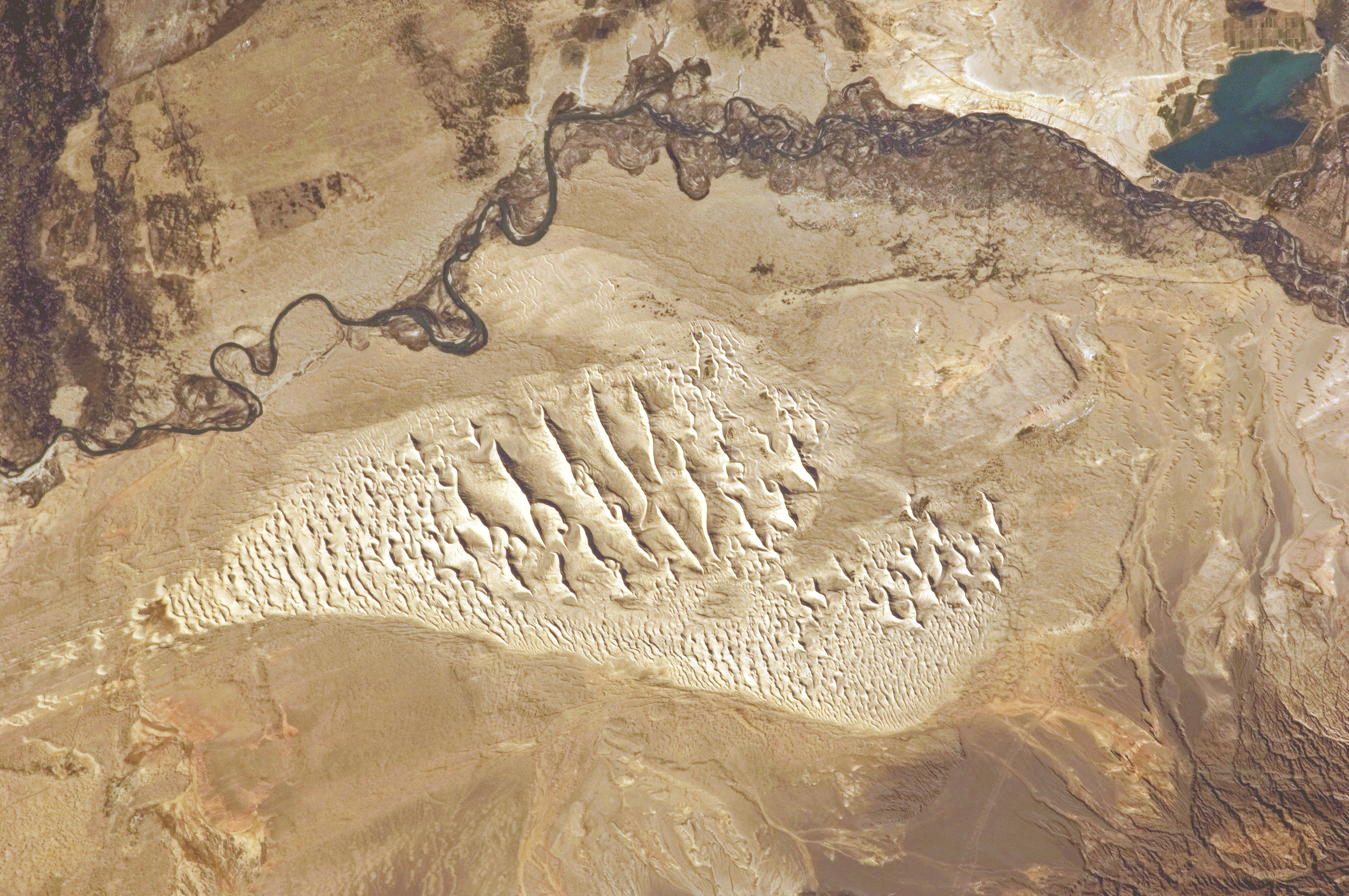
A satellite photo of the Irtysh River in the southeastern part of Habahe County and the southwestern part of Burqin County, and a desert south of it

Habahe County (Chinese: 哈巴河县) as the official romanized name, also transliterated from Uyghur as Kaba County (Uyghur: قابا ناھىيىسى; Chinese: 哈巴县), is a county situated in the far north of the Xinjiang Uyghur Autonomous Region and is under the administration of the Altay Prefecture. It has an area of 8,179 km^{2} (3,158 sq mi) with a population of 80,000. The Postcode is 836700.

== Administrative divisions ==
Habahe County is divided into 4 towns and 3 townships.

Name	Simplified Chinese	Hanyu Pinyin	Uyghur (UEY)	Uyghur Latin (ULY)	Kazakh (Arabic script)	Kazakh (Cyrillic script)	Administrative division code
Towns
Aqchi Town	阿克齐镇	Ākèqí Zhèn	ئاقچى بازىرى	Aqchi baziri	اقشي قالاشىعى	Ақши қалашығы	654324100
Sarbulaq Town	萨尔布拉克镇	Sà'ěrbùlākè Zhèn	ساربۇلاق بازىرى	sarbulaq baziri	ساربۇلاق قالاشىعى	Сарбұлақ қалашығы	654324101
Chibar Town	齐巴尔镇	Qíbā'ěr Zhèn	چىبار بازىرى	chibar baziri	شىبار قالاشىعى	Шыбар қалашығы	654324102
Kölbay Town	库勒拜镇	Kùlèbài Zhèn	كۆلباي بازىرى	kölbay baziri	كولباي قالاشىعى	Көлбай қалашығы	654324103
Townships
Sartam Township	萨尔塔木乡	Sà'ěrtǎmù Xiāng	سارتام يېزىسى	sartam yëzisi	سارتام اۋىلى	Сартам ауылы	654324200
Jayilma Township	加依勒玛乡	Jiāyīlèmǎ Xiāng	جايىلما يېزىسى	jayilma yëzisi	جايىلما اۋىلى	Жайылма ауылы	654324201
Tërëkti Township	铁热克提乡	Tiěrèkètí Xiāng	تېرېكتى يېزىسى	tërëkti yëzisi	تەرەكتى اۋىلى	Теректі ауылы	654324204

Others:

- XPCC 185th Regiment Farm (兵团一八五团) (185-تۇەن مەيدانى) (185-تۋان الاڭىنداعى)

== Demographics ==
The proportion of nationalities in Shanshan (Pichan) County
Nationality	Percentage
Kazakhs	60.4%
Han People	29.6%
Hui People	7.7%
Mongols	0.5%
Uyghurs	0.4%
Others	1.4%
Source of the population statistics :

== Climate ==
Climate data for Habahe, elevation 533 m (1,749 ft), (1991–2020 normals, extremes 1981–2010)
Month	Jan	Feb	Mar	Apr	May	Jun	Jul	Aug	Sep	Oct	Nov	Dec	Year
Record high °C (°F)	5.9 (42.6)	5.8 (42.4)	23.6 (74.5)	31.2 (88.2)	35.2 (95.4)	37.9 (100.2)	39.3 (102.7)	39.5 (103.1)	35.2 (95.4)	27.0 (80.6)	16.1 (61.0)	6.7 (44.1)	39.5 (103.1)
Mean daily maximum °C (°F)	−10.5 (13.1)	−6.7 (19.9)	2.5 (36.5)	15.8 (60.4)	22.9 (73.2)	28.0 (82.4)	29.6 (85.3)	28.1 (82.6)	21.6 (70.9)	12.8 (55.0)	1.0 (33.8)	−7.8 (18.0)	11.4 (52.6)
Daily mean °C (°F)	−14.4 (6.1)	−11.2 (11.8)	−2.9 (26.8)	8.9 (48.0)	15.7 (60.3)	21.0 (69.8)	22.6 (72.7)	20.9 (69.6)	14.6 (58.3)	7.0 (44.6)	−3.0 (26.6)	−11.2 (11.8)	5.7 (42.2)
Mean daily minimum °C (°F)	−17.7 (0.1)	−15.0 (5.0)	−7.3 (18.9)	3.0 (37.4)	9.0 (48.2)	14.4 (57.9)	16.4 (61.5)	14.5 (58.1)	8.7 (47.7)	2.5 (36.5)	−6.3 (20.7)	−14.2 (6.4)	0.7 (33.2)
Record low °C (°F)	−38.0 (−36.4)	−34.4 (−29.9)	−30.0 (−22.0)	−14.7 (5.5)	−3.1 (26.4)	2.9 (37.2)	8.1 (46.6)	4.2 (39.6)	−3.8 (25.2)	−16.7 (1.9)	−37.8 (−36.0)	−37.1 (−34.8)	−38.0 (−36.4)
Average precipitation mm (inches)	10.9 (0.43)	9.7 (0.38)	15.3 (0.60)	19.0 (0.75)	18.4 (0.72)	21.4 (0.84)	26.4 (1.04)	17.7 (0.70)	17.1 (0.67)	21.1 (0.83)	26.4 (1.04)	16.8 (0.66)	220.2 (8.66)
Average precipitation days (≥ 0.1 mm)	8.9	8.0	7.4	7.6	7.1	7.6	8.3	6.4	6.7	7.1	10.1	11.1	96.3
Average snowy days	11.2	10.8	9.3	2.5	0.2	0	0	0	0	2.5	11.1	14.4	62
Average relative humidity (%)	71	71	69	52	47	52	56	54	53	58	69	72	60
Mean monthly sunshine hours	149.0	174.3	230.2	270.8	331.0	335.5	335.3	320.8	270.5	203.5	134.8	122.9	2,878.6
Percentage possible sunshine	54	59	61	65	70	70	70	74	74	62	50	47	63
Source: China Meteorological Administration
