= Cherlak, Republic of Bashkortostan =

Cherlak Черлак
- Selo
- Location within Bashkortostan Location within Russia
- Coordinates: 55°44′N 54°45′E
- Country: Russia
- Region: Bashkortostan
- District: Dyurtyulinsky District
- Time zone: UTC+5:00

Cherlak (Russian: Черлак; Bashkir: Сарлаҡ, Sarlaq) is a rural locality (a selo) and the administrative centre of Cherlakovsky Selsoviet, Dyurtyulinsky District, Bashkortostan, Russia. The population was 584 as of 2010. There are 7 streets.

== Geography ==
Cherlak is located 38 km north of Dyurtyuli (the district's administrative centre) by road. Yusupovo is the nearest rural locality.
