= Uy (Irtysh) =

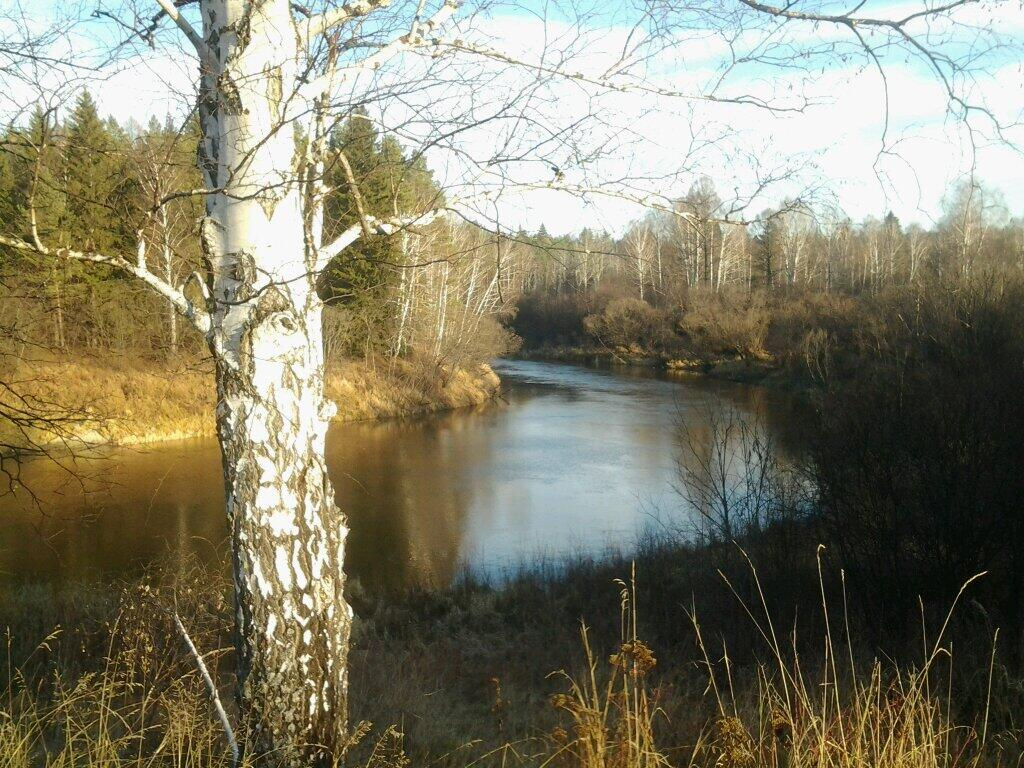
- Native name: Уй (Russian)

Location
- Country: Russia
- Region: Novosibirsk Oblast; Omsk Oblast

Physical characteristics
- Mouth: Irtysh
  - coordinates: 57.0897°N 74.1736°E
- Length: 387 km (240 mi)
- Basin size: 6,920 km^{2} (2,670 sq mi)

Basin features
- Progression: Irtysh→ Ob→ Kara Sea

The Uy (Russian: Уй) is a river in Novosibirsk and Omsk Oblasts in Russia. The Uy is a right tributary of the Irtysh. Its length is 387 kilometres (240 mi), and it drains a basin of 6,920 square kilometres (2,670 sq mi). The climate in its basin is mainly snowy, and there is flooding from April to June.

== Tributaries ==
Krapivka (26 km), Kargachi (35 km), Boborovka (55 km), Shchelkanovka (58 km), Bobrovka (68 km), Medvedevka (71 km), Yermakovka (80 km), Kitap (99 km), Unarka (104 km), Intsiss (123 km), Urmanka (134 km), Bolgun (144 km), Uchug (149 km), Shaitanka (158 km), Tereul (197 km), Kainsass (207 km), Stanovaya (217 km), Tuzovka (217 km), Maly Kainsass (230 km), Kainsass (236 km), Keizess (243 km), Shaitanka (256 km), Kalantsass (271 km), Prygan (285 km), Tunguzka (287 km), Iksashka (299 km), Kuitra (309 km), Taitas (324 km), Salym (356 km), Razvily (360 km).
