= Sedelnikovo, Omsk Oblast =

Rural locality in Omsk Oblast, Russia

Coordinates: 56°56′44″N 75°17′49″E

Sedelnikovo (Russian: Седе́льниково) is a rural locality (a selo) and the administrative center of Sedelnikovsky District, Omsk Oblast, Russia. Population: 5,316 (2010 census); 5,055 (2002 census); 5,132 (1989 Soviet census).
