= Sedelnikovo, Vladimir Oblast =

Sedelnikovo Седельниково
- Village
- Location within Vladimir Oblast Location within Russia
- Coordinates: 56°10′N 42°04′E
- Country: Russia
- Region: Vladimir Oblast
- District: Vyaznikovsky District
- Time zone: UTC+3:00

Sedelnikovo (Russian: Седельниково) is a rural locality (a village) in Oktyabrskoye Rural Settlement, Vyaznikovsky District, Vladimir Oblast, Russia. The population was 13 as of 2010.

== Geography ==
Sedelnikovo is located 17 km south of Vyazniki (the district's administrative centre) by road. Naguyevo is the nearest rural locality.
