= Haba River Shankou Dam =

- Location within China
- Official name: 哈巴河山口水电站
- Country: China
- Location: Habahe County
- Coordinates: 48°11′00.87″N 86°25′34.88″E
- Purpose: Power, water supply, irrigation, flood control
- Status: Operational
- Construction began: 1992
- Opening date: 1996; 30 years ago

Dam and spillways
- Type of dam: Embankment, concrete-face rock-fill
- Impounds: Haba River
- Height: 40.5 m (133 ft)
- Length: 550 m (1,800 ft)
- Elevation at crest: 627 m (2,057 ft)
- Width (crest): 7 m (23 ft)
- Spillway capacity: 800 m^{3}/s (28,000 cu ft/s)

Reservoir
- Total capacity: 50,000,000 m^{3} (41,000 acre⋅ft)
- Active capacity: 33,000,000 m^{3} (27,000 acre⋅ft)

Power Station
- Commission date: 1997
- Turbines: 4 x 6.3 MW Francis-type
- Installed capacity: 25.2 MW
- Annual generation: 109 million kWh

The Haba River Shankou Dam (Chinese: 哈巴河山口水电站; pinyin: Hǎbā hé Shānkǒu shuǐdiànzhàn, Haba River Shankou Hydroelectric Station) is a concrete-face rock-fill dam on the Haba River, a tributary of the Irtysh. It is located in Habahe County of the Xinjiang Uyghur Autonomous Region in China. The primary purpose of the dam is hydroelectric power generation, flood control and water supply for civil and irrigation use. It supports a 25.2 MW power station.

The dam is located about 15 km north (upstream) of the Habahe county seat. It is the last, in the upstream-to-downstream order, of the Haba River cascade, which eventually will contain 4 dams.

Construction on the 40.5 m (133 ft) tall dam began in October 1992 and its reservoir began to fill on 30 December 1996. On 13 January 1997 the power station was operational and the entire project to include the irrigation works was complete in September 1998.

The dam's reservoir holds 50 million cubic meters of water.

== See also ==
- Jilebulake Dam – upstream
- List of dams and reservoirs in China
- List of tallest dams in the world
