= Chonghu'er Dam =

- Location within China
- Country: China
- Location: Burqin County, Xinjiang Uighur Autonomous Region
- Coordinates: 48°11′00.37″N 87°9′5.20″E
- Purpose: Power
- Status: Operational
- Construction began: 2006
- Opening date: 2009; 17 years ago

Dam and spillways
- Type of dam: Gravity, roller-compacted concrete
- Impounds: Burqin River
- Height: 74 m (243 ft)
- Length: 545 m (1,788 ft)
- Width (crest): 8 m (26 ft)
- Width (base): 53.4 m (175 ft)

Reservoir
- Total capacity: 85,000,000 m^{3} (69,000 acre⋅ft)
- Surface area: 3.9 km^{2} (1.5 mi^{2})

Power Station
- Commission date: 2009
- Turbines: 4 x 27.5 MW Francis-type
- Installed capacity: 110 MW

The Chonghu'er Dam (Chinese: 冲乎尔水电站) or Chonghur Dam is a gravity dam on the river Burqin in Burqin County of Xinjiang Uighur Autonomous Region, China. The 74 m (243 ft) tall dam is constructed with roller-compacted concrete and supports a 110 MW hydroelectric power station. Construction on the dam began in 2006 and it was completed in 2009.

== See also ==
- Shankou Dam, a dam under construction downstream
