= Burqin Shankou Dam =

- Location within China
- Country: China
- Location: Burqin County, Xinjiang Uighur Autonomous Region
- Coordinates: 47°54′13″N 87°12′15″E
- Purpose: Water supply, power
- Status: Operational
- Construction began: 2009
- Opening date: 2014

Dam and spillways
- Type of dam: Arch
- Impounds: Burqin
- Height: 95 m (312 ft)
- Length: 311.5 m (1,022 ft)
- Width (crest): 10 m (33 ft)
- Width (base): 27 m (89 ft)

Reservoir
- Total capacity: 221,000,000 m^{3} (179,000 acre⋅ft)

Power Station
- Commission date: 2015-2016
- Turbines: 4 x 55 MW Francis-type
- Installed capacity: 220 MW

The Burqin Shankou Dam (Chinese: 布尔津山口水利枢纽工程; pinyin: Bù'ěrjīn Shānkǒu shuǐlì shūniǔ gōngchéng) is an arch dam in Burqin County of Xinjiang Uighur Autonomous Region of China.

The Burqin Shankou Dam is constructed in the narrow gorge of the Burqin, a right tributary of the Irtysh, in the area where it leaves the Altai Mountains for the Irtysh plain. This is a concrete arch dam 94 m tall; the dam (measured along its curved top) is 311.5 m long and 10 m wide at the top, and 27 m wide at the bottom. The dam creates a reservoir with the volume of 0.221 cubic km; the dam's hydroelectric plant will eventually generate 220 Megawatt of power. The construction work started in July 2009. In September 2014 the last of the concrete was poured on the dam and it began to impound its reservoir. The reservoir was filled by 30 April 2015 and the first generator was commissioned on 5 November 2015.

This dam creates a reservoir with a flooded area of 3.9 km^{2} and power density of 28.2W/m2. The dam also has a water release structure, a water intake system, a powerhouse, two main transformers and four sets of 220 kV transmission lines. The plant is estimated to run 3,555 hours annually, producing 391 GWh of power, of which 390.2 GWh will be supplied to the Northwest China Power Grid (NWPG).

As of October 2013, the Google Maps satellite view (probably a year or more old) shows the construction site, with a small coffer dam a bit upstream of the point where the permanent dam is being built.

== Clean Energy ==
The Northwest China Power Grid (NWPG) derives the bulk of its power from thermal power plants. The Burqin Shankou Dam will reduce that reliance on fossil-fuels. The dam is estimated to produce an equal amount of electricity that is currently generated by the thermal plants using fossil-fuels. This clean energy generation will reduce 325,442 tonnes of CO_{2} emissions annually.

== Water transfer ==
The Burqin River discharges into the Irtysh at location (Burqin Town, the county seat of Burqin County) that's downstream of most of water user's on Chinese territory; thus, from China's point of view, its water uselessly flows west, into the neighboring Kazakhstan. Although some water is already taken from the lower course of the Burqin for irrigation use within Burqin County itself (e.g., at 47°51′58″N 87°10′41″E), it is the Burqin Shankou Dam which will allow to use more of the Burqin's water within China. The first stage of the so-called Project for Bringing Western Water to the East (西水东引一期工程) calls for the construction of a canal from the Burqin Shankou Reservoir to the Project 635 Reservoir on the Irtysh which is located over 100 km upstream from Burqin Town, and which is the source of water for the Irtysh–Karamay–Ürümqi Canal.

== See also ==
- Burqin Chonghu'er Dam, an older dam upstream of the Burqin Shankou Dam
