= Renewable energy in Kazakhstan =

There is enormous potential for renewable energy in Kazakhstan, particularly from wind and small hydropower plants. The Republic of Kazakhstan has the potential to generate 10 times as much power as it currently needs from wind energy alone. But renewable energy accounts for just 0.6 percent of all power installations. Of that, 95 percent comes from small hydropower projects. The main barriers to investment in renewable energy are relatively high financing costs and an absence of uniform feed-in tariffs for electricity from renewable sources. The amount and duration of renewable energy feed-in tariffs are separately evaluated for each project, based on feasibility studies and project-specific generation costs. Power from wind, solar, biomass and water up to 35 MW, plus geothermal sources, are eligible for the tariff and transmission companies are required to purchase the energy of renewable energy producers. As of January 15, 2025, the Acting Minister of Energy of the Republic of Kazakhstan issued an order amending the rules for organizing and conducting renewable energy auctions. In addition, the World Bank's Ease of Doing Business indicator shows the country to be relatively investor-friendly, ranking it in 10th position for investor protection.

Kazakhstan is a party to the UN Framework Convention on Climate Change (1995) and ratified the Kyoto Protocol in 2009. Kazakhstan has committed to reduce greenhouse gas emissions. Having more renewable energy in the energy balance of Kazakhstan is one of the most effective mechanisms to reduce harmful effects of the energy sector and to diversify the national power generation capacity.

To help Kazakhstan meet its goals for renewable energy generation, the European Bank for Reconstruction and Development (EBRD) is launching the Kazakhstan Renewable Energy Financing Facility (KazREFF). The KazREFF aims to provide development support and debt finance to renewable energy projects which meet required commercial, technical and environmental criteria. Renewable energy technologies supported will include solar, wind, small hydropower, geothermal, biomass, and biogas. The Facility comprises an amount of up to €50 million for financing projects together with up to €20 million of concessional finance from Clean Technology Fund (CTF), and the technical assistance funded by the Japanese government through the Japan-EBRD Cooperation Fund (JECF).

In 2019, Kazakhstan launched 21 renewable energy facilities. The amount of green energy doubled over three years. In 2017, stations with renewable energy sources generated more than one billion kWh. In 2019, this indicator grew to nearly 2.5 billion kWh. As of 2020, there are 97 operating renewable energy facilities in Kazakhstan with over half of the renewable power generated by solar power plants.

== Current status ==
In 2013, the Government of Kazakhstan adopted a new law, On Supporting the Use of Renewable Energy Sources. This promotes technology-specific feed-in tariffs for selected renewable energy technologies, such as biomass, solar, wind, geothermal and hydropower, up to 35 MW. The cost of the programme is estimated at KZT 1,100 billion (c. €5.3 billion). A plan to develop alternative and renewable energy in Kazakhstan for 2013-2020 was adopted by the Government in 2013. The plan aims to install about 1040 MW renewable energy capacity by 2020, including 793 MW from wind, 170 MW from hydro and 4 MW from solar sources. The cost of the plan is estimated at KZT 317.05 billion (c. €1.25 billion). Also in 2013, the Government of Kazakhstan adopted the Energy Efficiency 2020 programme, which plans to reduce energy consumption by 10 percent annually until 2015. A long-term strategy for Kazakhstan (until 2050) was also adopted in 2012. The strategy sets an ambitious goal of generating 50 percent of all power from alternative energy sources, including renewable sources. There are more incentives for investment in renewable energy.

On November 22, 2012 Astana was chosen by the International Exhibitions Bureau (BIE) as the venue to host EXPO-2017, which focused on future energy issues. The theme of Future Energy is aimed to concentrate on both the future of energy but also on the potential energies of the future. Kazakhstan is very aware that the time has come for the world to move from fossil fuels to renewable energy sources. The selection of Astana to serve as host city is especially notable, because EXPO-2017 was the first time that a major international exhibition of this kind was held in a country from the former Soviet Union. More than 100 countries and 10 international organizations participated. The exhibition gathered and demonstrated best global developments in the field of energy conservation, as well as latest technology achievements in solar, wind and water energies. Moreover, the energy for the exhibition itself was obtained from renewable energy sources produced domestically.

In 2021, the city of Almaty has announced plans to increase production of renewable energy and green heat supply in the next 5 years.

== Hydro renewable energy ==
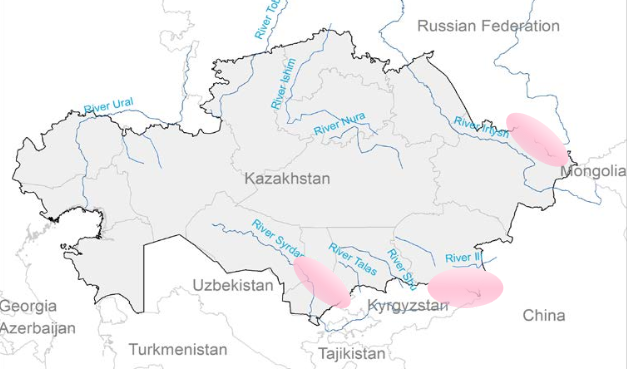
High potential regions for Hydropower plants

Small hydropower plants are the most rapidly developing areas of use of renewable energy in the country. Thus, in the period from 2007 to 2010 the Almaty region introduced five small hydropower plants with a total installed capacity of 20 MW. One of the important areas of energy efficiency of Kazakhstan's economy is construction of hydroelectric power plants on small rivers operating without retaining dams. Hydropower accounts for approximately 13% percent of Kazakhstan's total generating capacity delivering around 7.78TWh from 15 large (450 MW) hydropower station with a total capacity of 2.248GW. Large hydropower plants comprise the Bukhtyrma (750 MW), Shulbinsk (702MW) and Ust-Kamenogorsk (315 MW) plants on the Irtysh River, the Kapshagai (364 MW) plant on the Ili River, the Moinak (300 MW) plant on the Charyn Rriver and the Shardarinskaya (104MW) plant on the Syrdarya River. Small (1–10 MW) and medium-scale (10–50 MW) hydropower projects have become more popular because of their low cost, reliability and apparent environmental friendliness. There are seven small hydropower plants (<10 MW), with a total installed capacity of 78 MW and an estimated potential of 13 TWh, spanning east and south Kazakhstan, Zhambyl and Almaty provinces. According to experts, with the smaller hydropower stations installed, about 8 billion kWh can be produced per year, and this is more than enough to meet the demand that is now satisfied through imports from Central Asia. In December 2011 the Moynak hydropower plant (300 MW) was put into operation within the realization of the State Program for Rapid Industrial-innovative Development. A number of the projects to build smaller hydropower plants are being implemented in southern Kazakhstan.

== Solar energy ==
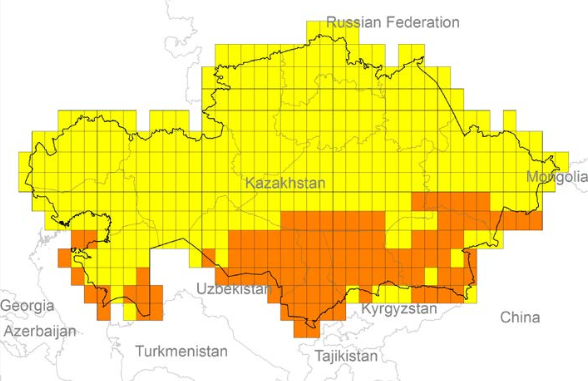
High potential regions for Solarpower plants

Kazakhstan has areas with high insolation that could be suitable for solar power, particularly in the south of the country, receiving between 2200 and 3000h of sunlight per year, which equals 1200–1700 kW/m2 annually. Both concentrated solar thermal and solar photovoltaic (PV) have potential. There is a 2 MW solar PV plant near Almaty and six solar PV plants are currently under construction in the Zhambyl province of southern Kazakhstan with a combined capacity of 300 MW. In addition to solar PV, concentrated solar thermal is advantageous given it does not require water for operation so can be used in desert and semi-desert areas, the materials (steel, glass, and concrete) are domestically produced in Kazakhstan and readily available, and solar thermal plants store energy in the form of heat, which is far more efficient than the batteries used in PV systems and allows electricity to be produced on demand, even after the sun has set, enabling both base and peak loads to be met. There are no current plans to install a concentrated solar thermal plant although the government plans to create 1.04GW of renewable energy capacity by 2020. The South-Kazakhstan, Kyzylorda oblast and the Aral region are the most suitable locations to build solar power plants.

The most significant project in this field implemented in 2002 in Kazakhstan and financed by the UN was to install 50 prism solar power plants with capacity of 100 liters of water each, and 50 solar stills, using the water from the Syr Darya river to provide the residents of two villages in the Aral region for drinking water and heating.

In particular, according to the Plan of Activities for Alternative and Renewable Energy in Kazakhstan, it is planned to put into operation about 28 solar energy projects until the end of 2020 with total installed capacity of 713.5 MW.

The European Bank for Reconstruction and Development (EBRD) financed two solar parks in Kazakhstan. The first one, 50 MW Burnoye Solar 1, was established in April 2014. The second one, known as Burnoye Solar 2, is also 50 MW and will be located in the Zhambyl region.

== Wind energy ==
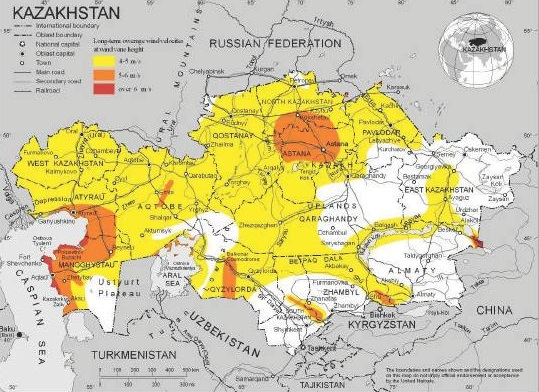
High potential regions for Windpower plants

Kazakhstan's steppe geography makes it suitable for wind energy applications and the estimated potential of wind energy that can be economically developed is about 760GW. About 50% of Kazakhstan's territory has average wind speeds suitable for energy generation (4–6 m/s) with the strongest potential in the Caspian Sea, central and northern regions. The most promising individual sites are in the Almaty region in the Dzungar (Dzungarian) Gates, 600 km northeast of Almaty close to the Xinjiang border and the Chylyk Corridor 100 km east of Almaty. Wind potentials of 525Wm2 in the Dzungar Gates and 240Wm^{2} in the Chylyk corridor have been estimated with power production from wind turbines potentially achieving 4400 kWh/MW and 3200 kWh/MW respectively. Currently, the Ministry of Industry and New Technologies selected 10 sites to build large wind power plants (WPP) with total capacity of 1,000 MW with a view to commercial production of electricity in the amount of 2-3 billion kWh. Currently only one wind energy plant is operating in Kazakhstan; the Kordai wind power plant with 1500 kW capacity was launched in December 2011 in Zhambyl region.

One of Kazakhstan's power companies, Samruk-Energy JSC, was recently awarded a $94 million loan from the Eurasian Development Bank to build Kazakhstan's largest wind farm. The project will produce 172 million kilowatt/hours of electrical energy per year, save more than 60 million tons of coal, and reduce emissions of greenhouse gases.

The first wind generator production plant in the post-Soviet region is set to be constructed in Kazakhstan's Aktobe. This project, with a cost of 84 million euros (US$95.3 million), is expected to create 500 jobs.

== Bioenergy ==
Kazakhstan has 76.5 Mha agricultural land, 10 Mha forest and 185 Mha steppe grasslands providing abundant biomass wastes and residues which have the potential to generate arrange of bioenergy services. Kazakhstan produces and exports crops such as wheat (winter and spring), rye (winter), maize (for grain), barley (winter and spring), oats, millet, buckwheat, rice and pulses, with an average grain yield of 17.5–20 Mt, which equates to roughly 12–14Mt of biomass wastes. Biomass wastes are currently poorly exploited and only ~10% of the total volume of the residues issued, mostly as a feed additive for livestock; the proportion of rural households using biomass cook stoves for cooking and heating is currently unknown. Organic wastes are also a potential source of energy and at least 400,000 households are known to keep cattle, horses and sheep. It has been estimated that electricity generation potential in Kazakhstan from biomass is 35 billion kWh per year and heat generation potential is 44 million Gcal per year. Various external funding agencies (UNDP, GEF, HIVOS Foundation) have supported the development of biogas initiatives including the Biogas Training Centre at the Eco-museum in Karanga (2002–2003) and the 'Azure Flame' Central Kazakhstan Biogas Education Centre (2004–2005) however despite this promotion there is only one large scale biogas unit currently in operation in the country which is a 360 kWe biogas plant run at Vostok village in the Kostanai region. The Vostok biogas unit consists of two 2400 m^{3} digesters operating with a feedstock of 40 t/day of cow, sheep and camel manure, grain residues and 1t/day of slaughterhouse waste. The plant was installed in 2011 by Karaman-K Ltd. and Zorg Biogas with an aim of delivering 3 million kWh of electricity annually. Another potential area is the use of biogas, which is produced from the waste of farms and poultry factories. Kazakhstan has a significant number of livestock and poultry. Methane production potential of the waste in cattle is more than 85 thousand tons. Potential methane production from waste-water communal services is about 3 million tonnes.

== Barriers to renewable energy ==
In spite of considerable renewable energy potential there are still significant barriers to address including: low electricity tariffs; transmission losses and inefficient technologies; weak regulatory and legal frameworks to stimulate the use of renewable energy in the electricity sector; persistent governmental body reforms; inadequate levels and quality of scientific support; awareness and information barriers; and a high-risk business environment. Obstacles to renewable energy promotion in Kazakhstan are similar to the ones that are persisting in Russia.

== Renewable energy projects ==
In 2016, Kazakhstan's capital Astana started testing and implementing energy-saving systems in construction. Thus, the Kazakhstan Centre for Modernisation and Development of Housing and Communal Services moved to a new building equipped with energy-saving wind and solar energy systems.

Kazakhstan encourages SME's to develop and implement green energy projects. To that end, Kazakhstan's DAMU Entrepreneurship Development Fund (DAMU) and European Investment Bank (EIB) has signed two contracts to finance SMEs working to mitigate climate change and protect the environment. The EIB agreed to provide €200 million (£169.04m) of funding to support small sustainable projects in Kazakhstan.

The Energy Ministry of Kazakhstan announced 2017 to be the "Green Energy" year with 37 new projects aimed at attracting investment in the renewable energy projects throughout the country.

One of Kazakhstan's primary goals in its transition to green economy set by President Nazarbayev is to achieve 50% of total electricity to be generated by renewable sources by 2050. As of mid-2017, there were 50 enterprises operating in Kazakhstan that produced energy from renewable sources with a total capacity of 300 megawatts.

One of the biggest renewable energy projects in the country is the EBRD's €500 million Kazakhstan Renewables Framework, established in 2016. The Framework's goal is to help the country respond to the challenges of climate change, increase investments in renewables, provide technical assistance and build institutional capacity.

== Green finance ==
Kazakhstan's goal to achieve the 50% share of alternative and renewable energy in all energy production by 2050 requires significant resources and investments. To that end, Kazakhstan's AIFC launched the Green Finance Centre to develop and promote green finance in the country.

Some of the key activities of the AIFC Green Finance Centre include developing green finance instruments and facilitating their introduction, supporting projects, providing training and certification of green finance specialists, etc.

Kazakhstan's first-ever green bonds were issued on the Astana International Exchange (AIX) by the Damu Entrepreneurship Development Fund (Damu Fund) in partnership with the United Nations Development Program (UNDP). The green bonds were listed in the amount of $478,469 with the goal of reducing investment risks in the country's renewable energy.

== Foreign direct investment ==
In 2014, Kazakhstan used the system of feed-in tariffs to attract foreign investment in renewable energy. Under feed-in tariffs, power producers receive a fixed payment for each unit of electricity generated, independent of the electricity market price. Due to the feed-in tariffs limitations, Kazakhstan transitioned to auctions in 2017 to capitalize on falling renewable energy prices. Kazakhstan became the first Central Asian country to use auctions to contract renewable energy projects.

== See also ==
- KazKuat (2005), state-owned organization for domestic hydro-electric sector
