= Shoqan Walikhanov =

Kazakh ethnographer (1835–1865)

Shokan Walikhanov
- Шоқан Уәлиханов
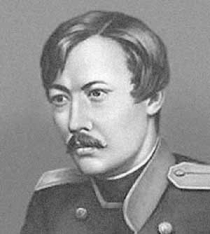
- A portrait of Shokan Valikhanov in his military uniform
- Born: Muhammed-Qanafiya Ualihanov; November 1835; Kushmurun fort in Kostanay Province
- Died: April 10, 1865 (aged 29); Village of Sultan Tezek in Almaty Province
- Other name: Shoqan Walikhanuli
- Citizenship: Russian Empire
- Occupations: Scholar; historian; ethnographer; folklorist; Officer in Asiatic Department of Ministry of Foreign Affairs
- Spouse: Aisary Walikhanova
- Parents: Shyngys Walikhanov (father); Zeinep Shormanova (mother)

Shokan Shyngysuly Walikhanov (Note: Kazakh: Шоқан Шыңғысұлы Уәлихан, romanized: Şoqan Şyñğysūly Uälihan; Russian: Чокан Чингисович Валиханов, romanized: Chokan Chingisovich Valikhanov; given name Muhammed-Qanafiya; Kazakh: Мұхаммед Қанафия, romanized: Mūhammed Qanafiia. Shoqan, his pen-name, later became his official name.) (November 1835 – April 10, 1865) was a Kazakh scholar, ethnographer, historian and participant in the Great Game. His reputation "as the father of modern Kazakh history and ethnography" is recorded in the Historical Dictionary of Kazakhstan. The Kazakh Academy of Sciences became the Ch.Ch. Valikhanov Kazakh Academy of Sciences in 1960. English-language texts sometimes give his name as "Chokan Valikhanov", based on a transliteration of the Russian spelling that he used himself.

== Childhood ==
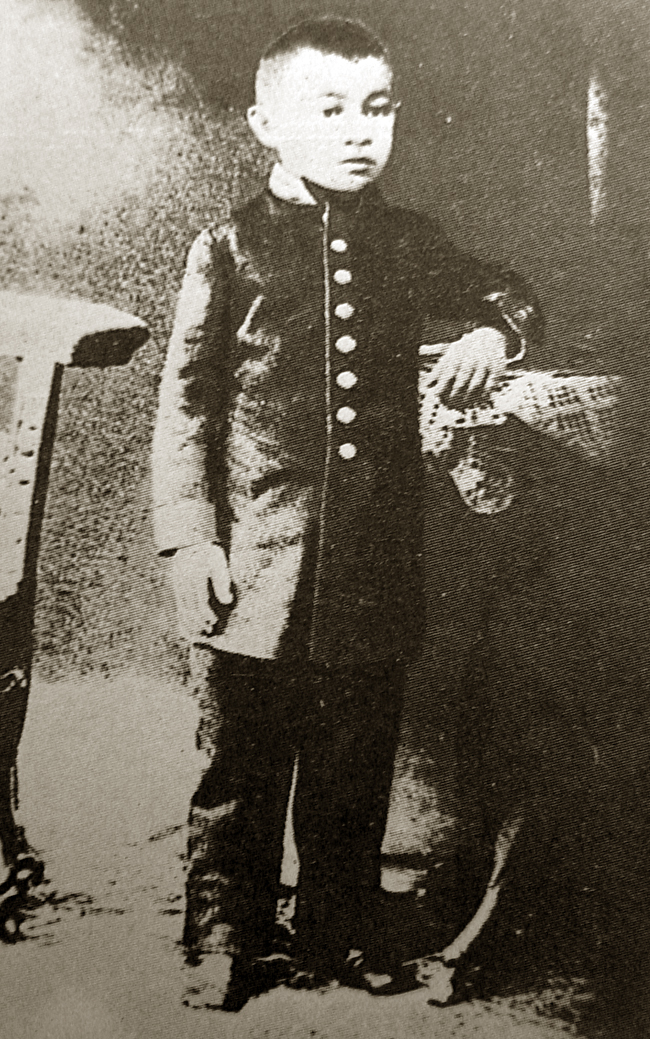
Shoqan in 1847, upon enrolling in the Omsk Military Academy

Muhammed Shoqan Shyngysuly Qanafiya Walikhanov was born in November 1835 in the newly developed Aman-Karagai district within the Kushmurun fort in what is nowadays the Kostanay Province, Kazakhstan. He was a fourth generation descendant of Abu'l-Mansur Khan, a khan of the Kazakh Middle Jüz, he was a direct descendant of Genghis khan. Shoqan's family was very respected by the government of the Russian Empire, and Walikhanov's father was awarded, during his life, six appointments as senior Sultan of Kushmurun okrug, a term as chief Kazakh advisor to the frontier board, a promotion to Colonel, and a separate term as senior Sultan in the Kokshetau okrug.

Shoqan spent his youth in his father’s traditional yurt. His father Chingis arranged his son’s early education, enrolling him in 1842 at age six in a small private school, or maktab, which provided a secular education. Here he began his education in the Kazakh language, which used the Arabic script at the time.

At an early age Shoqan moved from his father’s home to the estate of his paternal grandmother Aiganym, in Syrymbet. Shoqan was enrolled in the Siberian Cadet Corps by his grandmother.

Walikhanov entered the military academy in Omsk in 1847. After graduating from the Omsk Cadet School, where he read not only Russian but also English literature, Walikhanov traveled extensively in Central Asia in the late 1850s. It was during his stay in Omsk that Walikhanov first made the acquaintance of Fyodor Dostoevsky.

== Adult life ==
His work combined military intelligence and geographic exploration and other things. His first successful expedition was his 1855-56 mission to the region of Issyq Köl. He was afterwards called to the capital in St. Petersburg in 1857 to report, and there he was elected to the Russian Geographical Society.

On June 28, 1858, Walikhanov began the expedition that would lead him to instant fame throughout Europe and into the pages of history. Serving as a decoy to the geo-political intentions of the mission, Walikhanov embarked with a caravan of 43 men, 101 camels and 65 horses. Following his successful passage through the Chinese border without suspicion, the caravan arrived in Kashgar in early October of 1858. Over the course of a half-year, Walikhanov took meticulous notes regarding major towns, including maps, the goods in the bazaars, the languages spoken and the customs practiced.

The expedition ended following increased suspicions, and they left Kashgar in April 1859. Walikhanov returned to St. Petersburg and became a fixture of the intellectual and cultural life during his short stay (1860 - spring of 1861) in the capital. The young Walikhanov was a staunch proponent of Westernization and critical of the influence of Islam in his homeland. In the words of the ethnographer Nikolai Yadrintsev, for Walikhanov European civilization represented "the new Quran of life."

In the spring of 1861 he became seriously ill with tuberculosis and had to leave St. Petersburg. He returned to his native steppe region in hopes of restoring his health. He never returned to St. Petersburg while frequent relapses in his health prevented advances in his career. In letters to his friend Dostoevsky, Walikhanov mentioned several unsuccessful plans to return to St. Petersburg. Walikhanov also mentioned campaigning for a political position in the West-Siberian Governor Generalship, centered in Tobolsk, like his father. In 1862, he successfully ran for senior Sultan, but Governor-General Alexander Duhamel ru:Дюгамель, Александр Осипович refused to confirm his position due to Walikhanov's health.

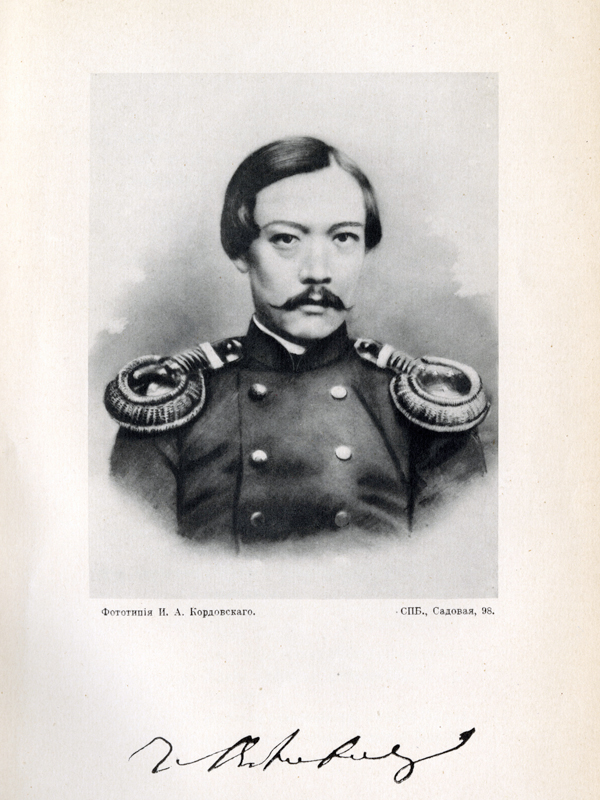
Portrait of Shoqan Walikhanov made in St. Petersburg by I. A. Kardovsky

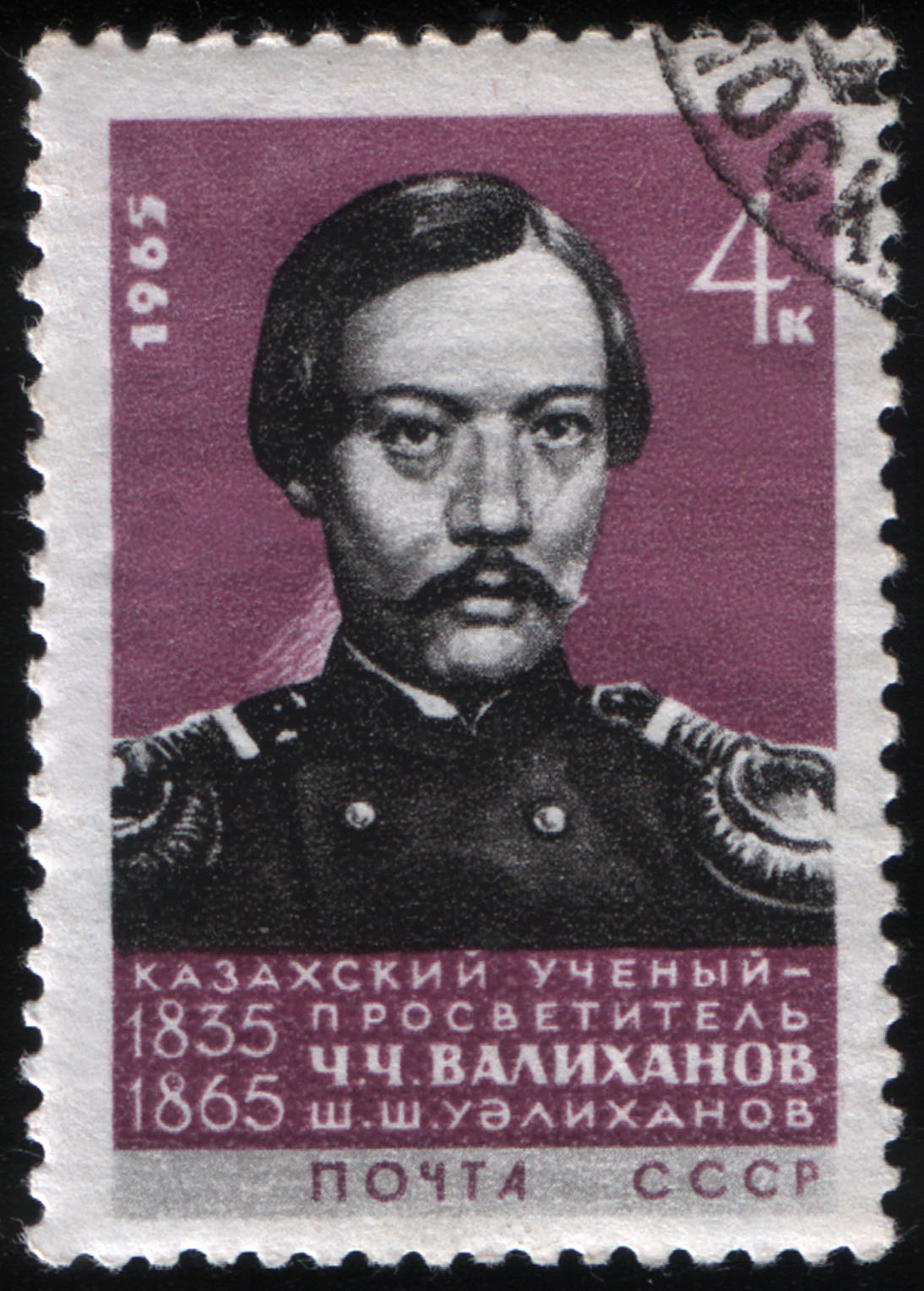
Shoqan Walikhanov on a 1965 Soviet commemorative stamp.

Walikhanov collected materials on Kazakh judicial practices in 1863. This was part of a government-backed project given by Duhamel, and led to the 1864 Memorandum on Judicial Reform. In 1864, Shoqan was assigned to help with Colonel Cherniaev's continued conquest of Central Asia. Cherniaev’s forces marched west from the fortress of Vernoe (modern-day Almaty). Chernaiev advanced towards the Khanate of Kokand, planning to attack the fort at Aulie-Ata (modern-day Taraz). Shoqan unsuccessfully pushed for a negotiated result without violence. Cherniaev won an easy victory and returned to Vernoe. Shoqan left Chernaiev after the events at Aulie-Ata and, after stopping Vernoe, moved to the village of Sultan Tezek on the Ili River north of Vernoe. Colonel Cherniaev, however, was not unhappy with Walikhanov's work, and recommended him for a promotion.

Shoqan spent his last remaining months in the village of Sultan Tezek, eventually marrying Sultan Tezek’s sister, Aisary. During this time, letters of correspondence to General Kolpakovski, military governor of Semipalatinsk oblast, dated between November 1864 through February 1865, addressed Muslim revolts and rebel activity in nearby Qulja. Kolpakovski held such esteem for Shoqan that he offered Shoqan a position in his administration once his health was restored.

Walikhanov succumbed to his illness on April 10, 1865, at the age of 29. He was buried in the nearby cemetery of Kochen-Togan in present-day Almaty Province.

Nikolay Veselovsky, who in 1904 edited a collection of Walikhanov’s works, said that the short life of Walikhanov was a “meteor flashing across the field of oriental studies."

== Walikhanov and Dostoevsky ==
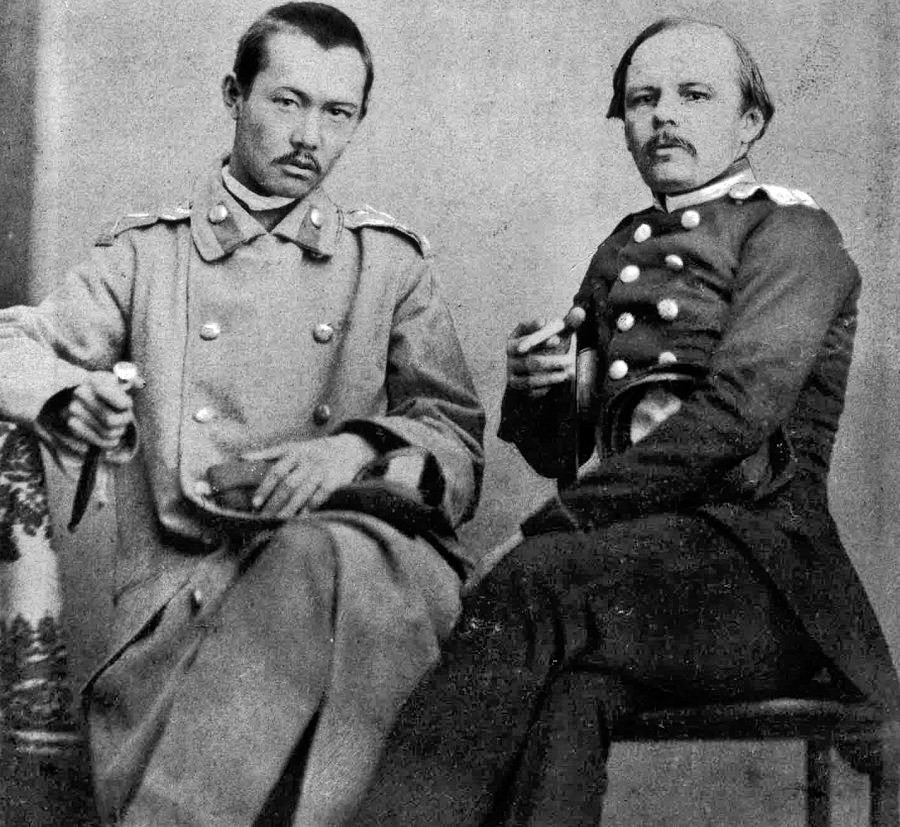
Shoqan Walikhanov and Fyodor Dostoyevsky

While still in Omsk, Dostoevsky had met Shoqan Walikhanov. In Dostoevsky's opinion, Walikhanov was a brilliant, intrepid person, a scholar and ethnographer, and a talented folklorist. In their correspondence, the two intellectuals admitted their great mutual love and admiration.

When Dostoevsky served in Semipalatinsk (now known as Semey), he met Walikhanov once again. The two men were also closely acquainted with renowned geographer Peter Semenov Tian-Shansky and Baron A. E. Wrangel, who came to Semipalatinsk from Petersburg in 1854 to serve as the new district prosecutor.

Dostoevsky wrote from Semipalatinsk on 14 December 1856 one of his most enthusiastic letters ever, addressed to his friend Walikhanov:

You write me that you love me. I will tell you without ceremony that I have fallen in love with you. Never, to anybody, not even to my own brother, have I felt such attraction as I do to you, and God knows how this has come about. One could say much in explanation, but why should I praise you! And you will believe in my sincerity even without proof, my dear Vali-khan, and even if one were to write ten books on this theme, one would write nothing: feeling and attraction are inexplicable

— Fyodor Dostoevsky, 14 December 1856, Semipalatinsk

There is a statue of Walikhanov and Dostoevsky in the city of Semey, Kazakhstan, near the local Dostoevsky museum.

== Major works ==
Walikhanov produced many articles and books devoted to the history and culture of Central Asia. A short list:

- "Chinese Turkestan and Dzungaria: Walikhanov and other Russian travellers", The Russians in Central Asia, London, Edward Stanford, 1865.
- Traces of Shamanism among the Kazakhs
- Regarding the camps of Kazakh nomads
- The Qazakhs
- Tengri
- Forms of Kazakh Traditional Poesy
- Issyk-Kul Travel Journal
- Kul-Ju Travel Journal
- Notes on jungars

Walikhanov also compiled epic poetry, including "Kozy-Korpesh - Bayan-Sulu", as well as collecting the first known recorded variant of what he called the Iliad of the Steppe, the Epic of Manas, from an unnamed performer later identified as Nazar Bolot uulu. Walikhanov's published presentation of Manas, reflecting his familiarity and engagement with Russian literary culture, has shaped future understanding of the epic.

Walikhanov's report of his trip to Kashgar in 1858-59 remains a valuable account on the situation in Xinjiang in the aftermath of Wali Khan's invasion of the region and on the eve of the Muslim Rebellion of the 1860s.

=== The Shoqan Walikhanov spring ===
The Shoqan Walikhanov spring, named in Walikhanov’s honor, is in the Altyn-Emel National Park. It is located in the Kerbulak district of Almaty region, on the road to the singing Dunes, among the tract at the foot of the Maly Kalkan Mountains. Walikhanov's path ran from Russia to Kashgaria in 1856, through the territory of what is now the park. The expedition stopped to rest at the spring. Since that time, there has been a folk belief that the water in the spring is healing and can cure many diseases. There is a small stream from which possible to drink water in July and August months, when the spring mostly dries up.

== Works by Walikhanov available in English ==
- Selected Works of Chokan Valikhanov: Pioneering Ethnographer and Historian of the Great Steppe. Ed. Nick Fielding, tr. Arch Tait. London: Embassy of the Republic of Kazakhstan in the United Kingdom of Great Britain and Northern Ireland working in partnership with Cambridge University Press, 2000.
- "General view of Dzungaria" and "Travels in Dzungaria", by Captain Walikhanov: in Michell, John; Walikhanov, Shoqan Chingisovich; Venyukov, Mikhail Ivanovich (1865), The Russians in Central Asia: their occupation of the Kirghiz steppe and the line of the Syr-Daria : their political relations with Khiva, Bokhara, and Kokan : also descriptions of Chinese Turkestan and Dzungaria; by Capt. Walikhanov, M. Veniukof and [others]. Translated by John Michell, Robert Michell, E. Stanford
