= List of power stations in Kazakhstan =

The following page lists all power stations in Kazakhstan.

== Fossil fuel ==
=== Coal ===
Name	Location	Coordinates	Capacity, MWe	Operational	Notes
AES-Ekibastuz (Ekibastuz GRES-1 Power Station)	Ekibastuz	51.884809°N 75.377111°E	4000 MW	1983 -	Two 330-metre-tall (1,080 ft) chimneys
Ekibastuz GRES-2 Power Station	Ekibastuz	52.023972°N 75.47625°E	1000 MW	1987 -	Tallest chimney in the world (419.7 metres), planned extension to 4000 MW
Karagandy GRES-1	Karaganda	51.884809°N 75.377111°E	84 MW	1942 -	Oldest power station in Kazakhstan

== Renewable ==
=== Hydroelectric ===
Station	Location	Co-ordinates	Capacity (MW)
Bukhtarma Hydroelectric Power Plant	Serebryansk	49.658878°N 83.347263°E	675
Kapshagay Hydroelectric Power Plant		43.9229045°N 77.097888°E	364
Oskemen Hydroelectric Power Plant	Ablaketka	49.901172°N 82.718682°E	368
Shulbinsk Hydroelectric Power Plant	Shulbinsk	50.398670°N 81.068974°E	702

=== Solar ===
Station	Location	Owner/operator	Co-ordinates	Capacity (MW)
Baikonur solar power plant	Kyzylorda Region	Baikonur Solar LLP		50
M-KAT	Jambyl Region	Access Power Limited		75
Nomad	Kyzylorda Region	Access Power Limited		28
Nurgisa	Almaty Region			100
Burnoye Solar-1	Zhualy	Kazakh Samruk Kazyna Invest LLP		50
Burnoye Solar-2	Zhualy	Kazakh Samruk Kazyna Invest LLP		50

== Nuclear ==
- Aktau (Kazakhstan State Corporation for Atomic Power and Industry)
  - BN-350 43.606748°N 51.283321°E: 135 MWe reactor operational 1958-1999
- Kazakhstan has signed the contract with Atomstroyexport, a subsidiary of Russia's Rosatam state nuclear corporation to build Kazakhstan's first nuclear power plant.

== See also ==
- List of power stations in Europe
- List of largest power stations in the world
