= Kapchagay Reservoir =

Reservoir in southeastern Kazakhstan

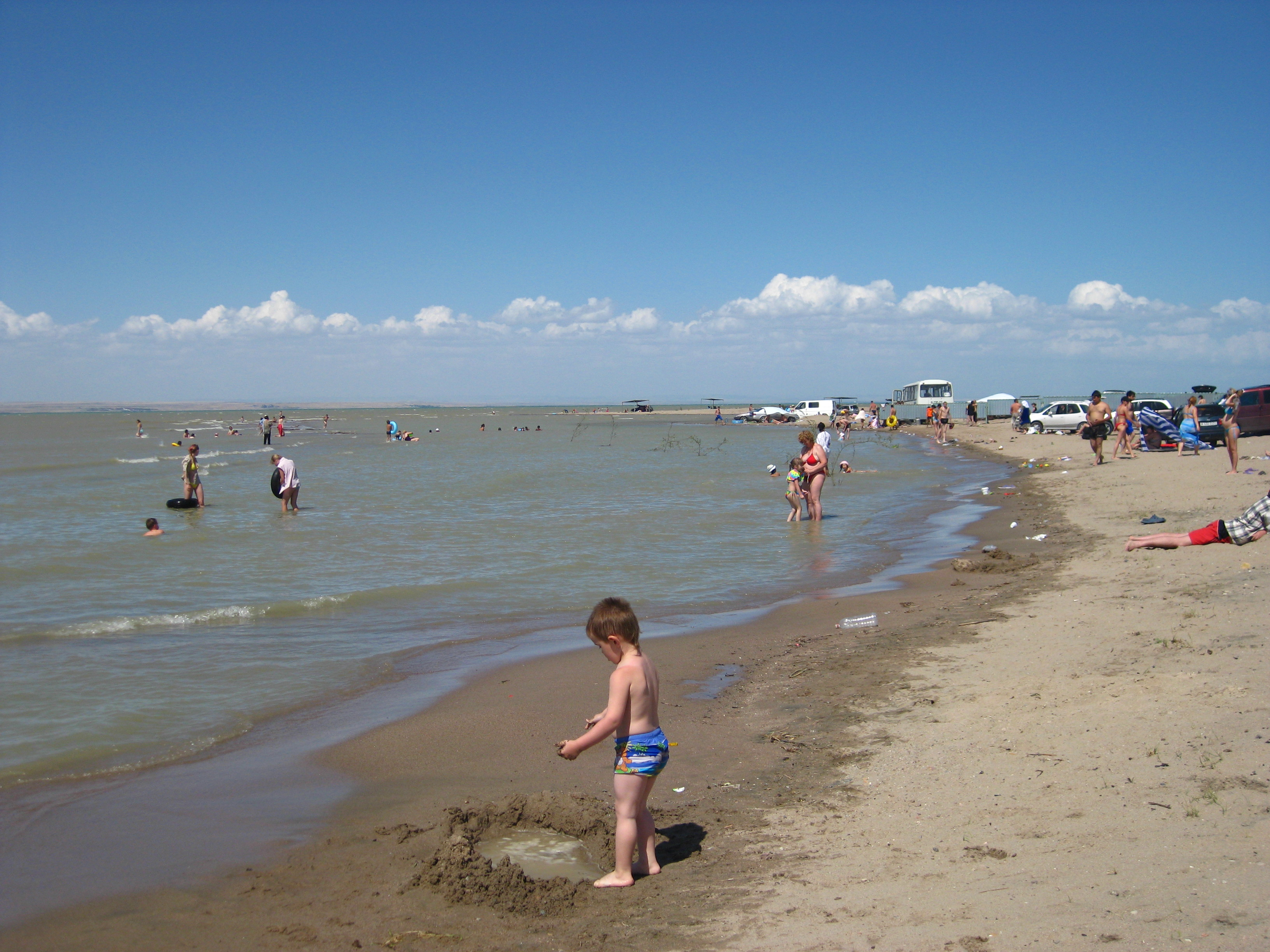

- Location within Kazakhstan Location within Asia
- Location: Almaty Region, Kazakhstan
- Coordinates: 43°52′0″N 77°30′0″E
- Basin countries: Kazakhstan

Kapchagay Reservoir (Russian: Капчагайское водохранилище) or Qapshaghai Reservoir (Kazakh: Қапшағай су қоймасы, romanized: Qapşağai su qoimasy), sometimes referred to as Lake Kapchagay, is a major reservoir in Almaty Region in southeastern Kazakhstan, approximately 80 km (50 mi) north of Almaty. The 140 km (87 mi) long lake is formed by the Kapchagay Dam on the Ili River which flows from the mountains in the east towards Lake Balkhash to the northwest. The dam and reservoir are named for the "narrow gorge" that preceded their construction; Iliysk—which had to be moved to accommodate the reservoir—was renamed Kapchagay after the dam in 1970; it was subsequently renamed Qonayev in 2022. During the summer months the lake attracts a number of tourists from Almaty, who frequent its beachy shores on the weekends.

In some parts of the Kapshagay reservoir, a coastal zone was created, which is now known as Kapshagay lake because of its impressive size (length 180 km, width 22 km, depth up to 50 m). It was created over the course of about 15 years (1965–1980) and is now one of the largest artificial lakes in Kazakhstan.

== History ==
In 1967, an extension of irrigated areas began, and in 1970, the Kapchagay Reservoir, the largest reservoir in the region, began to fill. The lake is located some 80 km north of the old capital of Almaty.

The reservoir was created with the aim of regulating river flow and meeting growing economic demands. A dam and hydroelectric power plant were erected on the River Ili, creating the Kapchagay reservoir. However, the project took years to complete on account of the inadequacy of the water sources.

It was expected that the reservoir would be a major benefit to the arid soil in the region; however, the complete filling of the Kapchagay reservoir started to affect the water level in lake Balkhash. Filling of the reservoir discontinued in 1982. By 1986, Kapchagay reservoir was still only half full, this improved by 1988. Nevertheless, in 1991, the volume of Kapchagay reservoir was only 36% of the capacity originally projected.

In recent years, the area has become one of the best-known resort destinations in Kazakhstan. This is largely due to the area's scenery, which includes the Trans-Ili Alatau mountains (part of the northern Tian Shan mountain system), and the Almaty Nature Reserve on the reservoir's East coast. The Kapchagay lake has also become a popular resort on account of the area's good weather conditions, as well as its recreation spaces that include boating, catamarans, boats, jet skis, yachts, entertainment centers, and casinos. Kapchagay reservoir is currently one of the most visited places in the Almaty region.

The reservoir presently has multipurpose functions, serving for hydroelectricity production, irrigation storage, transport, fisheries, urban and industrial water supplies, regulation of water discharges to maintain water quality, for nature conservation and recreation.

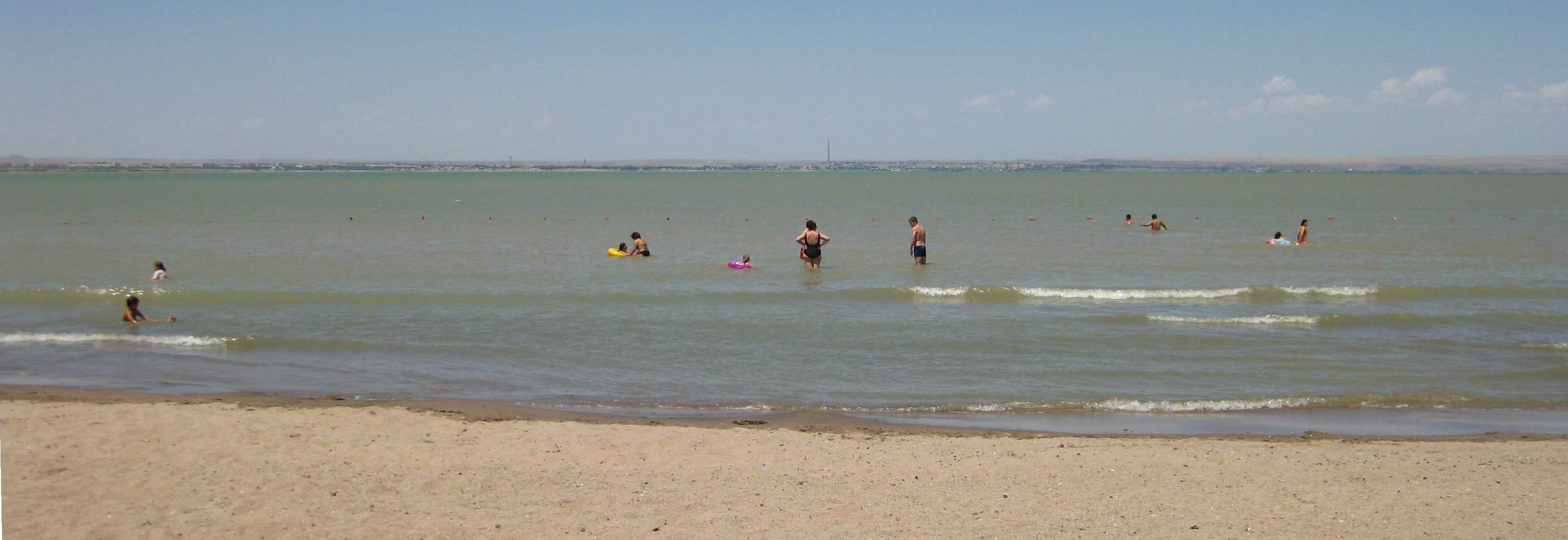

== Environmental concerns ==
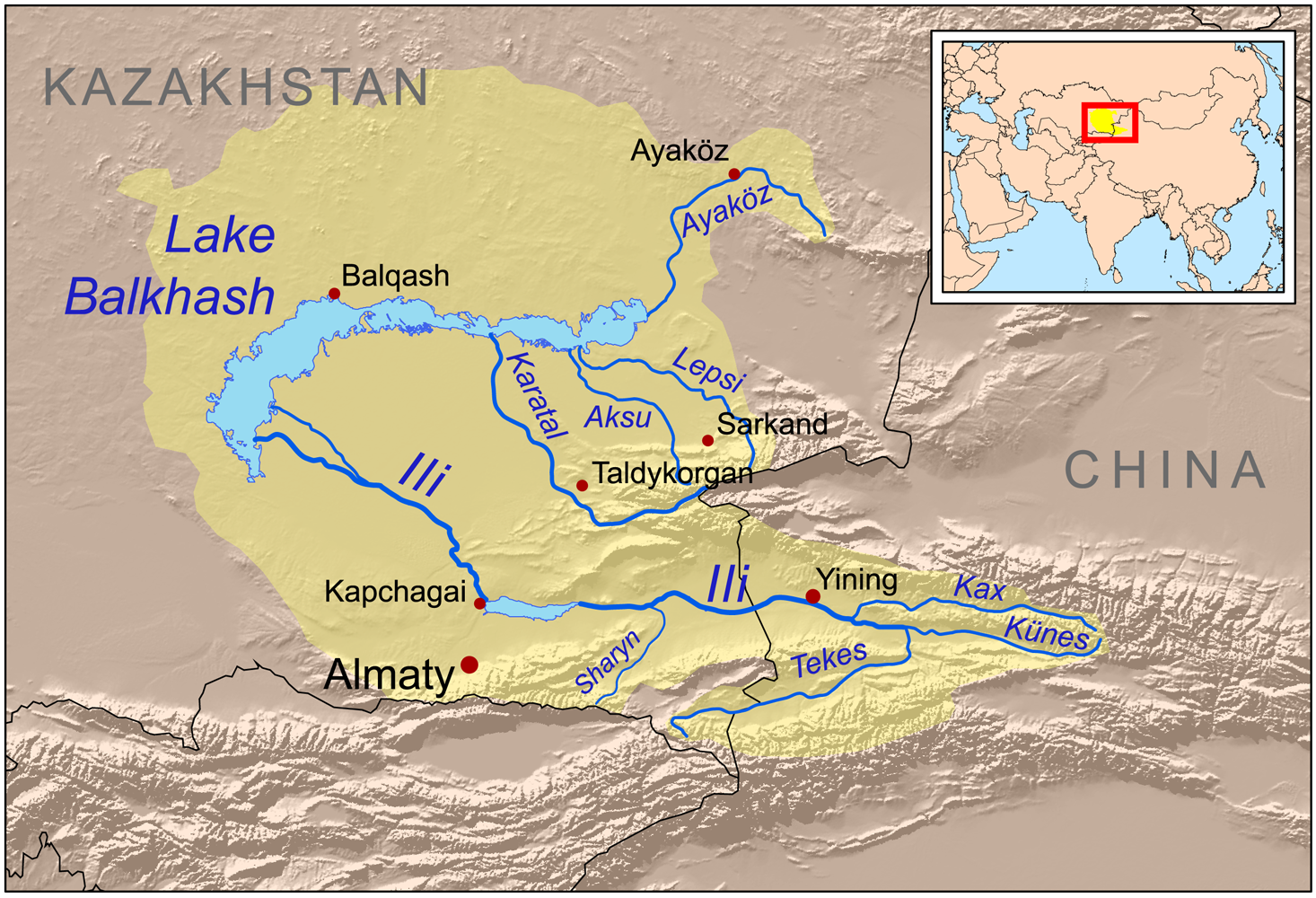
Map of the Lake Balkash basin. Kapchagay is the smaller lake seen to the southeast of Lake Balkash

The Kapchagay dam was completed in late 1969 and began slowly filling the reservoir in 1970, over a period of 20 years. The hydroelectric project was also seen as important in that the lake would provide an abundant water supply and irrigation for arid farming in the region. However, environmentalists have expressed deep concerns about its environmental impact upon Lake Balkash, given that the equilibrium and balance of water has been seriously disturbed. Between 1970 and 1985, the volume of Lake Balkash declined by 39 km^{3} to directly feed the Kapchagay Reservoir, and by 1987, Lake Balkash had reached its all-time low point in volume, dropping roughly 7 feet (2.2 metres) in depth. However, in 1988, this situation improved when the volume of Balkash increased once more from river discharge from the east, although the water quality had been dramatically reduced and became increasingly saline.

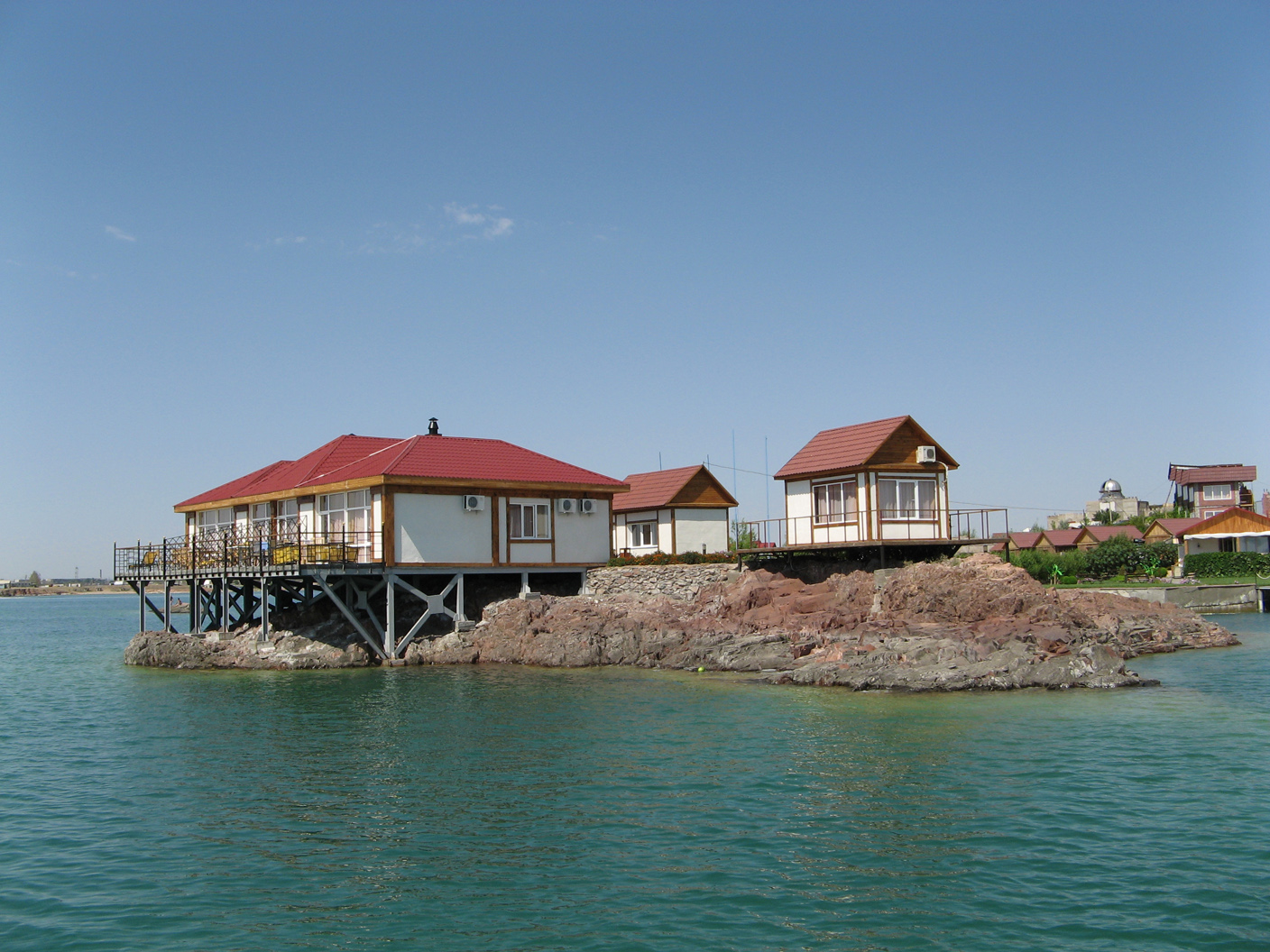

=== Fishing and agriculture ===
The reservoir has had a major impact upon fish populations, especially given that commercial fishing operations have been practiced in the reservoir, fuelling the local economy. In 1975, 24 species of fish were recorded in Kapchagay Reservoir, but in 1980 this had fallen to 18, directly affecting the industry. However, between 1985 and 1991 as the river reached its current capacity, fish stocks in the lake stabilised and since 1980 there has been a marked growth in the fishing industry on the lake after its decline in the 1970s. The reservoir has also been responsible for rising groundwater levels which has made it impossible to grow crops on land adjacent to the lake in many parts. As a result, many agricultural villages in the area such as Akozek, Kerbulak and Chengildi are located several kilometres from the lake, rather than on its bank.

== See also ==
- Sorbulak
- Talgar (river)
