= Nurgisa 100 MW Solar Park =

Photovoltaic power plant in Qonayev, Almaty, Kazakhstan

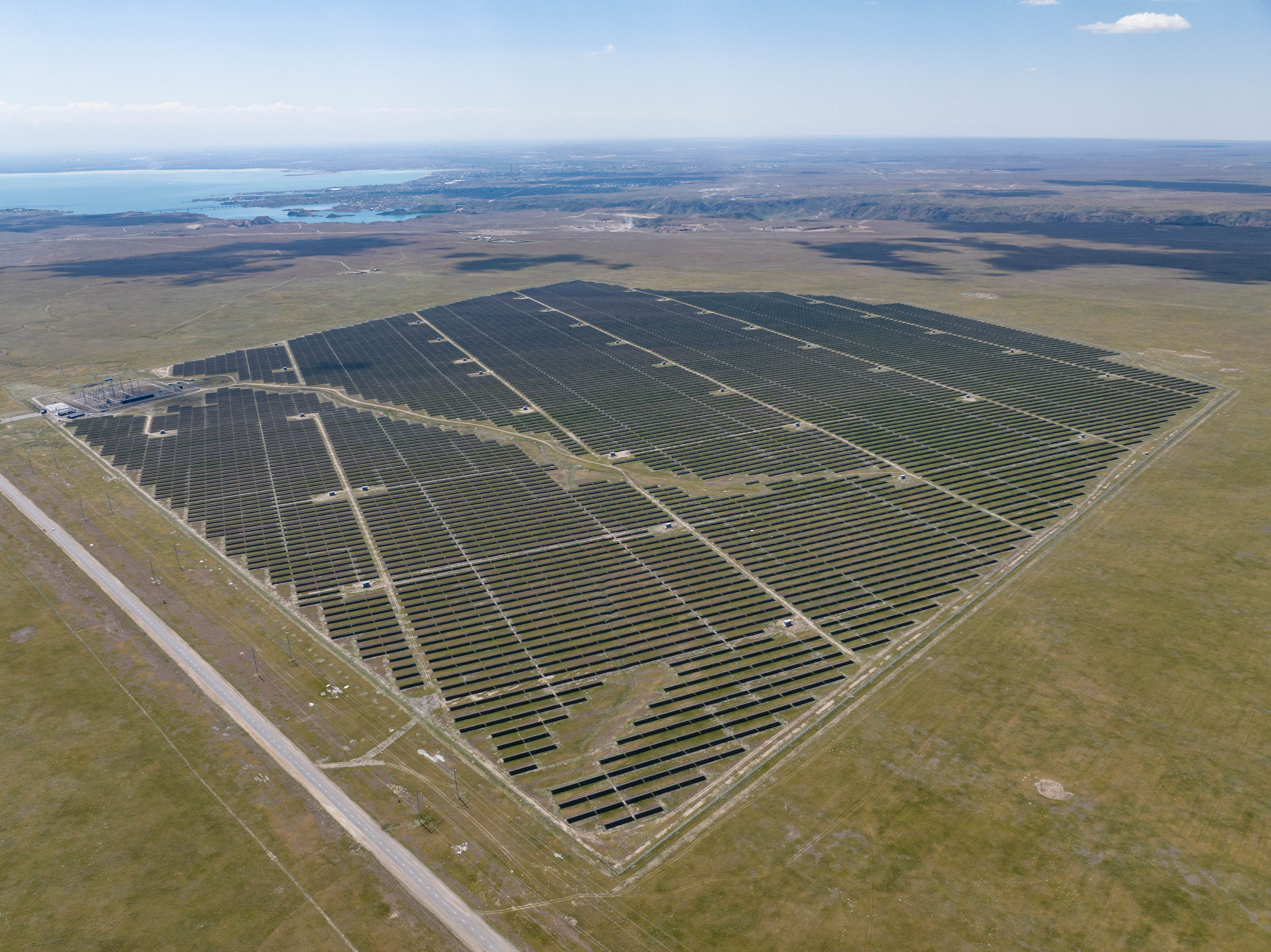
- Country: Kazakhstan
- Location: Qonayev, Almaty
- Coordinates: 43°58′06.1″N 77°06′47.0″E
- Commission date: August 2019
- Construction cost: ₸27.7 billion

Solar farm
- Type: Standard PV

Power generation
- Nameplate capacity: 100 MW

The Nurgisa 100 MW Solar Park is a photovoltaic power station in Qonayev, Almaty Region, Kazakhstan.

== History ==
The power station was commissioned in August 2019.

== Architecture ==
The power station was built on a 270 hectares of land.

== Technical specifications ==
The power station consists of 303,000 solar panels. Each of it generates 330 W.

== Finance ==
The power station was built with a cost of ₸27.7 billion. About ₸10 billion of it was financed by the Development Bank of Kazakhstan for 10 years loan.

== See also ==
- List of power stations in Kazakhstan
