= Serebryansk =

Serebryansk Серебрянск
- Town
- Location in East Kazakhstan Province, Kazakhstan
- Coordinates: 49°40′55″N 83°17′5″E
- Country: Kazakhstan
- Region: East Kazakhstan
- District: Zyryan District

Government
  - Akim: Nurgul Bakynova

Population (2009)
  - Total: 10,129
- Time zone: UTC+6 (Astana Time)
- Postal code: F42****

Serebryansk (Kazakh: Серебрянск, Serebriansk; Russian: Серебрянск) is a town in Zyryan District in East Kazakhstan Region of eastern Kazakhstan. Population: 10,129 (2009 census results); 11,903 (1999 census results). The town is located on the right bank of the Irtysh River, downstream of the Bukhtarma Hydroelectric Power Plant.

== History ==
Serebryansk was founded in 1953 as the urban-type settlement of Serebryanka. The purpose of the settlement was to host workers employed in the construction of the Bukhtarma Hydroelectric Power Plant. Previously, the village of Novo-Alexandrovka was located on the site of the settlement. On July 9, 1962 Serebryanka was granted town status within Zyryan District.

== Economy ==
=== Industry ===
Serebryansk mainly serves the hydropower plant. There is also a chemical plant.

=== Transportation ===
The town is served by Serebryanka railway station on the railway connecting Oskemen and Zyryanovsk.

Serebryansk has access to the paved road which follows he right bank of the Irtysh and connects Oskemen and Zyryanovsk.
