= AES Corporation =

American energy company

The AES Corporation

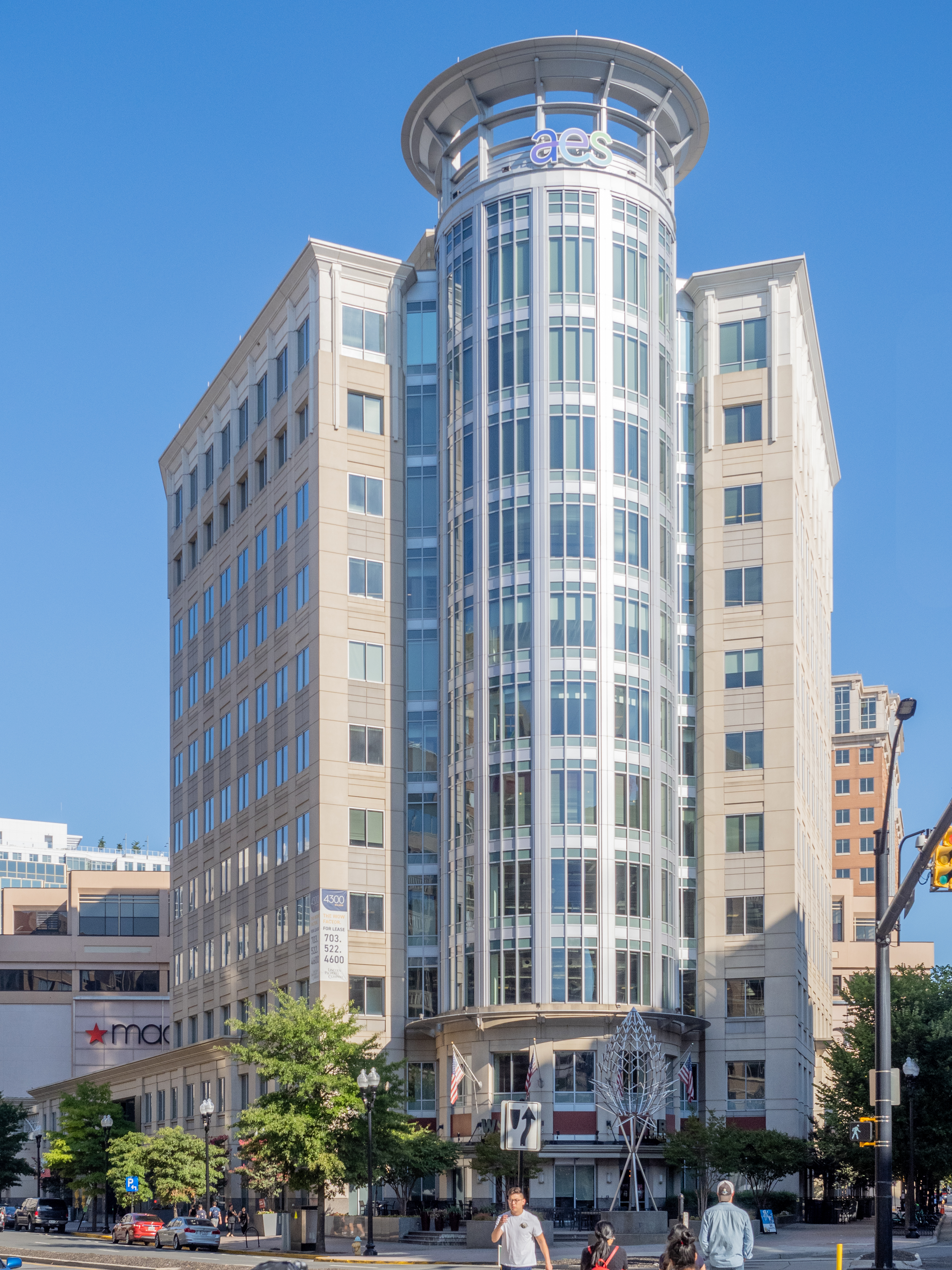
- AES headquarters in Arlington County, Virginia, in 2022
- Formerly: Applied Energy Services, Inc. (1981–2000)
- Type: Public
- Traded as: NYSE: AES; S&P 500 component
- Industry: Energy
- Founded: January 28, 1981; 45 years ago
- Founders: Roger Sant; Dennis Bakke
- Headquarters: Arlington, Virginia, U.S.
- Area served: Worldwide
- Key people: Jay Morse (chairman); Andres Gluski (president & CEO)
- Products: Electricity
- Revenue: ▼US$12.2 billion (2025)
- Net income: ▼US$900 million (2025)
- Total assets: ▲US$51.8 billion (2025)
- Total equity: ▲US$4.06 billion (2025)
- Number of employees: 8,336 (2025)
- Website: aes.com

The AES Corporation is an American utility and power generation company, headquartered in Arlington, Virginia. It is a global Fortune 500 power company.

== History ==
=== 20th century ===
The company was founded on January 28, 1981, as Applied Energy Services by Roger Sant and Dennis Bakke, two appointees of the Federal Energy Administration under president Richard Nixon. They raised $1.2 million and founded AES, whose values were environmental responsibility and conservation, and with the explicit goal of having fun. Its corporate culture was anti-capitalist.

The company was initially a consulting firm; it became AES Corporation, which went public in 1991. Sant was chairman, CEO, and president and Bakke was executive vice president until assuming the position of president in 1987. Bakke was the company's CEO from 1994 until his resignation in 2002 in the midst of a liquidity crisis that followed the collapse of the energy giant Enron.

The company's efforts to modernize the electricity grid in Tbilisi, Georgia, through its acquisition of Telasi, were documented in the feature documentary Power Trip, directed by Paul Devlin.

=== 21st century ===
Sant remained as executive chairman until 2003 and as a member of the board until 2006. Paul Hanrahan was appointed president and CEO and remained for ten years, overseeing the stabilization of the company. Until the early 2000s, the company followed self-management, delegating much responsibility to ordinary employees. In 2012, Hanrahan resigned his position as president and CEO of the company, and he was succeeded by Andres Gluski. As CEO, Gluski has implemented a strategy of reducing the number of countries in which AES does business, from 28 to 16, for the purpose of consolidating operations and reducing costs. Additionally, he began a program of reducing the company's total carbon emission intensity.

Bakke and Sant oversaw much of AES's initial global expansion, building power plants in 29 countries and expanding its staff from 1,400 to 32,000 employees, and also instilled a system of decentralized management that emphasized social responsibility above profit. In recent years, AES has signaled a commitment to providing its consumers and clients with renewable forms of energy, and its operations construction and provision of solar and wind-based energy storage systems.

AES acquired the assets of Indianapolis Power & Light (also known as IPL or IPALCO) in 2000. In February 2021, Indianapolis Power & Light rebranded as AES Indiana.

AES acquired the Chilean-based subsidiary Gener in 2000 and acquired DPL Inc., then known as Dayton Power & Light, in 2011. Although retaining its name for legal purposes, the company was rebranded as AES Ohio in February 2021.

In March 2026, a consortium led by BlackRock subsidiary Global Infrastructure Partners and Swedish private equity firm EQT AB agreed to acquire AES for a total enterprise value of $33.7 billion, including its $22.7bn of debt.

== Major properties and subsidiaries ==
- AES Indiana, formerly IPL – Indianapolis Power & Light Company
- Premier Power
- AES Andes
- Shulbinsk Hydroelectric Power Plant
- Oskemen Hydroelectric Power Plant
