= Akozek =

Akozek Ақөзек
- Village
- Location in Kazakhstan
- Coordinates: 43°56′28″N 77°30′52″E
- Country: Kazakhstan
- Region: Almaty Region

Population (2009)
  - Total: 536
- Time zone: UTC+6 (Omsk Time)

Akozek (Kazakh: Ақөзек, Aqözek) is a small agricultural village in Almaty Region of south-eastern Kazakhstan. Akozek is located several kilometres north of the Kapchagay Reservoir (Qapshaghay Bogeni Reservoir).
