= Nazar Bolot uulu =

Kyrgyz oral poet

Nazar Bolot uulu (Назар Болот уулу) (died 1893) was a Kyrgyz oral poet.

Later folkloric sources and oral history record him as the unnamed performer of the first known transcription of an episode from the Epic of Manas, collected in 1856 by Shoqan Walikhanov in San-Tas.

While Shoqan Walikhanov's general comments about the epos were published and widely disseminated, the actual transcription was misplaced, only to be rediscovered by Alkey Margulan in the Leningrad Academy of Sciences in 1964. The manuscript was later edited by A. T. Hatto.
