= Talgar (river) =

River in Kazakhstan

Talgar Талғар
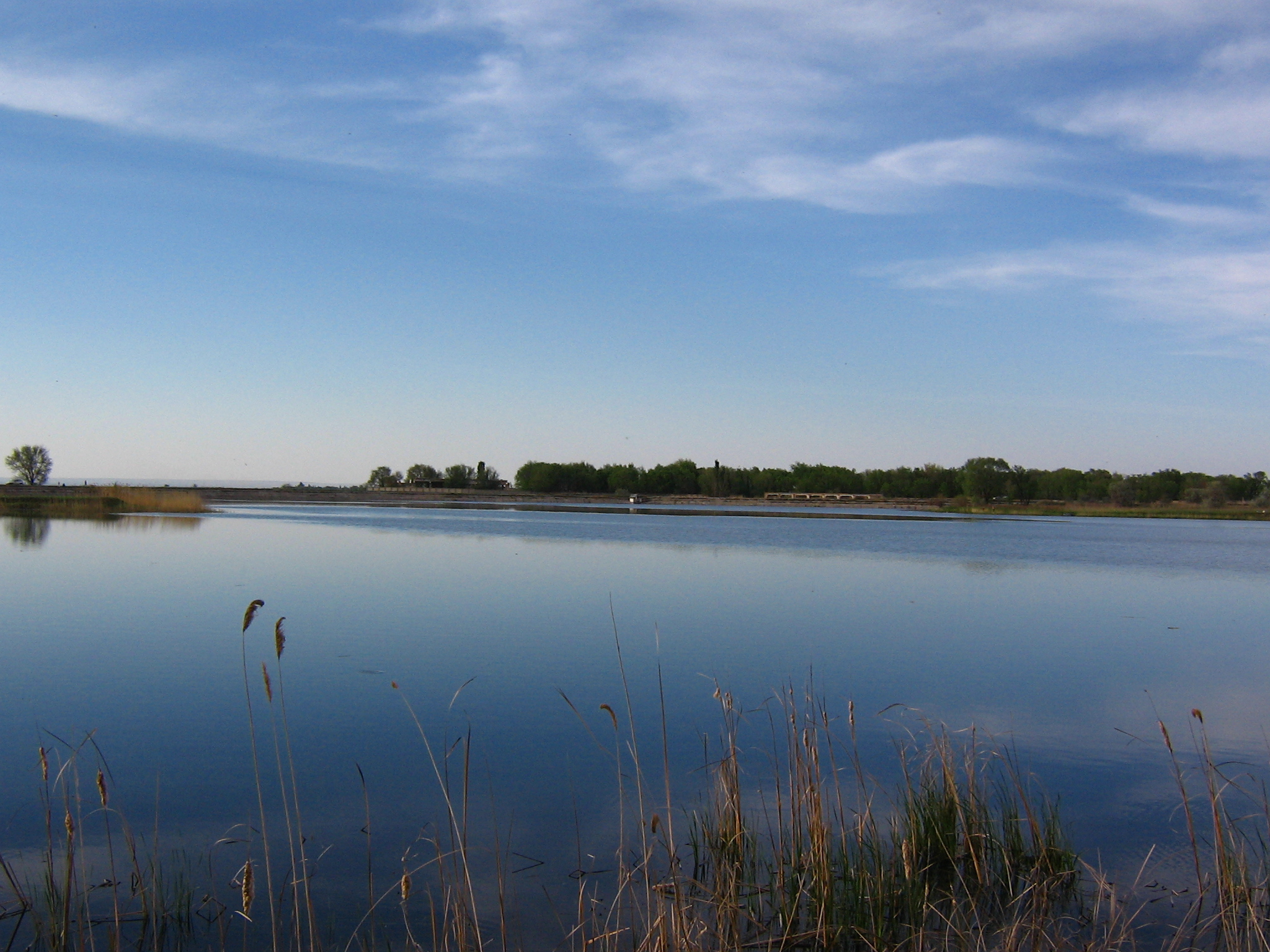
- View of one of the small dams in the last stretch of the river

- Mouth location in Kazakhstan

Location
- Country: Kazakhstan

Physical characteristics
- Source: Trans-Ili Alatau
  - coordinates: 43°15′17″N 77°12′54″E
  - elevation: 1,201 m (3,940 ft)
- Mouth: Kapchagay Reservoir
  - coordinates: 43°47′15″N 77°14′15″E
  - elevation: 475 m (1,558 ft)
- Length: 117 km (73 mi)
- Basin size: 444 km^{2} (171 sq mi)
- Discharge
  - average: 10.6 cubic metres per second (370 cu ft/s) at Talgar town

Basin features
- Progression: Kapchagay → Ili → Balkhash

The Talgar (Kazakh: Талғар) is a river in Almaty Region, Kazakhstan. It has a length of 117 km (73 mi) and a drainage basin of 444 km^{2} (171 sq mi).

The Talgar flows by the town of Talgar, the administrative center of Talgar District.

== Course ==
The Talgar river originates at the confluence of rivers Left Talgar and Right Talgar, which have their sources in a glacier area of the Trans-Ili Alatau range, part of the Tian Shan. It flows northwards through a valley with steep slopes. About midway down its course, it descends into a floodplain. Since 1970 the river has had its mouth on the southern lakeshore of the Kapchagay Reservoir.

The Talgar is seasonally prone to floods. A string of small dams has been built in its last stretch, along with a network of irrigation channels.

== See also ==
- List of rivers of Kazakhstan
