= Chernyaev =

Chernyaev or Chernyayev (Russian: Черняев) is a Russian masculine surname, its feminine counterpart is Chernyaeva. It may refer to

- Anatoly Chernyaev (1921–2017), Russian historian and writer
- Ilya Chernyaev (1893–1966), Russian and Soviet chemist
- Irina Cherniaeva (born 1955), Russian pair skater
- Mariya Chernyayeva (b. 1966), former synchronized swimmer from the Soviet Union
- Mikhail Chernyayev (1828–1898), Russian military leader

== See also ==
- Cherniaiev
