= Sorbulak =

Lake in Kazakhstan

- Сорбұлақ
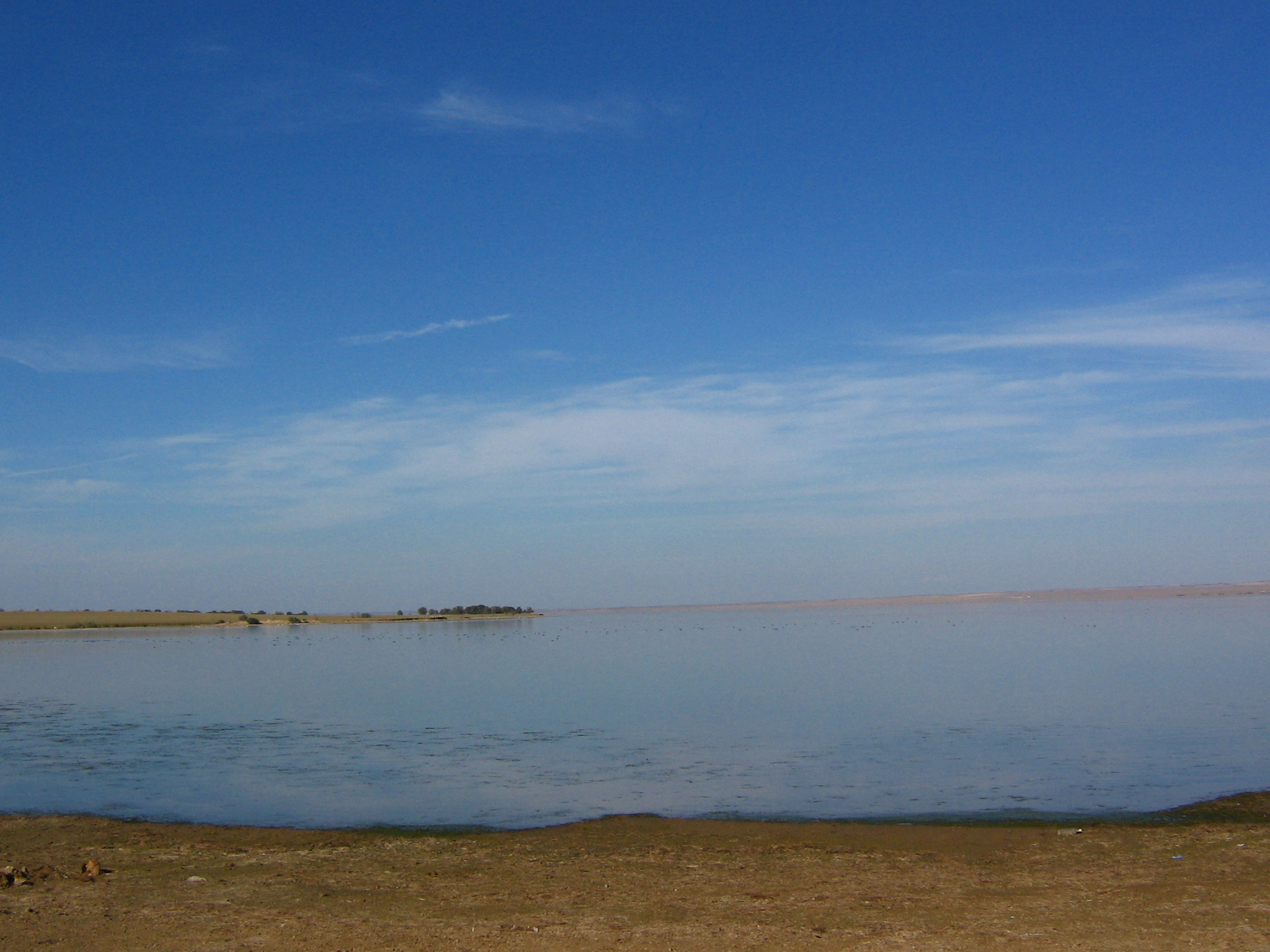
- View of the lake in October

- Location within Kazakhstan

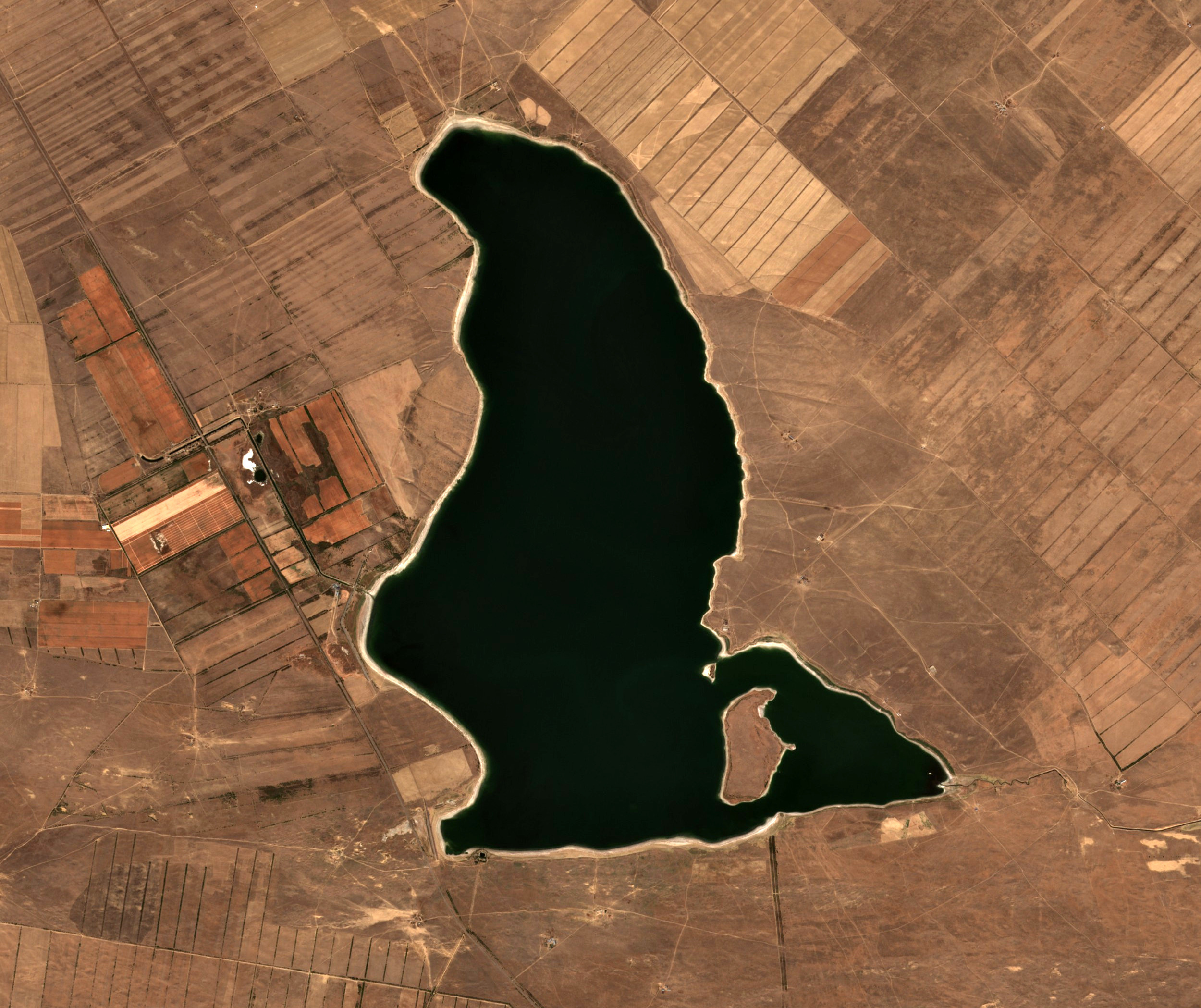
- Sorbulak lake Sentinel-2 image (2022)
- Location: Karaoi Plateau
- Coordinates: 43°41′N 76°35′E
- Type: endorheic
- Primary inflows: Kaskelen
- Basin countries: Kazakhstan
- Max. length: 33 kilometers (21 mi)
- Max. width: 10 kilometers (6.2 mi)
- Surface area: 55 square kilometers (21 sq mi)
- Max. depth: 22 meters (72 ft)
- Residence time: UTC+6
- Shore length^{1}: 66 kilometers (41 mi)
- Surface elevation: 622 meters (2,041 ft)
- Islands: 1
- ^{1} Shore length is not a well-defined measure.

Sorbulak (Kazakh: Сорбұлақ) is a lake in Ile District, Almaty Region, Kazakhstan.

The lake lies 40 kilometers (25 mi) NNW of Almaty, near the M-36 Highway. Along with a group of neighboring small lakes to the east, it collects sewage and industrial waste from the city. The lake formed in the period between 1975 and 1985, at the time of the Kazakh SSR government, following an official decision implemented in 1969.

In the 19th century, the lake was called Gorky.

== Geography ==
Sorbulak is a lake located at the confluence of the Kurty and Kaskelen rivers in southeastern Kazakhstan. It lies in a natural hollow 30 kilometers (19 mi) to the WSW of the Kapchagay Reservoir. The water is fresh, but with a very high concentration of nitrates. The lake is deep, reaching a maximum depth of 22 meters (72 ft). The bottom of the lake has a 1.5 meters (4 ft 11 in) thick layer of silt containing metals, including iron, copper, zinc, cadmium and lead. There is one small island off the SE shore of the lake. In the second half of the summer Sorbulak becomes brackish owing to high evaporation.

The lake is surrounded by semidesert and agricultural fields. There are sand dunes near the shore reaching a height of 15 meters (49 ft).

== Flora and fauna ==
In most places reeds grow along the lakeshore. Sorbulak is an Important Bird Area for the breeding, migrating and wintering of a number of water bird species.

== See also ==
- List of lakes of Kazakhstan
