= KazKuat =

KazKuat is a state-owned organization established in February 2005 to accelerate the development of the domestic hydro-electric sector in Kazakhstan. KazKuat's main goal is to construct and modernise electric power plants in the country The company is responsible for overlooking the building of the $81m Kerbulak Power Station on the Ili River to increase the capacity of the Kapshagai plant by 160 MW to provide peak-load power during the winter. KazKuat is also responsible for the modernisation plans, estimated at a cost of $47.9m, of Shardarin Power Station and a $270m project on the Bulak Power Station on the Irtysh River.
