= Oskemen Hydroelectric Power Plant =

Hydroelectric power station in Kazakhstan

Oskemen Hydro Power Plant
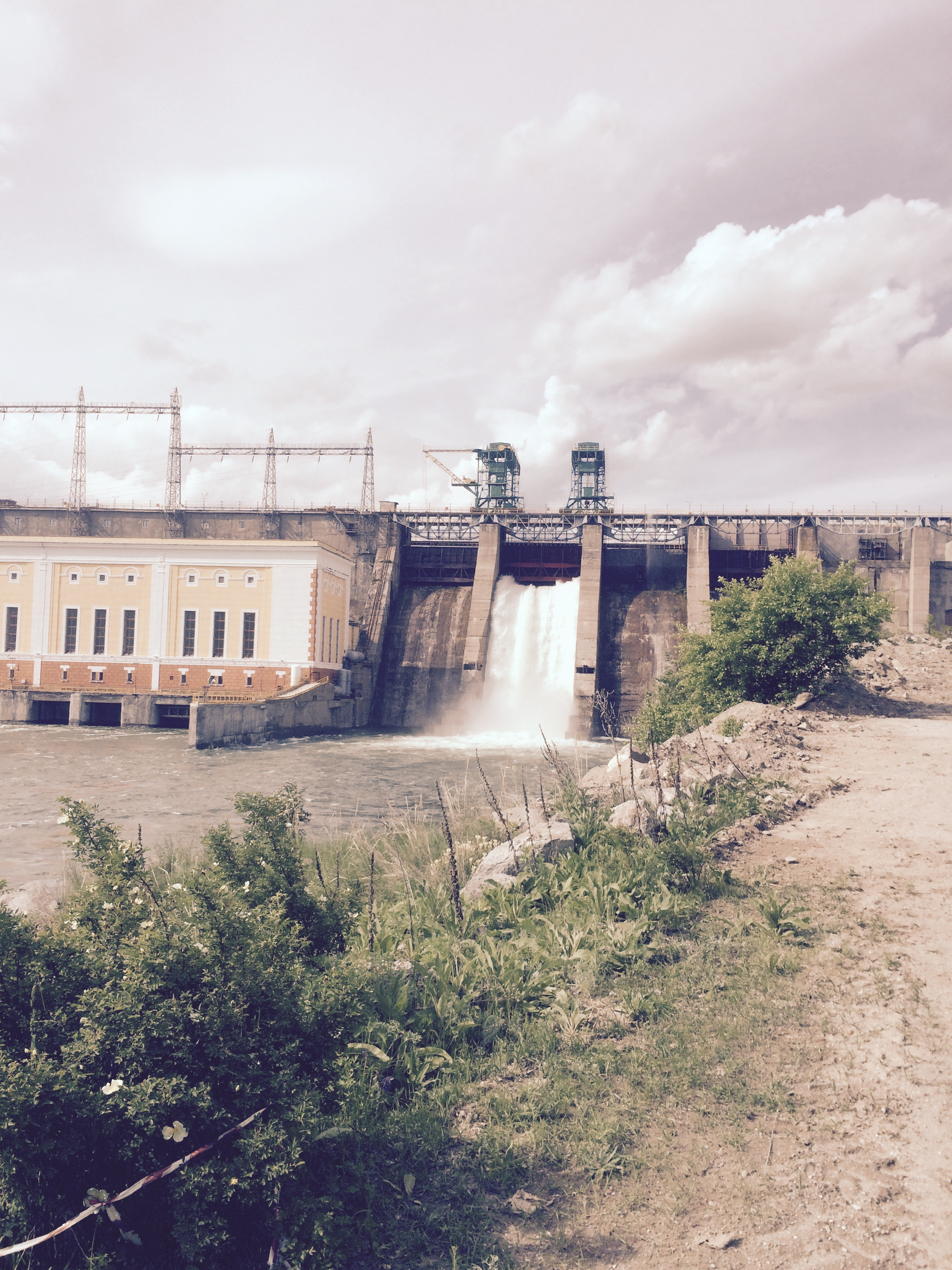
- Country: Kazakhstan
- Location: Oskemen
- Coordinates: 49°53′59″N 82°43′6″E
- Status: Operational
- Commission date: 1952, 1959
- Owner: Samruk-Energy

Thermal power station
- Primary fuel: Hydropower

Power generation
- Units operational: 4
- Nameplate capacity: 367.8 MW

External links
- Website: www.ukges.kz
- Commons: Related media on Commons

The Oskemen Hydroelectric Power Plant (Kazakh: Өскемен ГЭС, Óskemen GES), also known as Ust-Kamenogorsk Hydroelectric Power Plant (Russian: Усть-Каменогорская ГЭС), is a hydroelectric power plant on the Irtysh River near Oskemen in East Kazakhstan Province of Kazakhstan. It has 4 individual turbines with a nominal output of 82.8 MW (3 were renewed - 95 MW) with a generating capacity of 367.8 MW and generates 1.58 billion kilowatt-hours of electricity per year. In 1957, the former leader of the Soviet Union, Georgy Malenkov, was appointed as the manager of the power plant in the aftermath of a failed coup attempt. Formerly owned and operated by AES Corporation, in 2023 ownership was transferred to Samruk-Energy.

== See also ==
- List of power stations in Kazakhstan
