= Shengel'dy =

- Village
- Location in Kazakhstan
- Coordinates: 43°59′07″N 77°27′05″E
- Country: Kazakhstan
- Region: Almaty Region
- Time zone: UTC+6 (Omsk Time)

Shengel'dy is a village in Almaty Region, in south-eastern Kazakhstan.
