= Tykhon Cherniaiev =

Ukrainian chess player (born 2010)

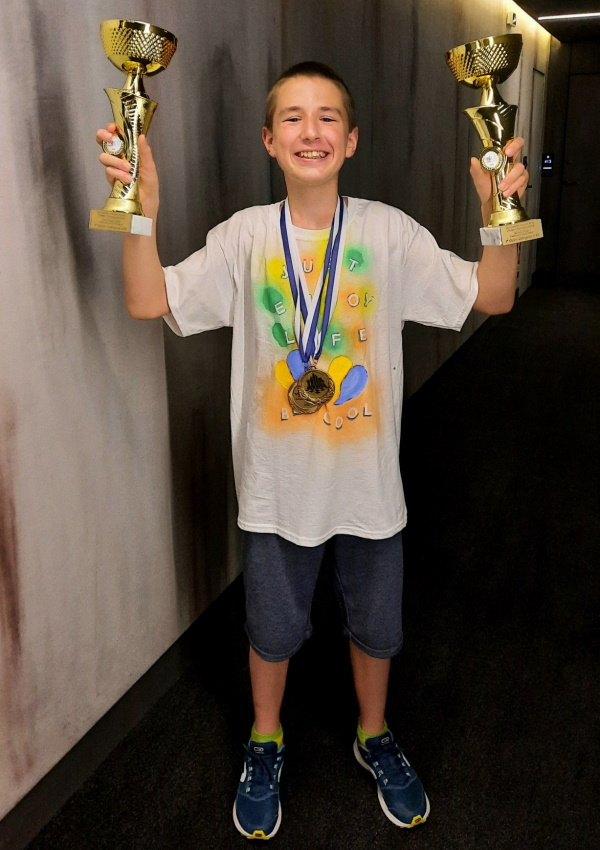
- Cherniaiev in 2022

Personal information
- Born: March 1, 2010 (age 16) Kharkiv, Ukraine

Chess career
- Country: Ukraine; Germany (2022–2023)
- Title: FIDE Master (2022)
- Peak rating: 2396 (November 2026)

Tykhon Serhiyovych Cherniaiev (Ukrainian: Тихон Сергійович Черняєв; born 1 March 2010) is a Ukrainian chess prodigy.

== Chess career ==
Cherniaiev started playing chess at the age of 3 years and 6 months.

He became the Ukrainian Chess Record holder at the age of 5 years, when he was able to fulfill the standard of the adult first rank in chess (Elo rating ≈ 1900).

At age of 6 years and 1 month, Cherniaiev received all three FIDE ratings: Standard – 1603, Rapid – 1992, Blitz – 2009.

In February 2017, at age 6, Cherniaiev was featured on TV Channel Ukraine as he took part in a simultaneous exhibition game that ended 4–0 in his favor.

In September 2017, at age 7, he achieved a 50% score in the Ukrainian under-18 championship.

On 28 May 2018, at the age of 8 years 88 days, he became the youngest to defeat an international master (IM) in a standard tournament game. This occurred in round 9 at the Ukraine Clubs Teams Championship in Chornomorsk, Odesa Oblast, when Cherniaiev defeated IM Alexey Maly (rated FIDE 2355 at that time). The previous record, which was held by Awonder Liang, was broken by 30 days.

In June 2018, at age 8 years and 4 months, Cherniaiev participated in the 2018 FIDE World Cadet rapid and blitz chess championship held in Minsk. While he was qualified to compete in the under-8 section, he chose to compete in the under-10 section for both the rapid and blitz events. Cherniaiev started as the top seed by 235 rating points in the rapid under-10 section and by 223 rating points in the blitz under-10 section. He won both events as well as two FIDE-recognized "World Champion" titles.

From September 2016 to November 2018, he was assisted by grandmaster (GM) Alexander Goloshchapov.

From December 2018 to December 2019, Cherniaiev trained with coach IM Pavel Sevostianov.

In March 2019, at age 9 years, he received his first official FIDE title, Arena Grand Master.

In May 2019, Cherniaiev became the winner of the 11th Ukrainian Award "Miracle Child 2019".

In August 2019, at the age 9 years and 5 months in Minsk, Belarus, Cherniaiev became a Vice World Champion in Rapid at the World Cadet Championships under-12 section.

From October 2019 to May 2020, Cherniaiev has been conducting joint streams with FM Mike Klein on the ChessKid.com website.

In February 2020 in Kramatorsk, Ukraine, at the age 9 years and 11 months, Cherniaiev became a Champion of Ukraine in Blitz at the Ukraine Chess Championship 2020, boys-U20.

In July 2021 in Kharkiv, Ukraine, at the age 11 years and 4 months, Cherniaiev became a Champion of the Kharkiv region among men in Blitz.

In January 2022, he received his second official FIDE title, Candidate Master.

In July 2022, he participated in the 21st European Youth Rapid and Blitz Chess Championship, U12 held in Thessaloniki. Without losing a single game in two events, he became a two-time European Chess Champion in Rapid and Blitz.

In November 2022, Cherniaiev received his third FIDE title, FIDE Master.

== Notable games ==
In February 2018, at age 7 years and 11 months, Cherniaiev won a 3-minute game against FIDE master Eduard Miller (FIDE rating 2334) in 23 moves.

In June 2018, at age 8 years and 3 months, he defeated GM Francisco Vallejo Pons (FIDE rating 2713) in a 10-minute game.

In February 2019, at age 8 years and 11 months, he won an informal 12-game internet blitz match against GM Mikhail Golubev with a score of 6½–5½ (+5−4=3).
