= Shulbinsk Hydroelectric Power Plant =

Hydroelectric power station in Kazakhstan

Shulbinsk Hydro Power Plant
- Country: Kazakhstan
- Location: Shulbinsk
- Coordinates: 50°24′0″N 81°4′15″E
- Status: Operational
- Commission date: 1987, 1994
- Owner: Samruk-Energy

Thermal power station
- Primary fuel: Hydropower

Power generation
- Units operational: 6
- Nameplate capacity: 702 MW

The Shulbinsk Hydro Power Plant (Шульбинская ГЭС) is a hydro power plant on the middle reach of the Irtysh River, 70 km up the stream from Semipalatinsk in East Kazakhstan Region of Kazakhstan. It has 6 individual turbines, which will deliver up to 702 MW of power and generates 1.66 billion kilowatt-hours of electricity per year. Formerly owned and operated by AES Corporation, currently owned by Samruk-Energy.

== See also ==
- List of power stations in Kazakhstan
