= Qonayev =

Capital city of Almaty Region, Kazakhstan

Qonaev Қонаев Kapchagay • Қапшағай • Konayev
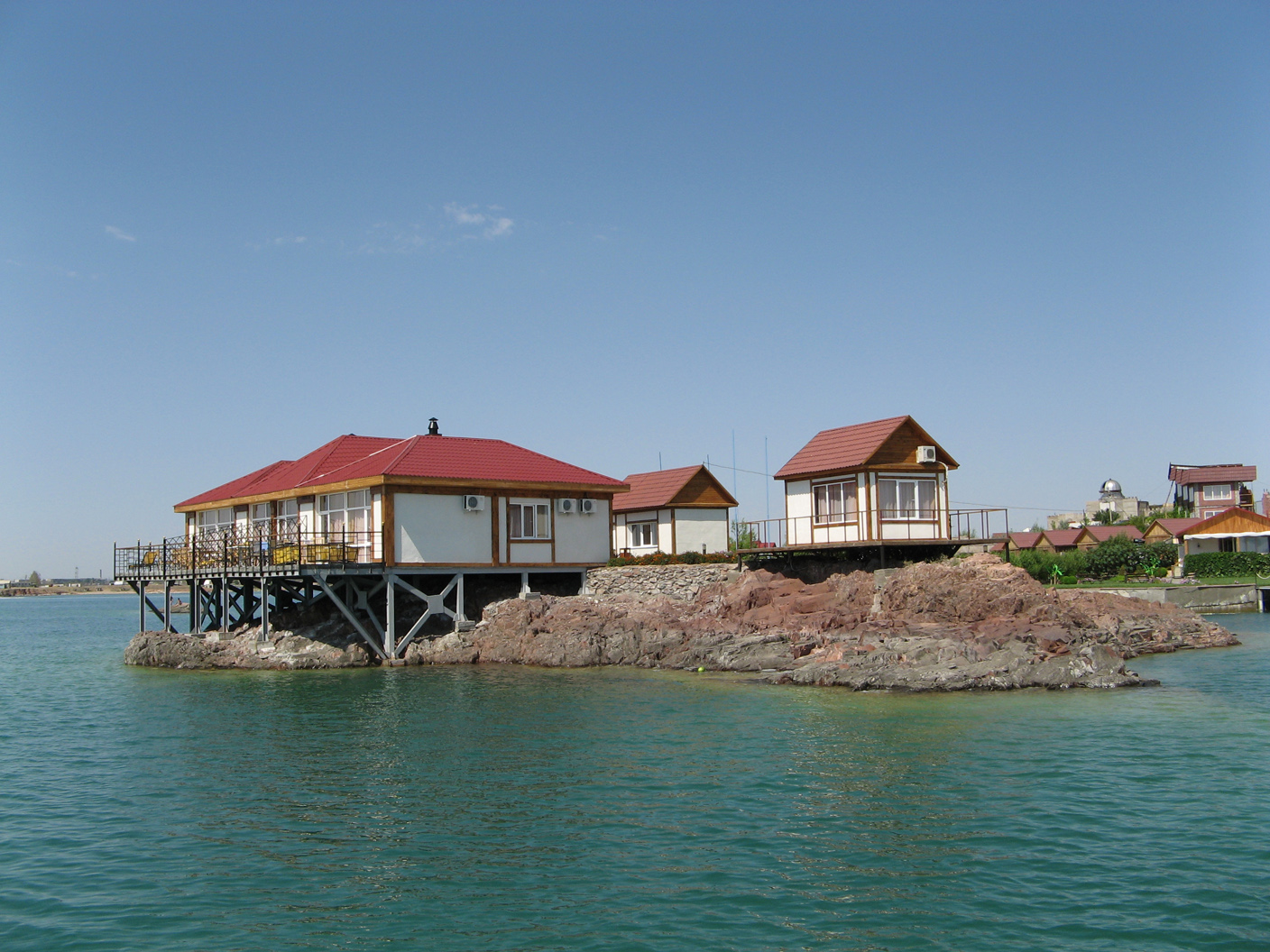
- On Lake Kapshagai

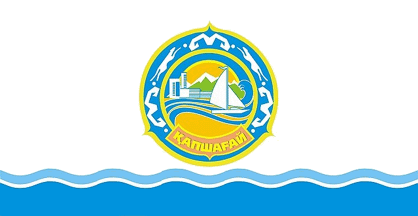
- Flag

- Location of Qonayev in Kazakhstan
- Coordinates: 43°53′0″N 77°5′0″E
- Country: Kazakhstan
- Region: Almaty Region

Government
  - Akim: Askhat Berdikhanov

Population (2021 census)
  - Total: 54,245
- Time zone: UTC+5 (Almaty Time)
- Area code: 72772

Qonaev (Kazakh: Қонаев [qoˈnɑjɪf]), also known as Konayev (Russian: Конаев) and by other names, is a city in southeastern Kazakhstan. It is the seat of government for the Almaty Region. The population was 39,855 (2009 census results) and 33,428 (1999 census results).

== Names ==
Qonaev is the Latin form of the Kazakh name Қонаев; Konayev is the romanization of the Russian name Конаев. Both derive from Dinmukhamed Kunaev, a former first secretary of the Communist Party of the Kazakh SSR during Soviet rule. The city was renamed in his honor on 17 March 2022.

The first Russian settlement in the area was Fort Ili or Iliysk (Russian: Илийск), named for the area's major river. During the construction of the Kapshagay (Russian: Капшагай), Kapchagay (Капчагай), or Qapşağai (Kazakh: Қапшағай, lit. 'Narrow Gorge') dam during the 1960s, the town was moved and renamed Novoiliysk (Russian: Новоилийск, lit. 'New Iliysk'). Following the dam's completion, Novoiliysk was renamed Kapshagay in its honor on 9 July 1970.

== Geography ==
Fort Ili was established by the Russians at the head of navigation on the Ili River for their river boats travelling upstream from Lake Balkhash. When the town of Iliysk that grew up around the fort was set to be flooded, the settlement was relocated to the planned western shore of the Kapshagay Reservoir. The present town is connected by railway with Almaty 76 km (47 mi) to its south.

=== Climate ===
Climate data for Qonaev (1991–2020)
Month	Jan	Feb	Mar	Apr	May	Jun	Jul	Aug	Sep	Oct	Nov	Dec	Year
Mean daily maximum °C (°F)	−2.1 (28.2)	1.1 (34.0)	10.2 (50.4)	19.3 (66.7)	25.2 (77.4)	30.6 (87.1)	32.7 (90.9)	31.9 (89.4)	26.1 (79.0)	17.6 (63.7)	8.1 (46.6)	0.7 (33.3)	16.8 (62.2)
Daily mean °C (°F)	−7.2 (19.0)	−4.3 (24.3)	4.0 (39.2)	12.3 (54.1)	17.9 (64.2)	23.1 (73.6)	25.3 (77.5)	24.0 (75.2)	18.2 (64.8)	10.3 (50.5)	2.4 (36.3)	−3.9 (25.0)	10.2 (50.4)
Mean daily minimum °C (°F)	−11.7 (10.9)	−8.8 (16.2)	−1.0 (30.2)	5.9 (42.6)	10.8 (51.4)	15.6 (60.1)	17.7 (63.9)	15.9 (60.6)	10.4 (50.7)	4.0 (39.2)	−2.1 (28.2)	−7.9 (17.8)	4.1 (39.4)
Average precipitation mm (inches)	18.5 (0.73)	18.1 (0.71)	24.3 (0.96)	36.3 (1.43)	39.1 (1.54)	32.4 (1.28)	34.1 (1.34)	14.8 (0.58)	12.8 (0.50)	24.9 (0.98)	29.1 (1.15)	21.2 (0.83)	305.6 (12.03)
Average precipitation days (≥ 1.0 mm)	4.9	4.9	5.5	6.7	6.6	5.4	5.3	3.3	2.4	4.6	5.4	5.3	60.3
Source: NOAA

== History ==
Fort Ili was established during the Russian Empire's conquest of Central Asia. It strengthened their control of the lower Ili, whose upstream valleys in present-day Xinjiang included the major settlement of Kulja (now Yining). The Ili Region was claimed by the Qing Empire but lost during the 1860s and 1870s Dungan Revolts, after which the entire area was occupied by the Russians until the 1881 Treaty of Saint Petersburg, which accepted Russian control of the area around Lake Balkhash.

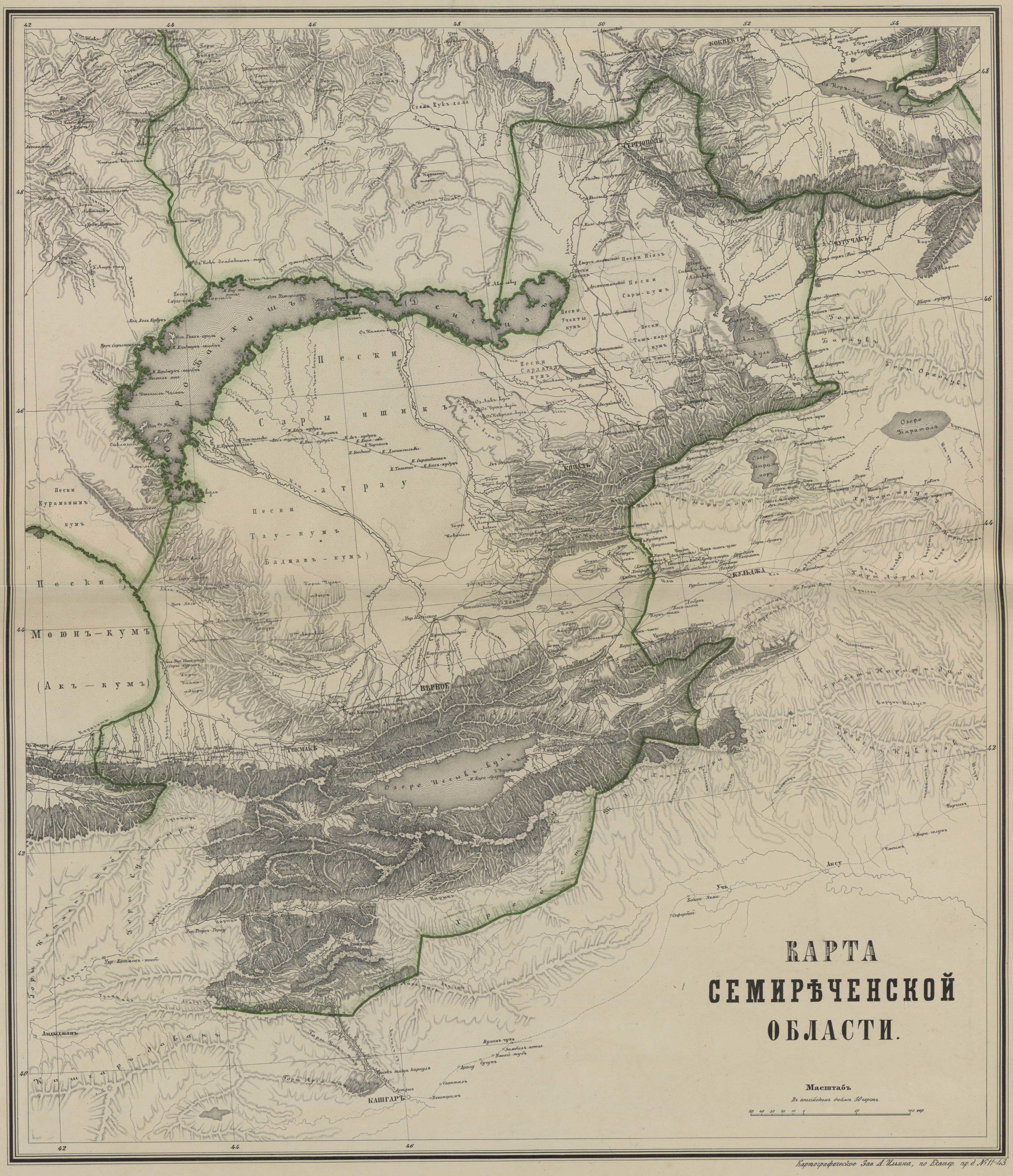
1871 Russian map of Semirichenskoy Oblast including the Ili and "Ft. Iliysskoe"

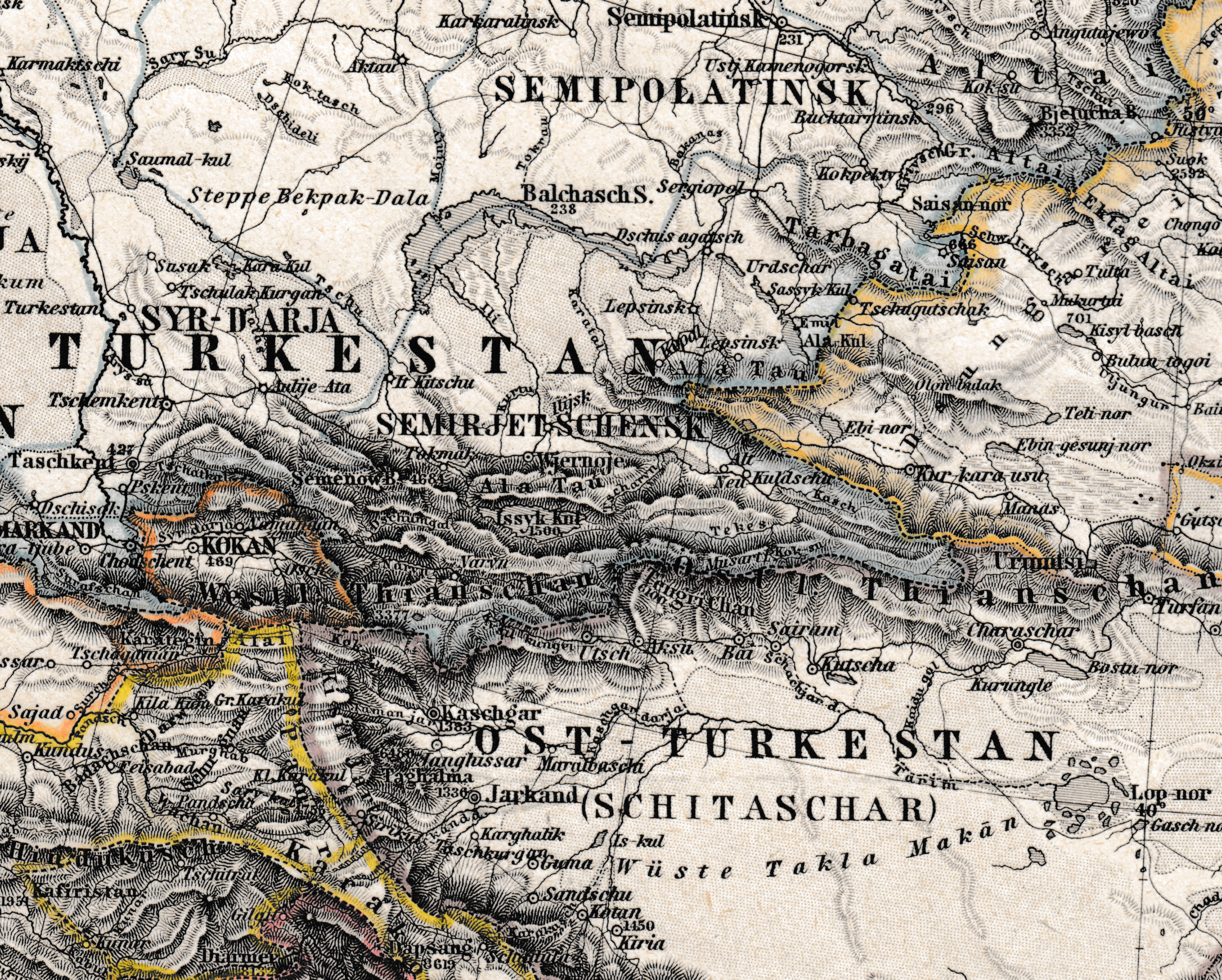
1874 German map of "Turkestan" including the Ili and "Ilijsk"

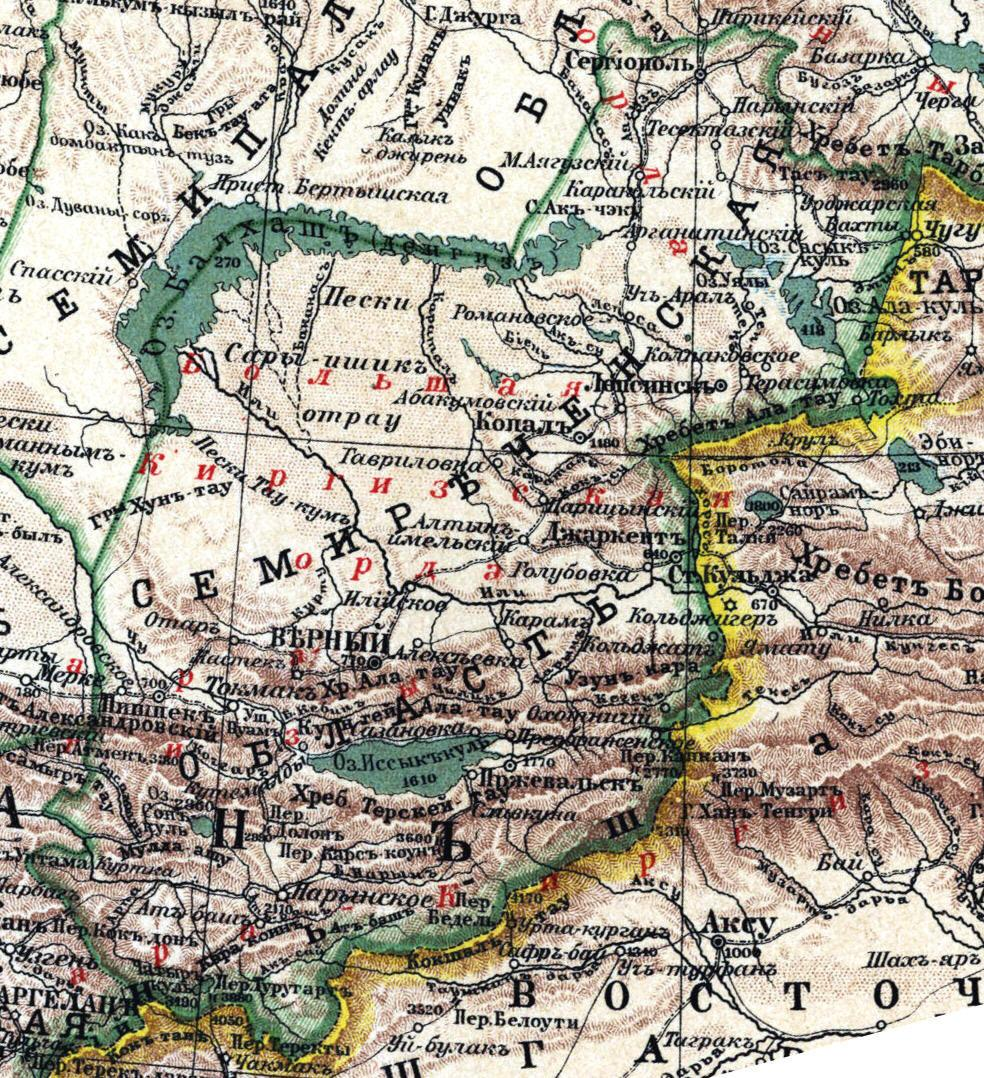
c. 1903 Russian map of Semirechenskaya including the Ili and "Iliyskoe"

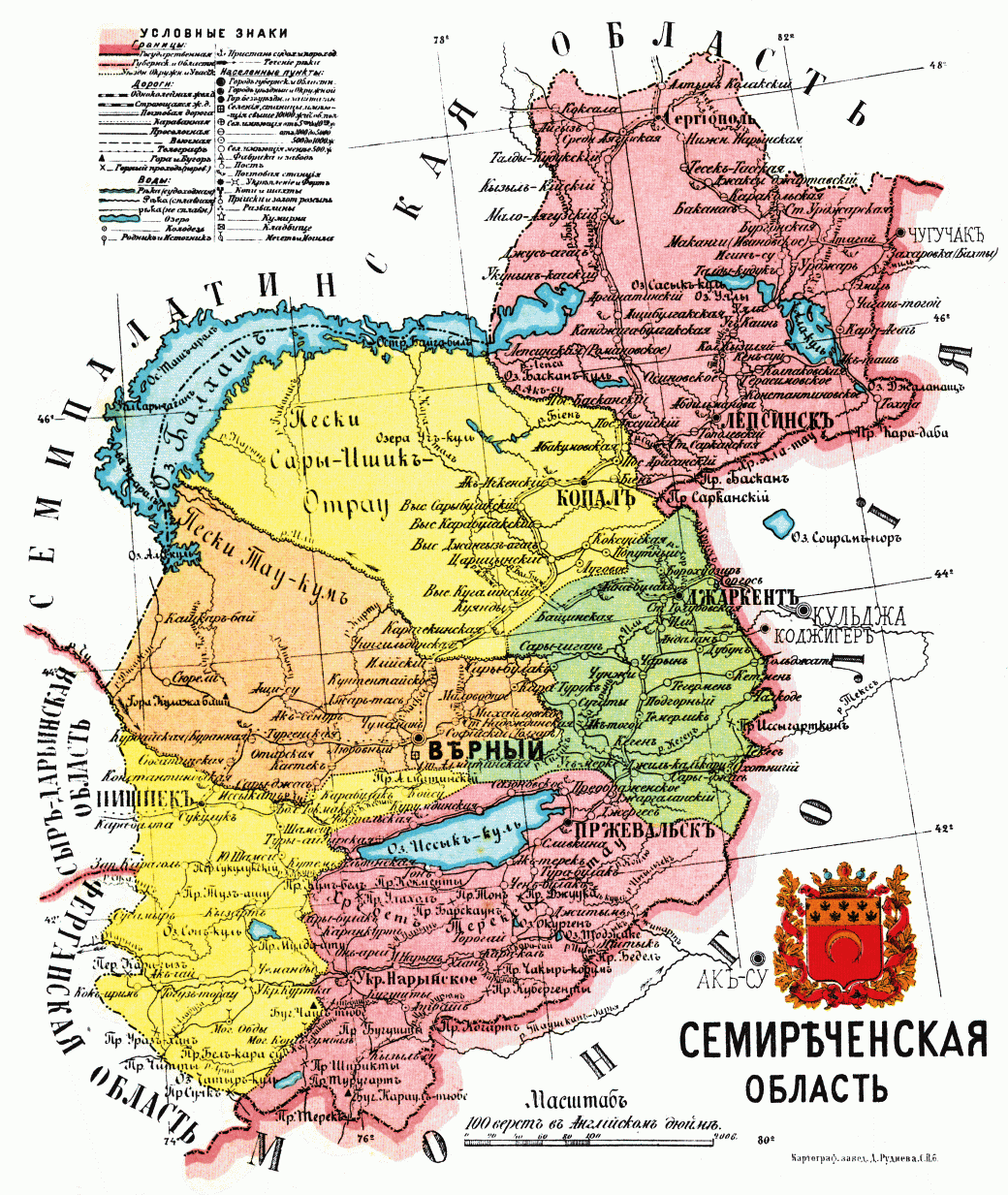
1913 Russian map of Semirechenskaya including the Ili and "Iliyskiy"

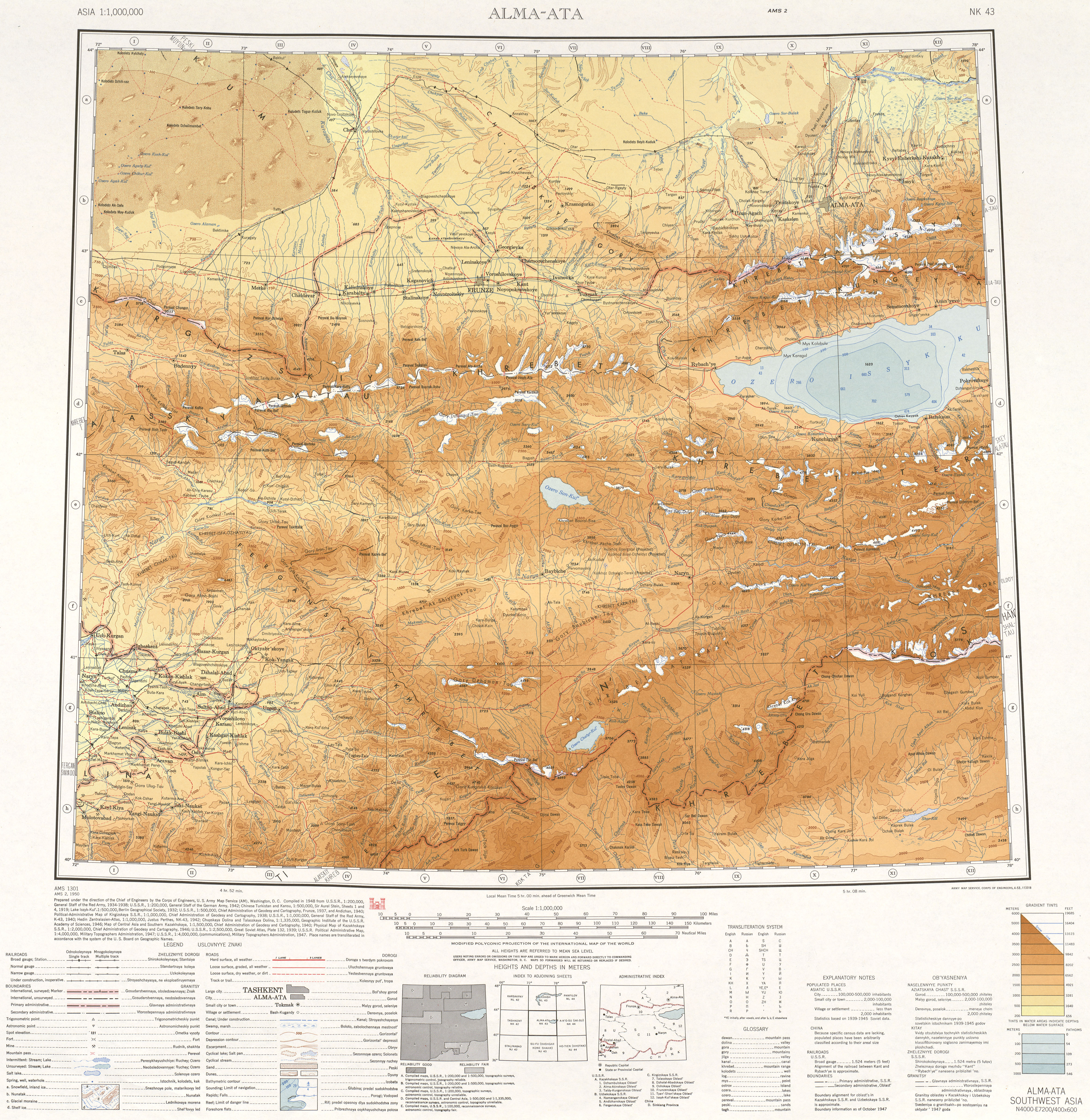
1948 US Army map of the region including the river and city "Ili"

Following the establishment of the Soviet Union, the area became part of the Kazakh SSR and was selected for a major hydroelectric project as part of Soviet industrialization and energy policy. The Kapchagay Dam was erected in the late 1960s, Iliysk's population being forced to relocate ahead of the creation of the Kapchagay Reservoir. The city was then renamed after the hydro project.

Many of Kapchagay's Russian inhabitants fled the city during the dissolution of the Soviet Union in the early 1990s, but its population saw a resurgence in the 2000s and has since returned to predissolution numbers. The city was renamed Qonaev and made the capital of Almaty Region on 17 March 2022 as part of Kazakh president Kassym-Jomart Tokayev's reforms. The former Almaty capital Taldykorgan was made the capital of the newly established Zhetysu Region.

Lake Kapchagay is now a popular weekend destination for tourists from Almaty.

== Administrative divisions ==
1. the city of Qonaev;
2. Zarechny rural district;
3. Shengeldinsky rural district.

== See also ==
- Kapchagay Reservoir
- Nurgisa 100 MW Solar Park
