= Bukhtarma Hydroelectric Power Plant =

Hydroelectric power station in Kazakhstan

Bukhtarma Hydroelectriс Power Plant
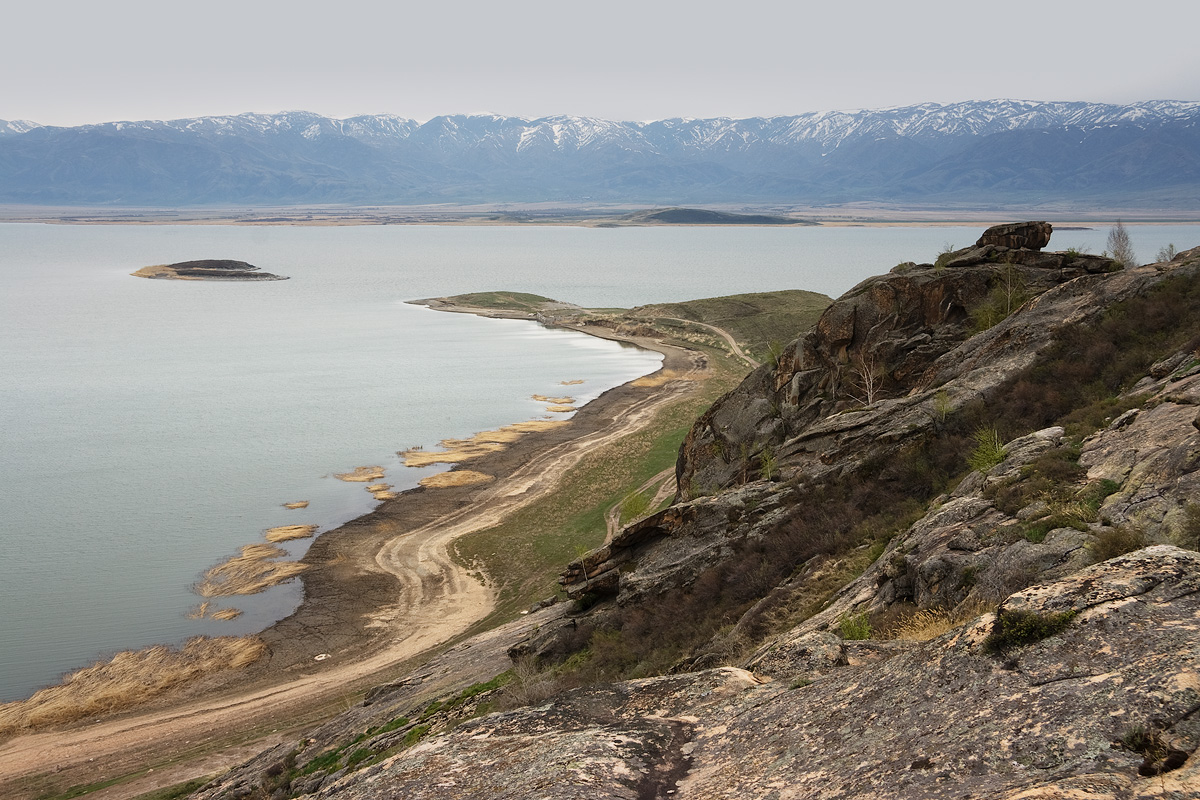
- The Bukhtarma Reservoir
- Country: Kazakhstan
- Location: Serebryansk
- Coordinates: 49°39′40″N 83°20′52″E
- Status: Operational
- Commission date: 1960, 1966
- Owner: Kazzinc

Thermal power station
- Primary fuel: Hydropower

Power generation
- Units operational: 9
- Nameplate capacity: 675 MW

The Bukhtarma Hydroelectric Power Plant (Note: Kazakh: Бұқтырма су электр стансасы, romanized: Būqtyrma su elektr stansasy; Russian: Бухтарминская ГЭС, romanized: Bukhtarminskaya GES) is a hydroelectric power plant on the Irtysh River 5 kilometres (3 mi) upstream of Serebryansk, East Kazakhstan. The plant has 9 individual turbines with a total generating capacity of 675 megawatts and generates 2.77 billion kilowatt-hours of electricity per year. The plant is operated by Kazzinc under a long-term concession. It is integrated into Kazakhstan's national electricity system and is used as a peak producer to regulate supply.

== See also ==
- List of power stations in Kazakhstan
