= Kapshagay Hydroelectric Power Plant =

Hydroelectric power plant in Almaty, Kazakhstan

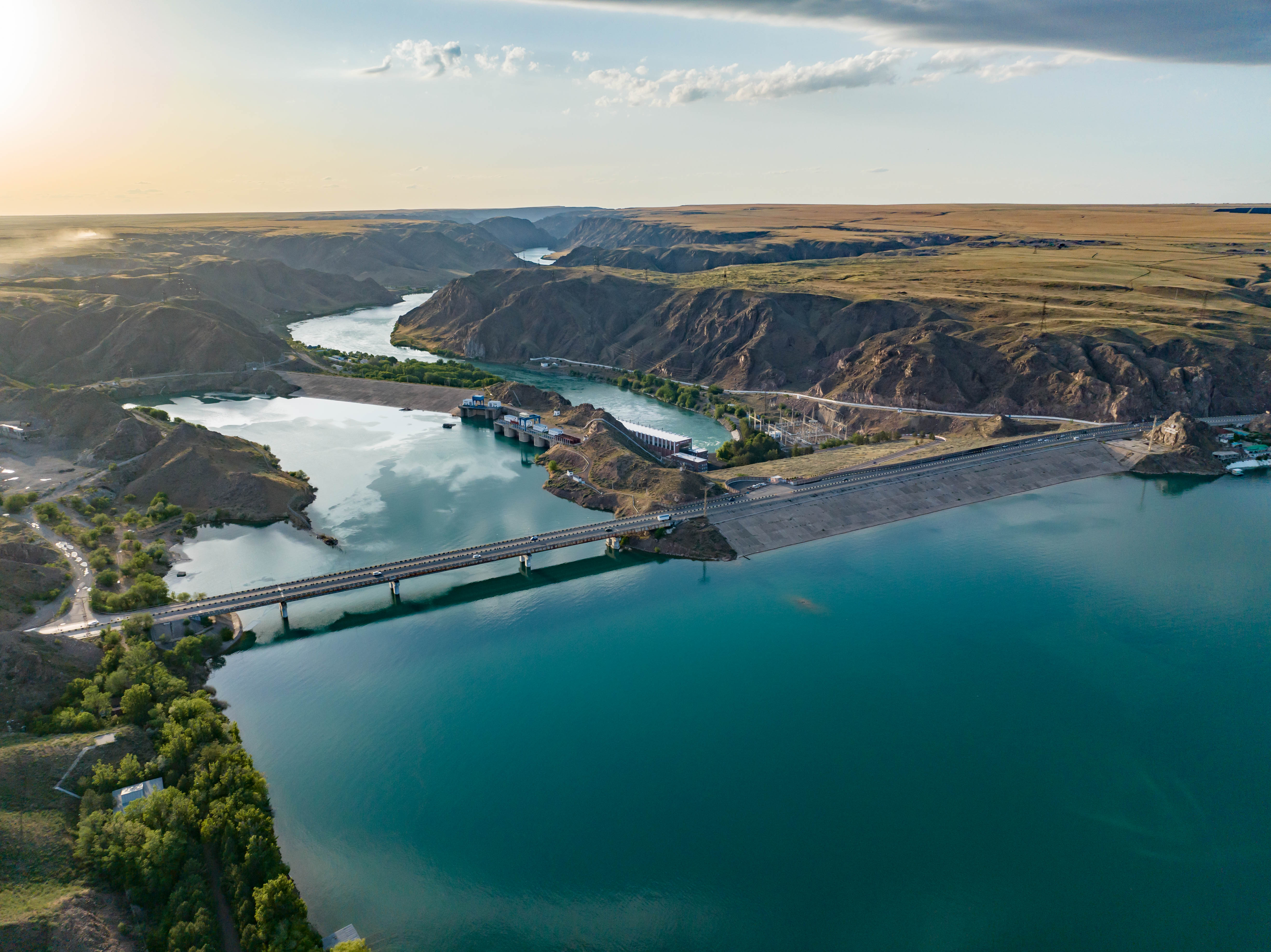
- Country: Kazakhstan
- Location: Kapshagay
- Coordinates: 43°55′22″N 77°05′53″E
- Status: Operational

Thermal power station
- Primary fuel: Hydropower

Power generation
- Units operational: 4
- Nameplate capacity: 364 MW

External links
- Commons: Related media on Commons

The Kapshagay Hydroelectric Power Plant (Kazakh: Қапшағай су электр станциясы, Qapshaǵaı sý elektr stantsııasy; Russian: Капшагайская ГЭС, earlier Капчагайская ГЭС) is a hydroelectricity power plant on the Ili River in Almaty Province of Kazakhstan. Constructed between 1965 and 1970, it has four individual turbines with a nominal output of around 91 MW which will deliver up to 364 MW of power and generates 972 million kilowatt-hours of electricity per year.

It is operated by Almaty Power Stations, and fed by Kapchagay Reservoir (resulting from the construction of Kapchagay Dam).
