= Kerbulak =

- Village
- Location in Kazakhstan
- Coordinates: 43°55′52″N 77°36′07″E
- Country: Kazakhstan
- Region: Almaty Region
- Time zone: UTC+6 (Omsk Time)

Kerbulak is a village in Almaty Region, in south-eastern Kazakhstan.
