= Aktogay Canyon =

- Location within Kazakhstan

Geography
- Country: Kazakhstan.
- State/Province: Almaty, Kazakhstan
- District: Enbekshikazakh
- Coordinates: 43°13′33″N 78°51′05″E
- Interactive map of Aktogay Canyon

Aktogay Canyon is located in the Zhalanash valley on the territory of Enbekshikazakh district of Almaty region. The Aktogay canyon is a continuation of the Charyn canyon. The canyon has a trapezoidal shape. The canyon reaches three kilometers wide and 200 to 300 meters deep. The canyon's name means "white stream" in translation from the Kazakh language. It is part of the Charyn National Park and is located within the territory of the Uygur District, Raiymbek District and Enbekshikazakh District (of the Almaty Province).

== Description ==
Aktogay Canyon, along with Charyn Canyon, belongs to the northeastern part of the Zailiyskiy Alatau as part of the Charyn River Valley. The river receives many tributaries from the northern slope of the Terskey Ala-too and Kungei Alatau Mountains and becomes a full-flowing river that cuts through the eastern parts of the Zhalanash depression and the Toraigyr mountains to form the canyon system.

The first scientific information about the geography of the Charyn River was described in the works of Pyotr Semyonov-Tyan-Shansky, "Three Merke rivers flowing through the plateau at their confluence into Sharyn dug through themselves so deep channels that the valleys of these rivers cut into the main plateau to a depth of 200 m. The united rivers broke through a stone ridge hidden under sediments at the bottom of the Sharyn valley. It forms in a deep gorge, at the confluence of the Merke rivers in Sharyn, beautiful and picturesque rapids and a noisy stream, known as Aktogoy, that is, the White Stream, from the fact that all of Sharyn’s water here turns into silver foam and water dust."

== Conservation ==
The canyon is part of the Charyn State National Natural Park, which was established on February 23, 2004.
