= List of national parks of Kazakhstan =

Kazakhstan has 13 national parks totalling 27,767 square km

#	Name	Photo	Location	Kazakh	Area (km2)	Year	Description
1	Altyn-Emel		Almaty Region; 44°20′N 78°26′E	List of national parks of Kazakhstan is located in Kazakhstan	4600	1996	The park covers about 4600 square kilometers between the Ili River and the Ak-Tau mountain range, near Lake Kapchagai, and consists mostly of desert and rocky terrain.
2	Bayanaul		Pavlodar Province; 50°49′N 75°40′E	List of national parks of Kazakhstan is located in Kazakhstan	684	1985	located in southeastern Pavlodar Province, 140 kilometers from the industrially developed city of Ekibastuz, on the outskirts of the Central Kazakh Uplands. The park was founded in 1985, making it Kazakhstan's first national park. It was created to preserve and restore the natural flora and fauna found in the Bayanaul mountain range.
3	Burabay		Akmola Region; 53°05′N 70°18′E	List of national parks of Kazakhstan is located in Kazakhstan	835	2000	Burabay covers a tract of low mountains and pine forests on the Kokshetau steppe of north-central Kazakhstan. The park combines resort facilities, ecotourism, and nature conservation.
4	Buiratau		Akmola Region; 51°20′N 73°20′E	List of national parks of Kazakhstan is located in Kazakhstan	890	2011	Preserves a unique transitional zone between dry steppe and semi-arid forest ecosystems of the Central Uplands of Kazakhstan.
5	Charyn Canyon		Almaty Region; 43°21′N 79°04′E	List of national parks of Kazakhstan is located in Kazakhstan	1251	2004	The park stretches along the Charyn River, including Charyn Canyon. The Canyon, with its thinly stratified red sedimentary rock, it is said to resemble the Grand Canyon in the US; it is however smaller - 50 km from end to end.
6	Ile-Alatau		Almaty Region; 43°05′N 77°5′E	List of national parks of Kazakhstan is located in Kazakhstan	2000	1996	It is situated in the Zailiysky Alatau (“raised mountains”), south of the city of Almaty between Gorge Turgen in the east and Chemolgan River in the west.
7	Karkaraly		Karaganda Region; 49°25′N 75°25′E	List of national parks of Kazakhstan is located in Kazakhstan	1121	1998	Covers a pine-forested 'mountain oasis' in the steppes of the Kazakh Uplands.
8	Katon-Karagay		East Kazakhstan Region; 49°10′N 85°36′E	List of national parks of Kazakhstan is located in Kazakhstan	6434	2001	The park fills the west side of the "X" where the borders of Kazakhstan, Russia, China, and Mongolia meet. The highest peak in Siberia (Belukha Mountain, 4,506 m (14,783 ft)), is on the Russian border in the Katun Range.
9	Kokshetau		Akmola Region; 53°15′N 68°26′E	List of national parks of Kazakhstan is located in Kazakhstan	1820	1996	Located in the transition zone between the Siberian taiga (to the north) and the southern steppes, the terrain is an "island" of forests, lakes, and mountains surrounded by steppe.
10	Kolsay Lakes		Almaty Region; 42°56′N 78°24′E	List of national parks of Kazakhstan is located in Kazakhstan	1619	2007	located on the north slope of the Tian Shan Mountains, southeast Kazakhstan (10 km from the border with Kyrgyzstan). Often referred to as "Pearls of Tien Shan", the park's main feature are the Kolsay Lakes located between the Raiymbek District and Talgar District of Almaty Region. The scenic Lake Kaindy is also within the park.
11	Sayram-Ugam		South Kazakhstan Region; 41°57′N 70°03′E	List of national parks of Kazakhstan is located in Kazakhstan	1490	2007	The park is a mountainous region of the Western Tian Shan Mountains, on the border with Uzbekistan. Ugam-Chatkal National Park of Uzbekistan is across the border, and Aksu-Zhabagly Nature Reserve of Kazakhstan is directly to the northeast along the border. It is particularly known for stands of juniper forests, and stands of fruit and nut trees.
12	Tarbagatai		East Kazakhstan Region; 47°17′N 81°50′E	List of national parks of Kazakhstan is located in Kazakhstan	1363	2018	Tarbagatai was established in 2018 to protect a region of mountain-steppe in East Kazakhstan that supports stands of wild fruit trees that have been isolated from genetic encroachment by commercial varieties.
13	Zhongar-Alatau		Almaty Region; 45°0′N 80°0′E	List of national parks of Kazakhstan is located in Kazakhstan	3560	2010	Also known as Jungar Alatau, or Dzungurian Alatau, the park was created in 2010 to protect the unique ecology of the Dzungarian Alatau, an isolated, glaciated mountain range in Kazakhstan, on the southeastern border with China.

== See also ==
- List of protected areas in Kazakhstan
