= European route E012 =

Road in trans-European E-road network

E012

Route information
- Length: 300 km (190 mi)

Major junctions
- From: Almaty
- To: Khorgas

Location
- Countries: Kazakhstan

Highway system
- International E-road network; A Class; B Class

E 012 is a European B class road in Kazakhstan, connecting the cities of Almaty - Kokpek - Chundzha - Koktal and Khorgas to the border of China.

== Route ==
- Kazakhstan
  - Almaty
  - Kokpek
  - Chundzha
  - Koktal
  - Khorgas
- China

It connects to E40, E125, E011, E013, China National Highway 312 and G30 Lianyungang–Khorgas Expressway.
