= Sharyn =

Sharyn may refer to:

- Sharyn (given name)
- Sharyn National Park in Kazakhstan
- Sharyn Canyon in Kazakhstan
- Sharyn River in Kazakhstan
