= Tuzkol, Raiymbek District =

Lake in Kazakhstan

Tuzkol
- Тұзкөл
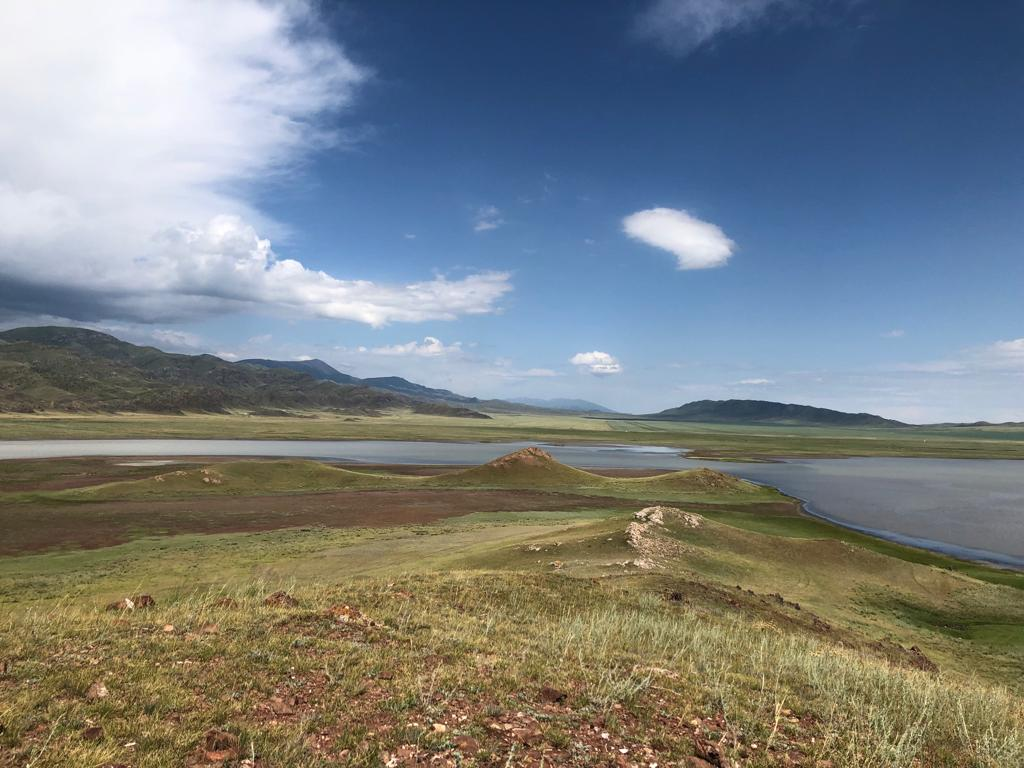
- View of the lake

- Location within Kazakhstan
- Location: Kegen Depression
- Coordinates: 43°00′N 79°58′E
- Type: salt lake
- Basin countries: Kazakhstan
- Max. length: 5.7 kilometers (3.5 mi)
- Max. width: 2.1 kilometers (1.3 mi)
- Surface area: 6.6 square kilometers (2.5 sq mi)
- Max. depth: 3 meters (9.8 ft)
- Residence time: UTC+6
- Shore length^{1}: 16.6 kilometers (10.3 mi)
- Surface elevation: 1,959 meters (6,427 ft)
- Islands: 1
- ^{1} Shore length is not a well-defined measure.

Tuzkol (Kazakh: Тұзкөл) is a high-altitude salt lake in Raiymbek District, Almaty Region, Kazakhstan.

The lake lies 70 kilometers (43 mi) east of Kegen, near the road to Narynkol. The nearest village is Karasaz, 14 kilometers (8.7 mi) to the WNW.

== Geography ==
Tuzkol is a lake located at 1,959 meters (6,427 ft) in the upper course of the Charyn river in southeastern Kazakhstan. It lies in the intermontane basin of the Eltchin-Buyryuk and Karatau ranges, north of the Tien Shan. The lake is shallow and its water is bittern salty, with a concentration that can become very high in certain seasons owing to high evaporation.

The lakeshore is flat and marshy and the bottom of the lake is muddy. The surrounding fields are a local livestock grazing area following the melting of the snows.

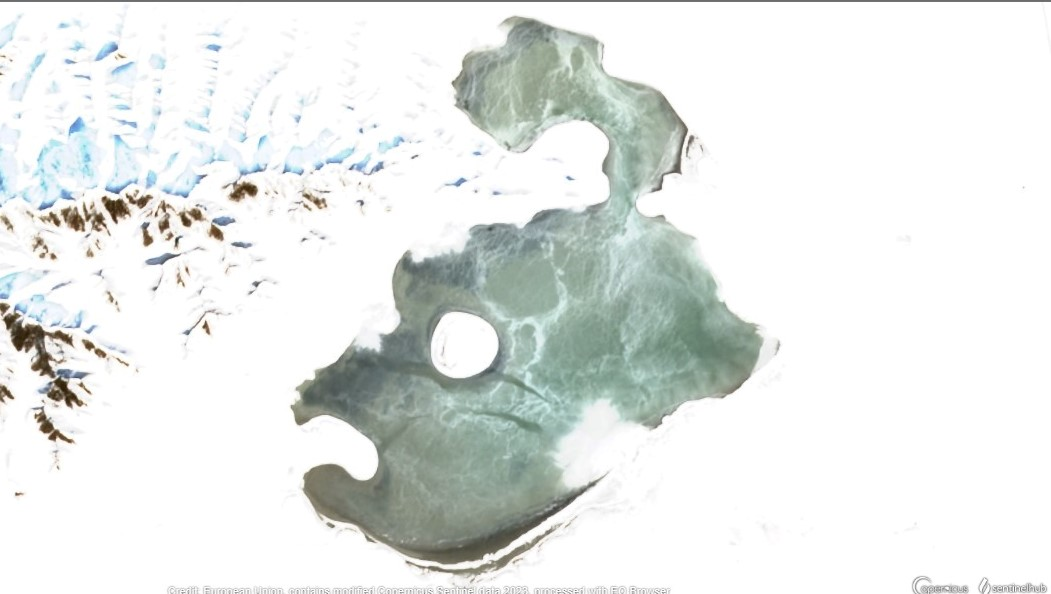
Sentinel-2 image of the lake in the winter.

== Flora and fauna ==
In some stretches reeds grow along the lakeshore. Tuzkol is a 3,194 hectares (7,890 acres) Important Bird Area for the breeding, migrating and wintering of a number of water bird species, including the ruddy shelduck and the common crane.

== See also ==
- List of lakes of Kazakhstan
