= Karasaz, Almaty Region =

Karasaz Қарасаз
- Village
- Location in Kazakhstan
- Coordinates: 43°02′46″N 79°52′53″E
- Country: Kazakhstan
- Region: Almaty Region
- District: Raiymbek District

Population (2009)
  - Total: 2,250
- Time zone: UTC+6 (Omsk Time)
- Postal code: 041412
- Area code: 72779

Karasaz (Kazakh: Қарасаз) is a village in Raiymbek District, Almaty Region, south-eastern Kazakhstan. It is the administrative center of the Karasaz rural district (KATO code - 195851100). Population: 2,250 (2009 census results); 2,685 (1999 census results).

== Geography ==
Karasaz lies 52 kilometers (32 mi) east of Kegen, near lake Tuzkol.
