= Autoroute 13 =

Autoroute 13 may refer to:

- A13 autoroute, in France
- Quebec Autoroute 13, in Quebec, Canada

== See also ==
- List of A13 roads
- List of highways numbered 13
