= E13 =

E13, E-13, E.13 or E 13 may refer to:

- E13, Error Thirteen, EOneThree - A technology consulting firm in Detroit, Michigan.
- HMS E13, a British submarine which saw service during World War I
- Aichi E13A, a type of Imperial Japanese Navy seaplane which saw service during World War II
- E13, a postcode district in the E postcode area
- European route E13, a road which runs through the United Kingdom
- Queen's Indian Defence, Encyclopaedia of Chess Openings code
- Tōhoku-Chūō Expressway, route E13 in Japan
- Kemuning–Shah Alam Highway, route E13 in Malaysia
