= Utah State Route 13 (disambiguation) =

State Route 13

Location
- Country: United States
- State: Utah

Highway system
- Utah State Highway System; Interstate; US; State; Minor; Scenic
← SR-12	→ SR-14

Utah State Route 13 may refer to:

- Utah State Route 13, a state highway in Box Elder County in northern Utah, United States
- Utah State Route 13 (1962-1977), the former state designation for a section of U.S. Route 89 in Cache and Rich counties in northern Utah, United States
- Utah State Route 13 (1912-1962), a former state highway in Millard and Sevier counties in central Utah, United States, most of which is also known as Clear Creek Canyon Road

== See also ==
- List of state highways in Utah
- List of highways numbered 13
