= Sherron =

Sherron is a given name. Notable people with the name include:

- Sherron Collins (born 1987), American former professional basketball player and coach
- Sherron Dorsey-Walker (born 1993), American professional basketball coach and former player
- Sherron Francis (born 1940), American artist known for abstract expressionist paintings
- Jane Sherron De Hart (born 1936), American feminist historian and women's studies academic
- Sherron Mills (1971–2016), American basketball player
- Sherron Walker (born 1956), American athlete
- Sherron Watkins (born 1959), American former Vice President of Corporate Development at the Enron Corporation
- Sherron Wilkerson (born 1975), American former professional basketball player

== See also ==
- Sharon
- Sharyn (given name)
