= Moinak Hydro Power Plant =

Hydropower plant in Almaty Province, Kazakhstan

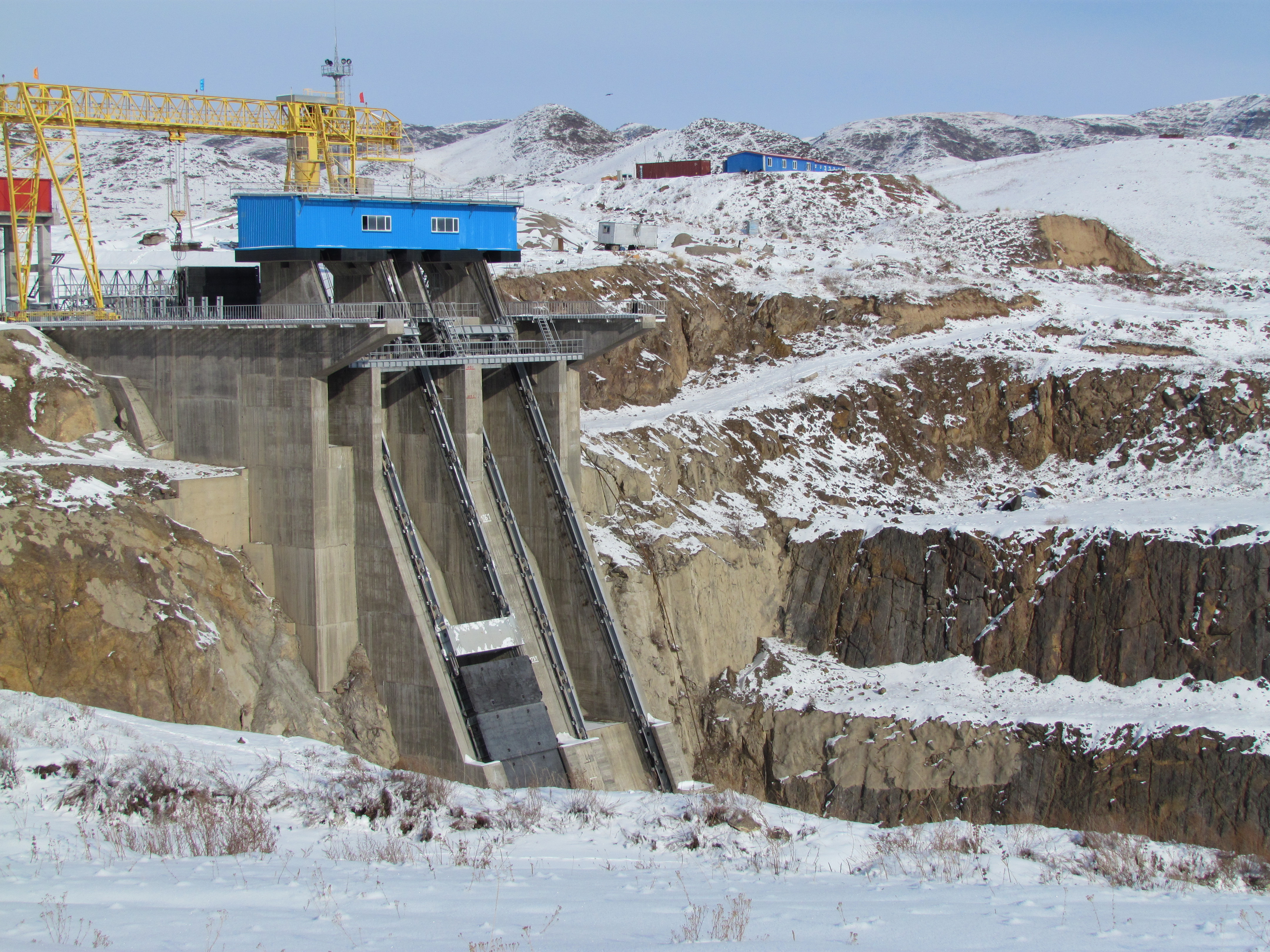
Moinak Hydro Power Plant

The Moinak Hydro Power Plant or (Moynak HPP) (Мойнақ СЭС-і, Moınaq SES-i) is a hydropower plant on the Sharyn River south of Almaty, Almaty Province, Kazakhstan ("Moinak HPP").

Moinak HPP is owned and operated by JSC Moinakskaya HPP, which is in turn owned by Samruk Energy JSC.

It was commissioned on December 9, 2011, and became fully operational in 2013. It has 2 individual turbines with a nominal output of around 150 MW which deliver up to 300 MW of power and generate 1.027 billion kilowatt-hours of electricity per year.

The main purpose of Moinak HPP is to function as a power source to cover peak load demands in the south Kazakhstan region.

- Installed capacity – 2X150 MW
- Annual average output – 1027 mln.kWh
- Parameters of Bestubinsk water reservoir
- FSL – 1770 m
- DSL– 1736 m
- Full reservoir capacity at FSL: 238 mln. m3
- Useful reservoir capacity– 198 mln. m3
- Downstream elevation – 1242, 5m
- Estimate discharge – 74, 0 m3/sec
- Calculated head – 471, 4 m

Moinak HPP is financed by Kazakhstan's and China's National Development Bank
