= Narynkol =

Narynkol Нарынқол
- Village
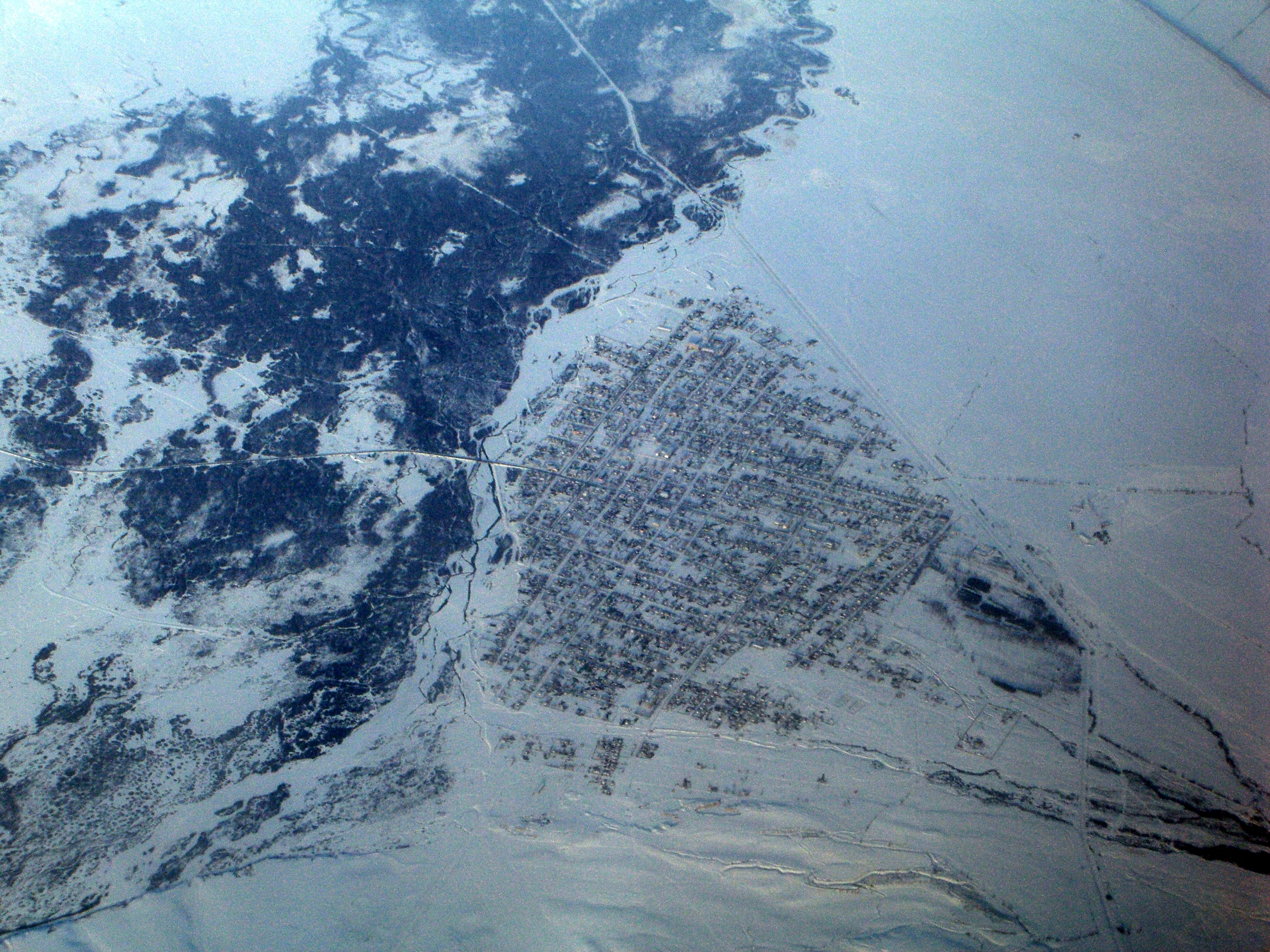

- Location in Kazakhstan
- Coordinates: 42°43′33″N 80°10′42″E
- Country: Kazakhstan
- Region: Almaty Region
- District: Raiymbek District

Population (2009)
  - Total: 7,731
- Demonym: Narynkoler
- Time zone: UTC+6 (Omsk Time)

Narynkol (Kazakh: Нарынқол, Narynqol) is a village in Raiymbek District of Almaty Region of Kazakhstan. It is the administrative center of Narynkol rural district. Narynkol is located near the border with China, about 82 km east-south-east (ESE) from Kegen, the administrative center of Raiymbek District. It lies at an altitude of 1801 meters above sea level.

== Population ==
In 1999, the village had a population of 8816 people (4371 men and 4445 women). According to the 2009 census, the village had a population of 7731 people (3806 men and 3925 women).

== Economy ==
It is the number one producer of livestock and crops in its agricultural area. The village pasture is filled with large grasslands, which is one of the main reasons for their success. The resulting animal products are the main source of livelihood for the population. Potatoes also make up a large portion of the Narynkoler economy.

In 1992, the Narynkol–Muzart border crossing with China was opened. It was hoped that a highway would be built over the Muzart Pass (Xiate Trail), creating a connection between Kazakhstan and the Tarim Basin. However, that never happened. The crossing was closed in 2008 as it lacked traffic.

== Climate ==
Narynkol has a humid continental climate (Köppen: Dfb), with mild summers and very cold winters.

Climate data for Narynkol (1991–2020)
Month	Jan	Feb	Mar	Apr	May	Jun	Jul	Aug	Sep	Oct	Nov	Dec	Year
Mean daily maximum °C (°F)	−4.3 (24.3)	−2.0 (28.4)	4.7 (40.5)	14.1 (57.4)	18.4 (65.1)	21.7 (71.1)	23.7 (74.7)	23.6 (74.5)	20.1 (68.2)	12.9 (55.2)	4.6 (40.3)	−1.9 (28.6)	11.3 (52.3)
Daily mean °C (°F)	−11.9 (10.6)	−9.0 (15.8)	−1.5 (29.3)	7.0 (44.6)	11.2 (52.2)	14.5 (58.1)	16.3 (61.3)	15.6 (60.1)	11.8 (53.2)	5.0 (41.0)	−2.5 (27.5)	−9.2 (15.4)	3.9 (39.0)
Mean daily minimum °C (°F)	−17.6 (0.3)	−14.6 (5.7)	−6.6 (20.1)	0.8 (33.4)	4.8 (40.6)	8.2 (46.8)	9.7 (49.5)	8.5 (47.3)	4.4 (39.9)	−1.4 (29.5)	−7.6 (18.3)	−14.5 (5.9)	−2.2 (28.0)
Average precipitation mm (inches)	11.3 (0.44)	12.5 (0.49)	21.4 (0.84)	38.4 (1.51)	51.7 (2.04)	61.5 (2.42)	62.0 (2.44)	45.0 (1.77)	31.2 (1.23)	31.3 (1.23)	23.9 (0.94)	13.1 (0.52)	403.3 (15.88)
Average precipitation days (≥ 1.0 mm)	3.5	3.7	5.8	7.4	9.5	11.5	11.2	7.9	6.0	5.6	5.0	3.8	80.9
Source: NOAA
