= European route E011 =

Road in trans-European E-road network

E011

Route information
- Length: 200 km (120 mi)

Major junctions
- From: Kokpek
- Kegen
- To: Tyup

Location
- Countries: Kazakhstan; Kyrgyzstan

Highway system
- International E-road network; A Class; B Class

E 011 is a European B class road in Kazakhstan and Kyrgyzstan, connecting the cities Kokpek - Kegen – Tyup

== Route ==
- Kazakhstan
  - A 6: Kokpek – Kegen – border of Kyrgyzstan
- Kyrgyzstan
  - ЭМ-08 ЭМ-08 Road: Border of Kazakhstan - Sary-Tologoy - Tüp
