= Charyn Canyon =

Canyon in Kazakhstan

- Sharyn Canyon
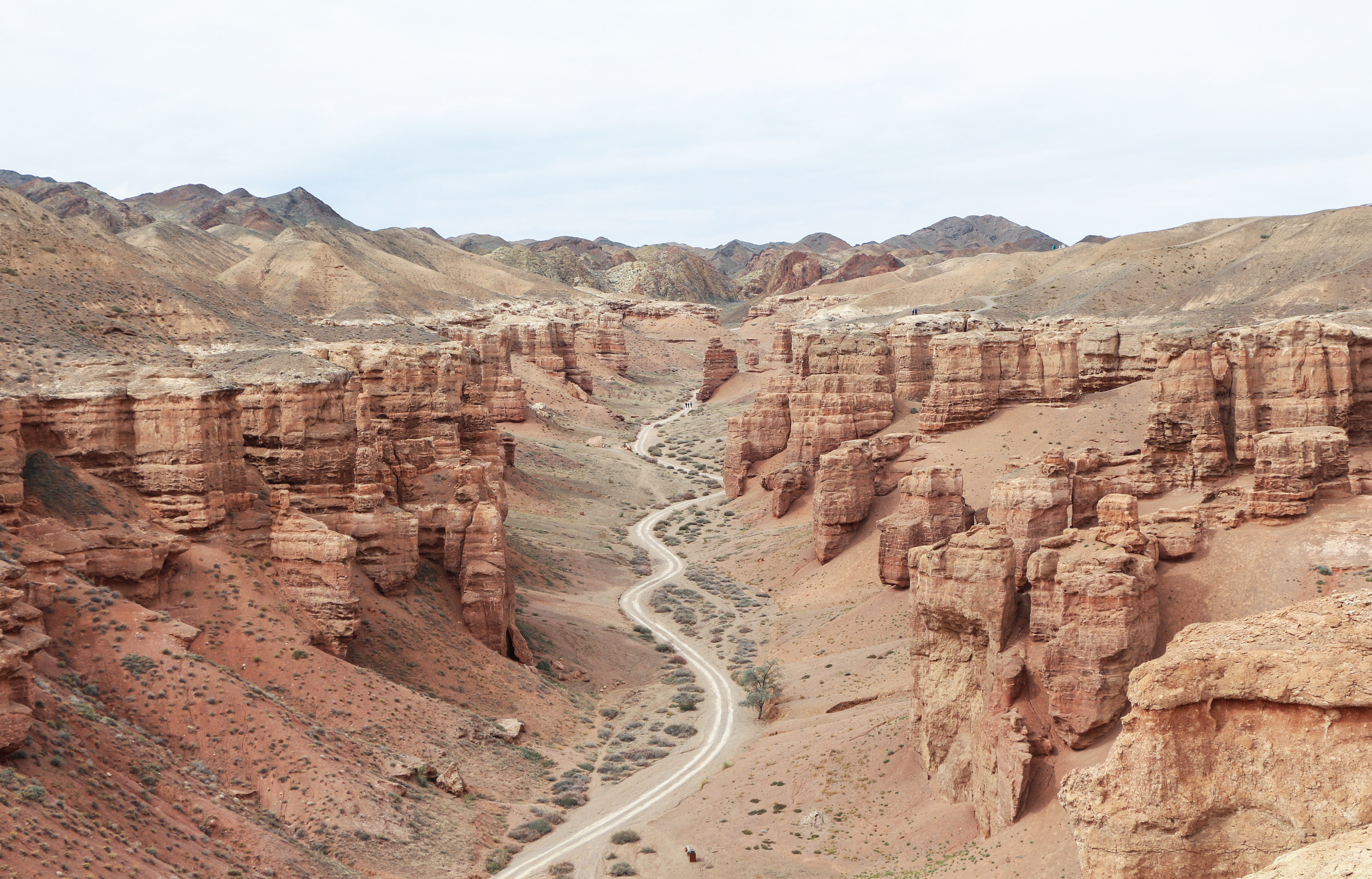
- Valley of Castles

- Location within Kazakhstan
- Floor elevation: 300 metres (980 ft)
- Length: 154 kilometres (96 mi)

Geography
- Location: Almaty, Kazakhstan
- Coordinates: 43°21′29″N 79°05′33″E
- Rivers: Sharyn River
- Interactive map of Charyn Canyon

Charyn Canyon (Russian: Чарынский каньон, Charynskiy kan'on), also known as the Sharyn Canyon (Kazakh: Шарын шатқалы, Sharyn shatqaly) is a canyon on the Charyn River in Kazakhstan. It is located about 200 km (120 mi) east of Almaty, close to the Kazakh–Chinese border. The canyon is roughly 154 km (96 mi) in length. It is part of the Charyn National Park established on 23 February 2004 and is located within the territory of the Uygur, Raiymbek, and Enbekshikazakh Districts of the Almaty Region. The canyon features many formations formed by the weathering of sedimentary rock. Though it is much smaller than the Grand Canyon, it has been described as being equally impressive.

== Features ==
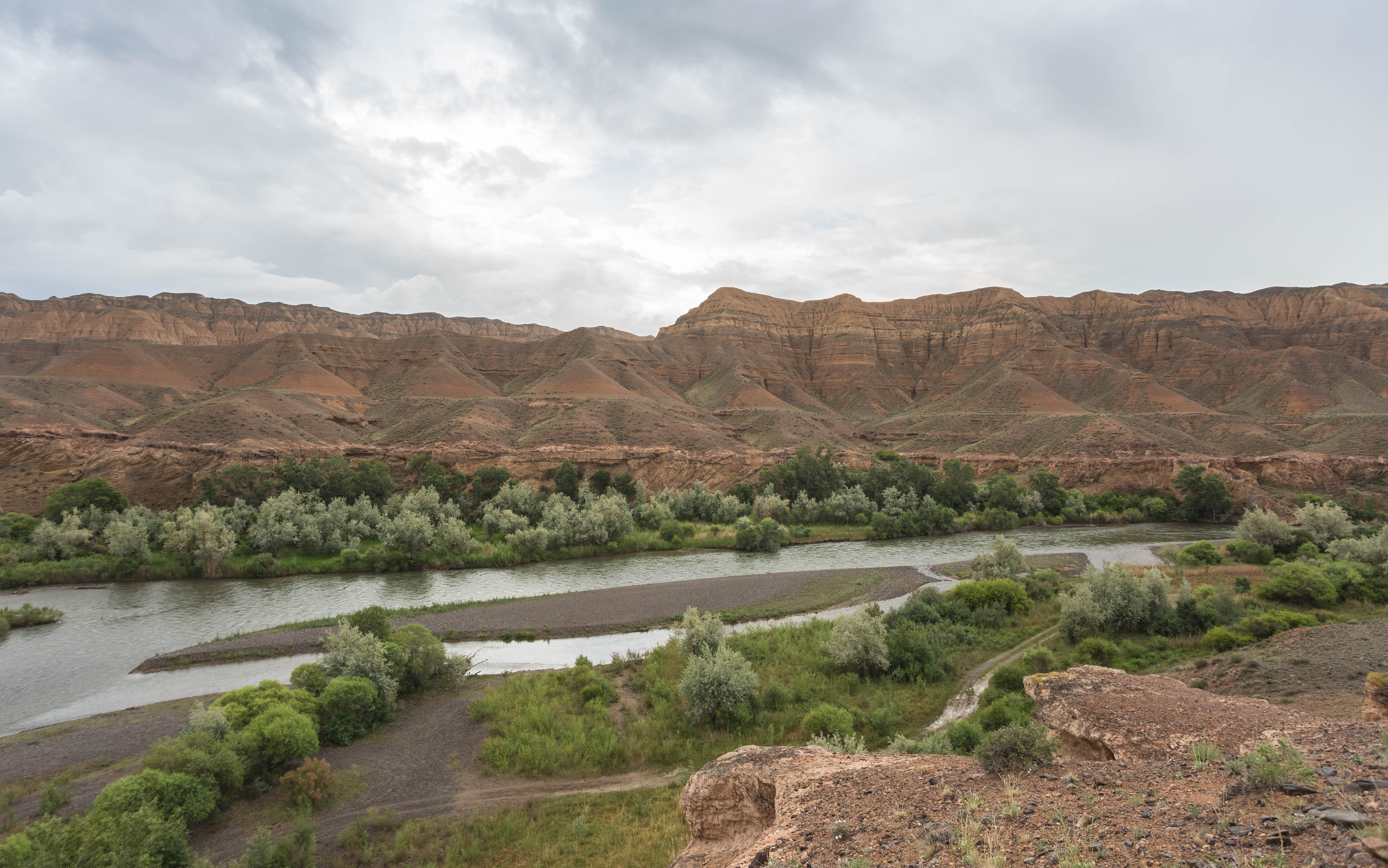

The canyon consists of a formation along the banks of the Charyn River of approximately 80 kilometres (50 mi) (90 kilometres (56 mi) is also stated). The river has a total length of 393 kilometres (244 mi). The river originates from the Tian Shan mountains that range over the arid semi-desert to eastern Almaty. In various places, it attains a depth of 150 to 300 metres (490 to 980 ft).

The Charyn Canyon consists of 5 different canyons: the Valley of Castles (the most popular part of the Charyn Canyon), the Temirlik Canyon, the Yellow Canyon, the Red Canyon and the Bestamak Canyon. There are also a number of smaller canyons or tracts, including the Kurtogay Canyon and the Tazbas tract.

The geological formation of the canyon consists of sedimentary red sandstone that has been subject to the "atmogenic process", defined as "atmospheric origin by condensation, wind action, or deposition from volcanic vapors". This water and wind erosion has resulted in rock formations which resemble colourful sculptures. One section of the canyon is known as the Valley of Castles (Dolina Zamkov) for its unusual rock formations.

The Relic Forest is located approximately 20 kilometres (12 mi) away from the canyon. The forest, located in the shadow of the canyon, is known as the "Sogdian ash" (a tree that is said to be a derivative from the ice age). The site is considered unique on various accounts. It was declared a protected reserve in 1964. It is now integrated with the Charyn National Park. Apart from the Sogdian ash, other trees in the area include the willow, poplar, and barberry. The area can be accessed from a road originating at Almaty that passes through Kokpek, Shonzy and Zharkent.

The canyon can be accessed from Almaty on the main road that passes through the villages Shelek, Baiseit, and Kokpek (at a distance of about 190 kilometres (120 mi)). From there, a signposted road leads to the parking area of the canyon over a distance of 9 kilometres (5.6 mi) and passes through the Sharyn (or Charyn) National Park. From the parking area, there is a track that leads to the canyon. Another path from the park, 1 kilometre (0.62 mi) in length, leads to an area with more scenic views of the canyon.

=== Temirlik tract ===
The Temirlik is a tract and natural environmental object. The Canyon of Temirlik River within a band of foothills of a mountain river Charyn included in a protected area of Saranskiy National Park formed in 2004. The protection of the object is by the administration of the Charyn state unitary enterprise. On the territory of this object was a huge lake before. The foothill plain of the Ketmen range is composed of rocks that are deposits of red clay mixed with crushed stone and remnants of rocks that exposed by the Temirlik River, the right tributary of the Charyn. ("Temir" – from Turk - iron.) The Temirlik River originates in the peaks of the Ketmen range (from Kazakh - Ketpen-a chain of high mountains (in the East of Almaty region). The other name of the ridge is Uzynkara, which is translated as "long mountain" from Kazakh language. At this point, the river is relatively wide, shallow and calm. There are some species of prehistoric flora and fauna — Sogdian ash in the valley of the Charyn River (Sharyn), one of the largest left tributaries of the Ili River. The current shape of the gorge developed about a million years ago.

A canyon up to one and a half kilometers wide and a gorge up to 160 meters deep represent the middle part of the Temirlik River. The length of the tract is 11 km. There are canopies, narrow slits, corridors, niches everywhere on the slopes of the gorge. The picturesque canyon with pillars, winding corridors, and crevices is very similar to its "older brother", the Charyn canyon, and the green strip is tightly framed by red rocks of low rock formations makes an extraordinary impression and creates a picture of a colorful wild corner of nature. The scientist, naturalist, entomologist and writer P. I. Marikovsky called the Temirlik tract Nightingale Canyon for the songs of nightingales that can be heard in the area. Marikovskiy assumed that in the tract lived people who found and processed iron ore.

== Tourism ==
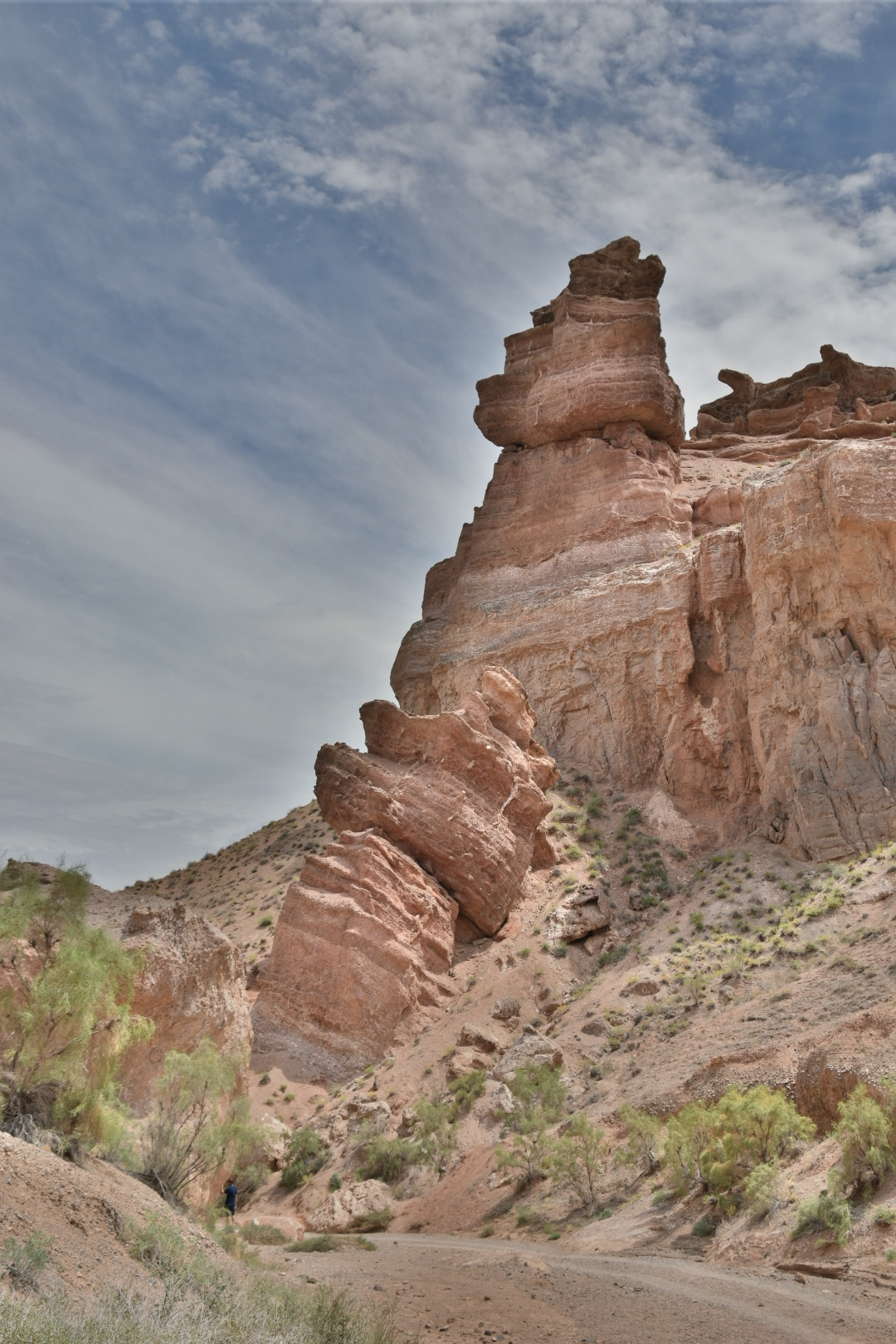
Charyn Canyon in summer

Popular adventure sports activities in the river include whitewater rafting and canoeing. Fishing for a local species of fish called "Naked Osman" is also common. There is a track at the valley of the gorge that has naturally sculpted red stone formations.

In May 2021, the Kazakh Ministry of Ecology, Geology, and Natural Resources announced that efforts will be made to develop tourism in the Charyn Canyon region with an emphasis on historical heritage as well as ecotourism.

In 2021, the Chair of the Kazakh National Geographic Society, Orman Nurbayev, along with project manager Zhanibek Alkeev, announced the addition of eco-toilets, gazebos, shade awnings, drinking fountains, and observation decks to the Charyn Canyon tourism area.

== Scientific research ==
In 2021, German researchers from the Max Planck Institute for Chemistry analysed samples from the canyon, producing a five-million-year "unbroken" geological record of rainfall and climate change in the region. This data is being hailed as invaluable for climate research.

== Protection ==
The natural monument is protected by both the state and Charyn National Park, holding the status of a natural conservation and scientific institution.

=== Gallery ===
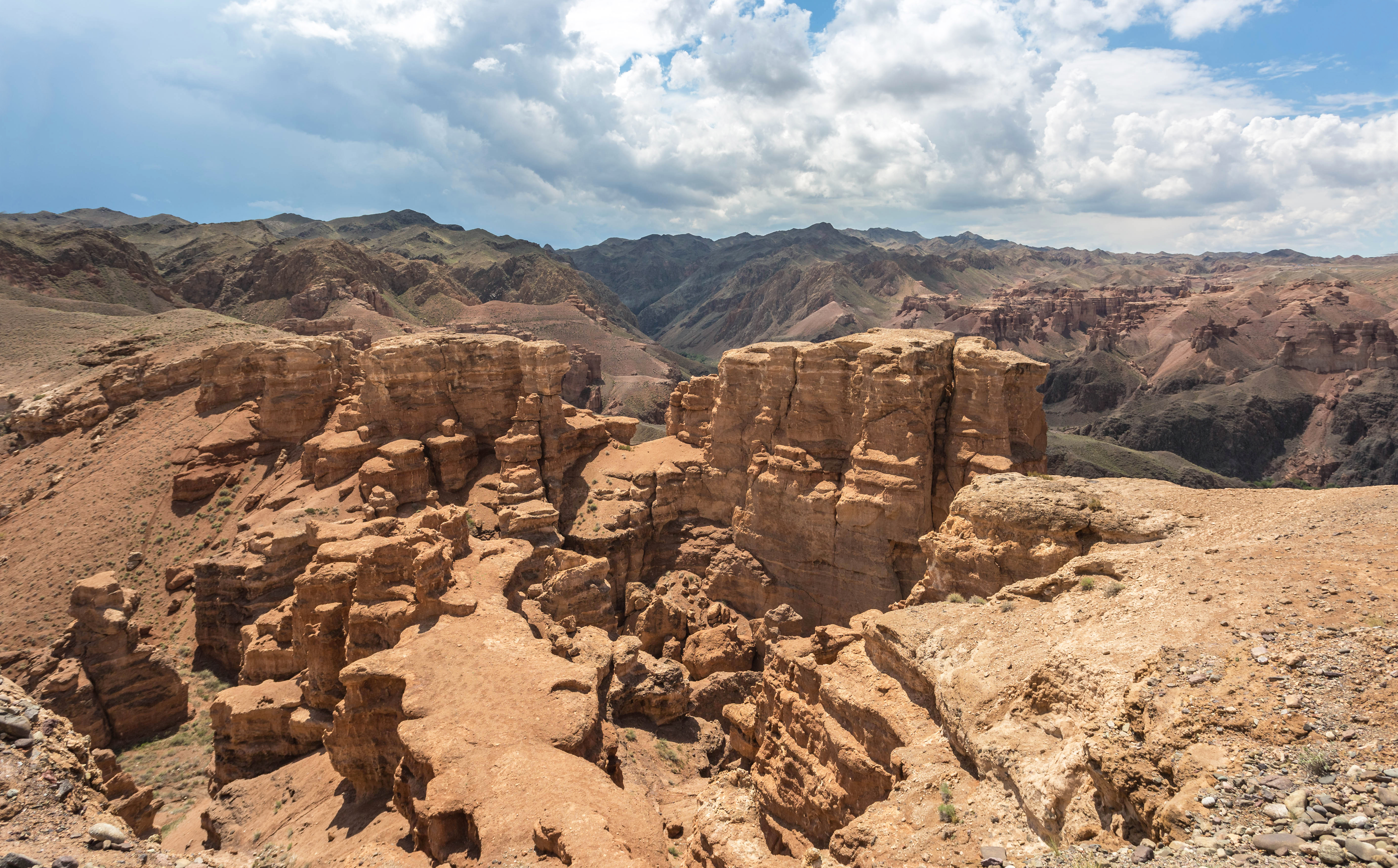

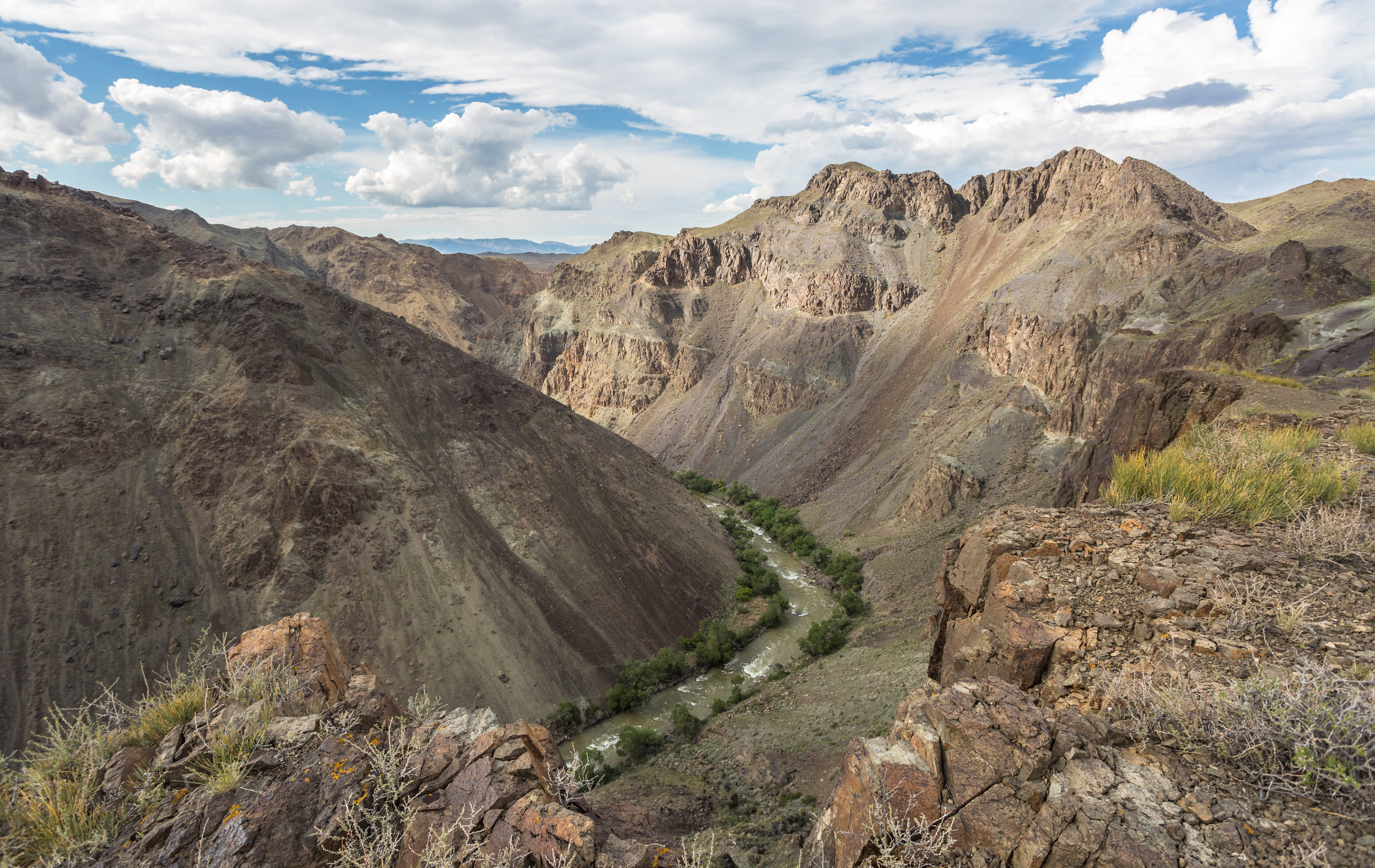

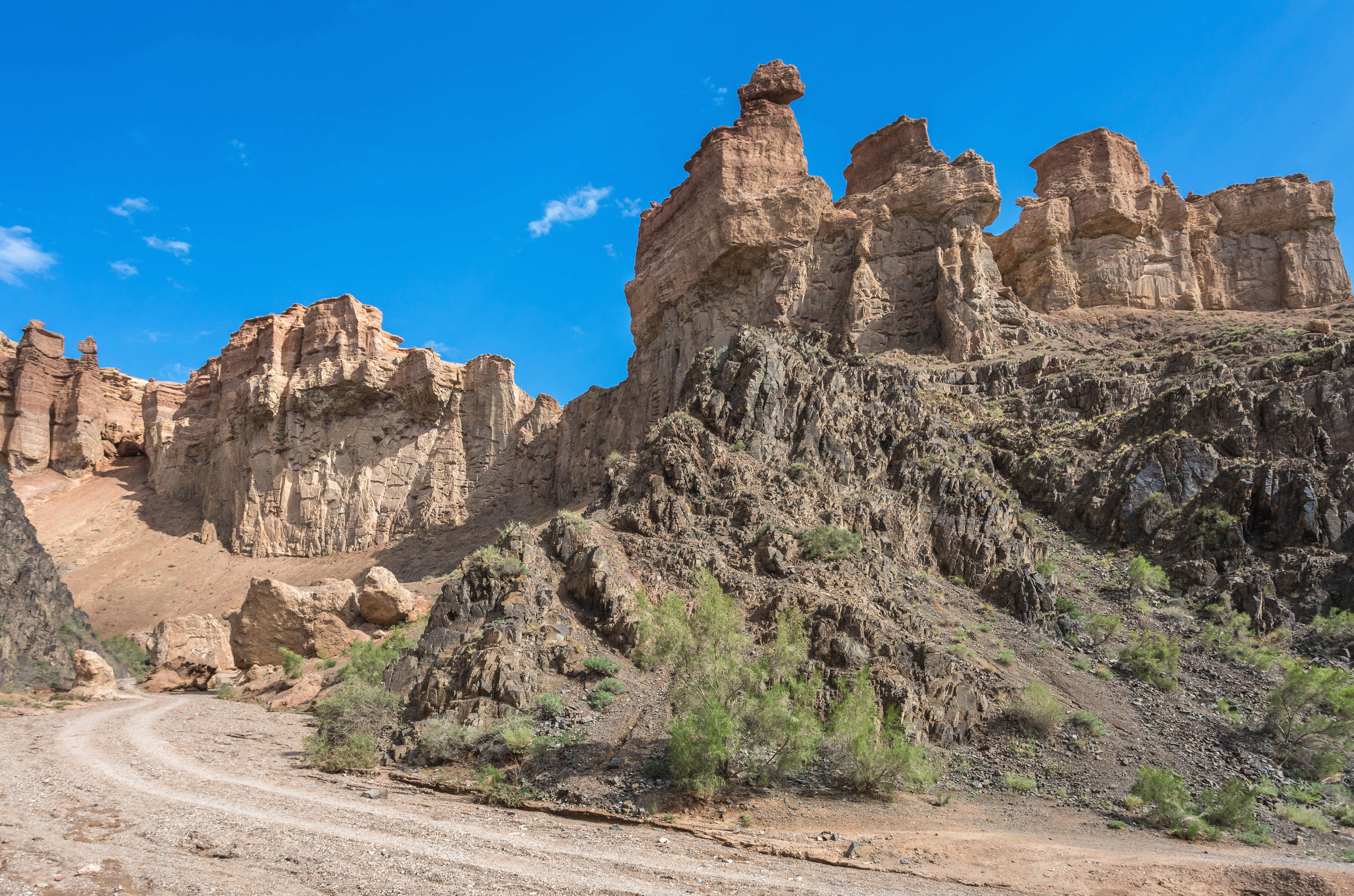

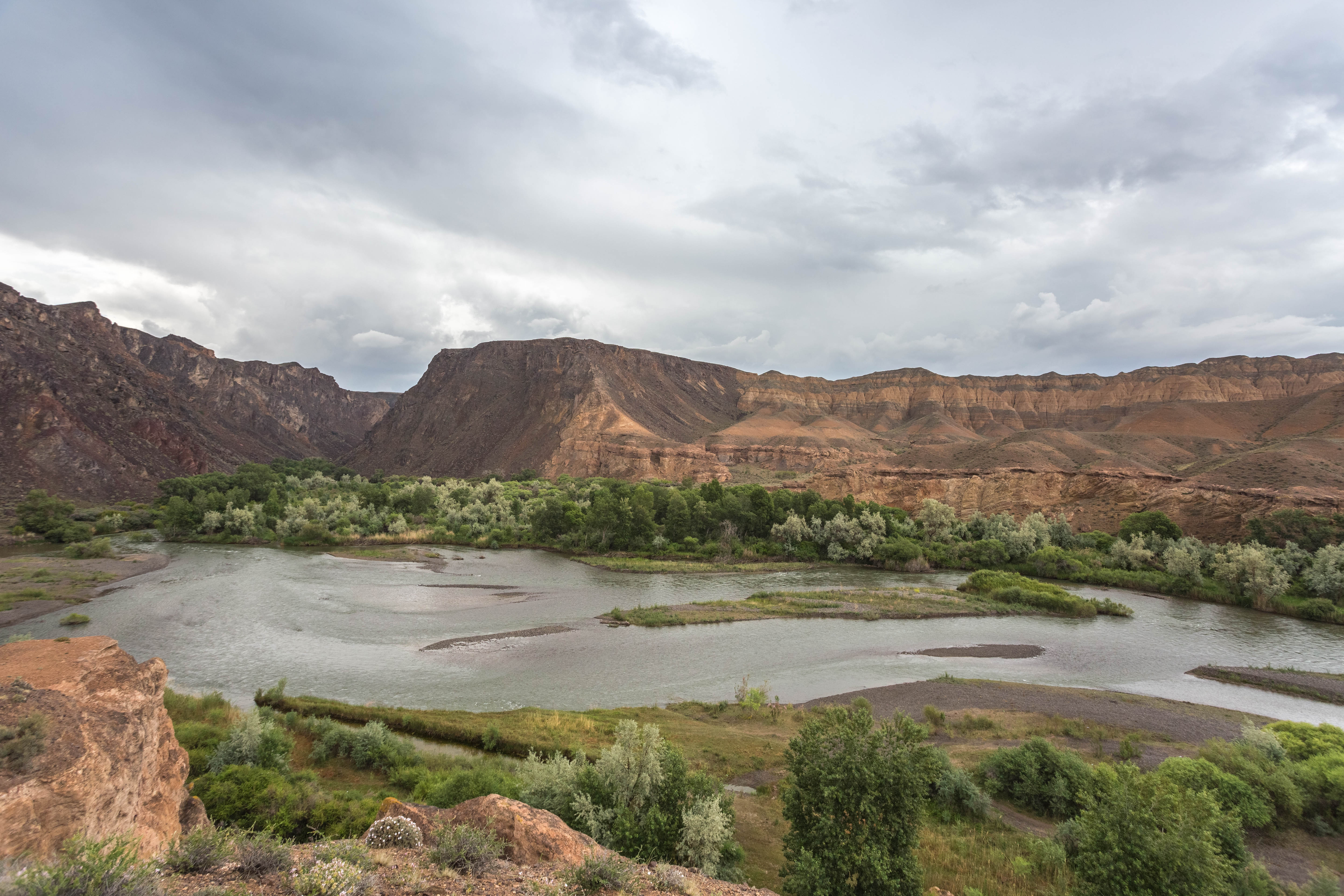

=== Bibliography ===
- Brummell, Paul (1 March 2012). Kazakhstan. Bradt Travel Guides. ISBN 978-1-84162-369-6.
- Mayhew, Bradley; Bloom, Greg; Clammer, Paul (2010). Central Asia. Lonely Planet. p. 147. ISBN 978-1-74179-148-8.
- Waters, Bella (2006). Kazakhstan in Pictures. Twenty-First Century Books. p. 72. ISBN 978-0-8225-6588-8.
