= European route E013 =

Road in trans-European E-road network

E013

Route information
- Length: 178 km (111 mi)

Major junctions
- From: Sary-Ozek
- To: Koktal

Location
- Countries: Kazakhstan

Highway system
- International E-road network; A Class; B Class

E 013 is a European B class road in Kazakhstan, connecting the cities Sary-Ozek - Koktal.

== Route ==
- Kazakhstan
  - Sary-Ozek
  - Koktal
