= Tarbagatai National Park =

National park in Urjar District, Abay Region, Kazakhstan

- Kazakh: Тарбағатай ұлттық паркі
- IUCN category II (national park)
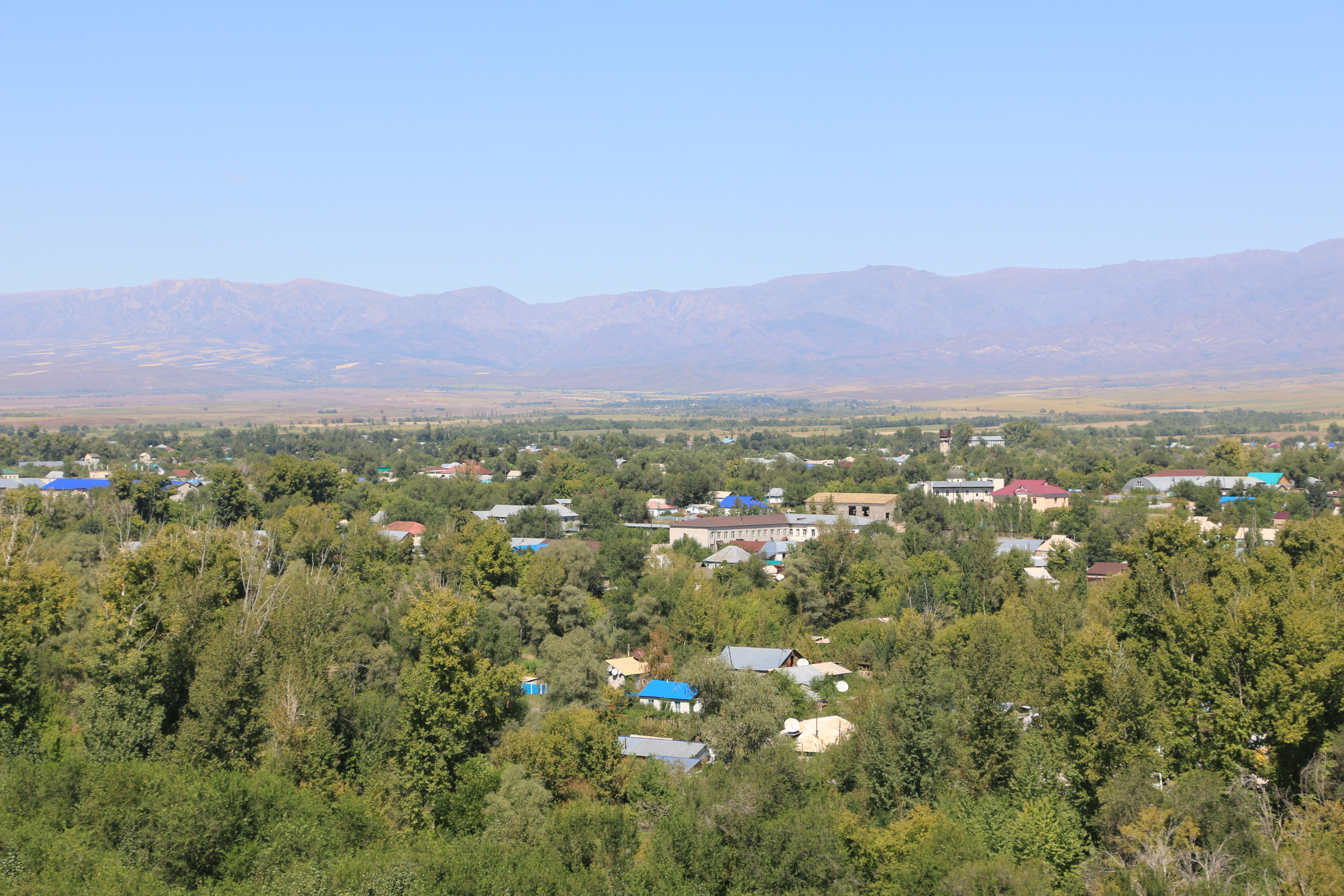
- Tarbagatai National Park, along the mountain ridge in the background above Urzhar

- Location within Kazakhstan
- Location: East Kazakhstan Region
- Nearest city: Urzhar
- Coordinates: 47°17′N 81°50′E
- Area: 136,367 hectares (336,970 acres; 1,364 km^{2}; 527 sq mi)
- Established: June 27, 2018
- Governing body: Ministry of Agriculture of the Republic of Kazakhstan

Tarbagatai National Park (Kazakh: Тарбағатай ұлттық паркі, Tarbağatai ūlttyq parkı), also Tarbagatay, was established in 2018 to protect a region of mountain-steppe in East Kazakhstan that supports stands of wild fruit trees that have been isolated from genetic encroachment by commercial varieties.

== Topography ==
The Tarbagatai Mountain range runs west-to-east for about 250 km, starting about 70 km southeast of the regional city of Ayagoz. The main body of the park runs along the south slope of the ridge. Additional clusters cover areas of the Karabas Mountains, Arkaly Mountains, and valleys of the Urzhar and Emel rivers.

== Climate and ecoregion ==
The climate of Tarbagatai is Humid continental climate, warm summer (Köppen climate classification (Dfb)). This climate is characterized by large seasonal temperature differentials and a warm summer (at least four months averaging over 10 °C (50 °F), but no month averaging over 22 °C (72 °F).

== Flora and fauna ==
The region is one of high biodiversity, with over 1,600 species of vascular plants identified, 270 of birds, 19 of fishes, 23 of reptiles, and 80 species of mammals.

== See also ==
- List of national parks of Kazakhstan
