= List of protected areas of Kazakhstan =

This is a list of protected areas of Kazakhstan.

== Nature reserves ==
- Aksu-Djabagly Nature Reserve
- Alakol Nature Reserve
- Almaty Nature Reserve
- Barsa-Kelmes Nature Reserve
- Karatau Nature Reserve
- Korgalzhyn Nature Reserve
- Markakol Nature Reserve
- Naurzum Nature Reserve
- Ustyurt Nature Reserve
- West Altai Nature Reserve
