= Altynemel =

Altynemel Алтынемел
- Village
- Location in Kazakhstan Altynemel (Asia)
- Coordinates: 44°20′09″N 78°26′26″E
- Country: Kazakhstan
- Region: Jetisu Region
- District: Kerbulak District

Population (2009)
  - Total: 1,040
- Time zone: UTC+6 (Omsk Time)
- Postal code: 041102
- Area code: 72842

Altynemel (Kazakh: Алтынемел, Altynemel) is a village in Jetisu Region of south-eastern Kazakhstan.
