= List of highways numbered 13A =

The following highways are numbered 13A:

== Canada ==
- Alberta Highway 13A

== United States ==
- County Road 13A (St. Johns County, Florida)
- Nebraska Spur 13A
- County Route 13A (Monmouth County, New Jersey)
- New York State Route 13A
  - County Route 13A (Allegany County, New York)
  - County Route 13A (Greene County, New York)
  - County Route 13A (Suffolk County, New York)
- Secondary State Highway 13A (Washington) (former)

== See also ==
- List of highways numbered 13
- List of A13 roads
