= List of highways numbered 13 =

The following roads may be referred to as Route 13 or Highway 13. For a list of roads named A13, see List of A13 roads.

== International ==
- AH13 Asian Highway 13
- E13 European route E13
- E013 European route E013

== Afghanistan ==
- The Kabul–Behsud Highway – National Highway 13

== Australia ==
=== Queensland ===
- Mount Lindesay Highway – National Route 13

=== South Australia ===
- - SA

== Austria ==
- Brenner Autobahn

== Bolivia ==
- National Route 13 (Bolivia)

== Canada ==
- Alberta Highway 13
- British Columbia Highway 13
- Manitoba Highway 13
- Newfoundland and Labrador Route 13
- Prince Edward Island Route 13
- Quebec Autoroute 13
- Saskatchewan Highway 13

== Czech Republic ==
- I/13 Highway; Czech: Silnice I/13

== Dominican Republic ==
- DR-13

== Estonia ==
- T13

== Greece ==
- EO13 road

== India ==
- National Highway 13 (India)

== Ireland ==
- N13 road (Ireland)

== Israel ==
- Highway 13 (Israel)

== Italy ==
- Autostrada A13
- RA 13
- State road 13

== Japan ==
- Japan National Route 13
- Tōhoku-Chūō Expressway

== Korea, South ==
- National Route 13
- Gukjido 13

== Laos ==
- National Road 13 (Laos)

== Malaysia ==
- Kemuning–Shah Alam Highway
- FT 13 Malaysia Federal Route 13
- FT 13 Malaysia Federal Route 13 (Sabah)
- A13 Jalan Tambun
- B13 Jalan Uniten–Dengkil, Jalan Serdang
- J13 Jalan Tongkang Pechah
- M13 N13 Jalan Dangi–Kesang Pajak
- R13 Jalan Gua Kelam

== Nigeria ==
- A13 highway (Nigeria)

== Norway ==
- Fv13 Norwegian County Road 13
- Norwegian National Road 13

== Paraguay ==
- National Route 13

== Poland ==
- National road 13

== Portugal ==
- A13 motorway (Portugal)

== Sweden ==
- Swedish national road 13

== United States ==
- Interstate 13 (former proposal)
- U.S. Route 13
- New England Interstate Route 13 (former)
- Alabama State Route 13
- Arkansas Highway 13
- California State Route 13
  - County Route A13 (California)
  - County Route E13 (California)
  - County Route G13 (California)
  - County Route J13 (California)
  - County Route S13 (California)
- Colorado State Highway 13
- Florida State Road 13
  - Florida State Road 13 (former)
  - County Road 13 (Flagler County, Florida)
  - County Road 13 (Orange County, Florida)
  - County Road 13 (St. Johns County, Florida)
      - County Road 13B (St. Johns County, Florida)
- Georgia State Route 13
- Hawaii Route 13 (former)
- Idaho State Highway 13
- Illinois Route 13
- Indiana State Road 13
- Iowa Highway 13
- K-13 (Kansas highway)
- Kentucky Route 13
- Louisiana Highway 13
  - Louisiana State Route 13 (former)
- Massachusetts Route 13
- M-13 (Michigan highway)
- Minnesota State Highway 13
  - County Road 13 (Goodhue County, Minnesota)
  - County Road 13 (Hennepin County, Minnesota)
  - County Road 13 (St. Louis County, Minnesota)
  - County Road 13 (Washington County, Minnesota)
- Mississippi Highway 13
- Missouri Route 13
- Montana Highway 13
- Nebraska Highway 13
  - Nebraska Spur 13C
  - Nebraska Spur 13D
  - Nebraska Spur 13F
  - Nebraska Spur 13H
  - Nebraska Spur 13K
  - Nebraska Recreation Road 13L
  - Nebraska Recreation Road 13M
  - Nebraska Recreation Road 13N
  - Nebraska Recreation Road 13P
- Nevada State Route 13 (former)
- New Hampshire Route 13
- New Jersey Route 13
  - New Jersey Route 13E (former)
  - County Route 13 (Monmouth County, New Jersey)
    - County Route 13B (Monmouth County, New Jersey)
- New Mexico State Road 13
- New York State Route 13
  - County Route 13 (Allegany County, New York)
    - County Route 13B (Allegany County, New York)
    - County Route 13C (Allegany County, New York)
  - County Route 13 (Chemung County, New York)
  - County Route 13 (Chenango County, New York)
  - County Route 13 (Dutchess County, New York)
  - County Route 13 (Franklin County, New York)
  - County Route 13 (Genesee County, New York)
  - County Route 13 (Greene County, New York)
  - County Route 13 (Herkimer County, New York)
  - County Route 13 (Jefferson County, New York)
  - County Route 13 (Lewis County, New York)
  - County Route 13 (Niagara County, New York)
  - County Route 13 (Oneida County, New York)
  - County Route 13 (Onondaga County, New York)
  - County Route 13 (Putnam County, New York)
  - County Route 13 (Rockland County, New York)
  - County Route 13 (Schoharie County, New York)
  - County Route 13 (Schuyler County, New York)
  - County Route 13 (Steuben County, New York)
  - County Route 13 (Suffolk County, New York)
  - County Route 13 (Sullivan County, New York)
  - County Route 13 (Ulster County, New York)
- North Carolina Highway 13 (1920s) (former)
  - North Carolina Highway 13 (1930s) (former)
  - North Carolina Highway 13 (1935–1951) (former)
- North Dakota Highway 13
- Ohio State Route 13
- Oklahoma State Highway 13 (1924) (former)
  - Oklahoma State Highway 13 (1930s-1970s) (former)
- Pennsylvania Route 13 (former)
- South Dakota Highway 13
- Tennessee State Route 13
- Texas State Highway 13 (former)
  - Texas State Highway Loop 13
  - Farm to Market Road 13
  - Texas Park Road 13
- Utah State Route 13
- Virginia State Route 13
  - State Route 13 (Virginia 1918-1933) (former)
- Washington State Highway 13 (former)
- Wisconsin Highway 13
- Wyoming Highway 13

== Uruguay ==
- Route 13 Bartolomé Hidalgo

== Vietnam ==
- National Road 13 (Vietnam)

== Zambia ==
- M13 road (Zambia)

== See also ==
- List of A13 roads
- List of highways numbered 13A

Preceded by 12	Lists of highways 13	Succeeded by 14
