= Big Almaty peak =

Mountain in Kazakhstan

Coordinates: 43.06°N 76.93°E

The Ulqen Almaty peak (Big Almaty peak, Big Almaty Pyramid) is a mountain peak of the Northern slope of the Tian Shan range of the Trans-Ili Alatau.

The peak is located in the mountain spur of the Ulqen Almaty massif directly the North of the Tourist peak just 15 km from the Almaty city. There is a Ulqen Almaty lake (Big Almaty lake) in the East of the peak; from the West are skirting slopes of the Prohodnoye gorge through which the Prokhodnaya River flows.

The Tian Shan Astronomical Observatory is on the slopes of the peak. There are meteorological post and high-altitude scientific station of cosmic rays (SCL) of the Institute of Physics and technology (more commonly known among the local population as "Cosmo station") to the South of the summit on the pass Zhosalykezen.

The peak is the last elevation in the eponymous spur. The height of the peak is 3680 meters. Big Almaty Lake is located at the level of 2,511 meters. The peak shaped like a pyramid. The ridge covered with scree in the lower part, and has a rocky terrain in the upper part. From the top of the peak, you can see the pass and Tourist peak. Pyramid Peak is perfectly visible in clear weather from almost any point of the city.

== Source and links ==
- Вуколов В. Н.. По Северному Тянь-Шаню. Горные туристские маршруты по Заилийскому Алатау и Кунгей-Алатау. — Москва, «Профиздат», 1991 г.
- Photo album
