= List of A13 roads =

This is a list of roads designated A13. Roads entries are sorted in the countries alphabetical order.

- A13 highway (Australia) may refer to:
  - South Australian route A13, including Main South Road and Victor Harbor Road
- A13 motorway (Austria), a road connecting Innsbruck and the A12 to the Italian Autostrada A 22
- A13 motorway (Belgium), a road connecting Antwerp and Liège
- A-13 expressway (Canada), a road in Quebec connecting Autoroute 20 near Trudeau International Airport and Autoroute 640 near Boisbriand
- A13 motorway (France), a road connecting Paris to Caen, Calvados
- A 13 motorway (Germany), a road connecting Berlin with Dresden
- A13 motorway (Italy), a road connecting Padova and Bologna
- A13 road (Latvia), a road connecting the Russian border at Grebņeva and the Lithuanian border at Medumi
- A13 highway (Lithuania), a road connecting Klaipėda and Liepāja
- A13 motorway (Luxembourg), a road connecting Schengen to Bettembourg
- A13 road (Malaysia), a road in Perak connecting Chemor and Ipoh Bulatan Tambun
- A13 motorway (Netherlands), a road connecting The Hague and Rotterdam
- A13 highway (Nigeria), a road connecting Jimeta and Bama
- A13 motorway (Portugal), a road connecting Santarém and the southward turn of the A2
- A13 motorway (Romania), a road connecting Sibiu and Bacău
- A 13 road (Sri Lanka), a road connecting Galkulama and Anuradhapura
- A13 motorway (Switzerland), a road connecting St. Margrethen to Ascona
- A13 road (United Kingdom) may refer to:
  - A13 road (England), a road connecting the City of London with East London and south Essex
  - A13 road (Isle of Man), a road connecting Ramsey and Jurby road
- A13 road (United States of America) may refer to:
  - County Route A13 (California) or Big Springs Road, a road in Plumas County connected to State Route 36

== See also ==
- list of highways numbered 13
- List of highways numbered 13A
