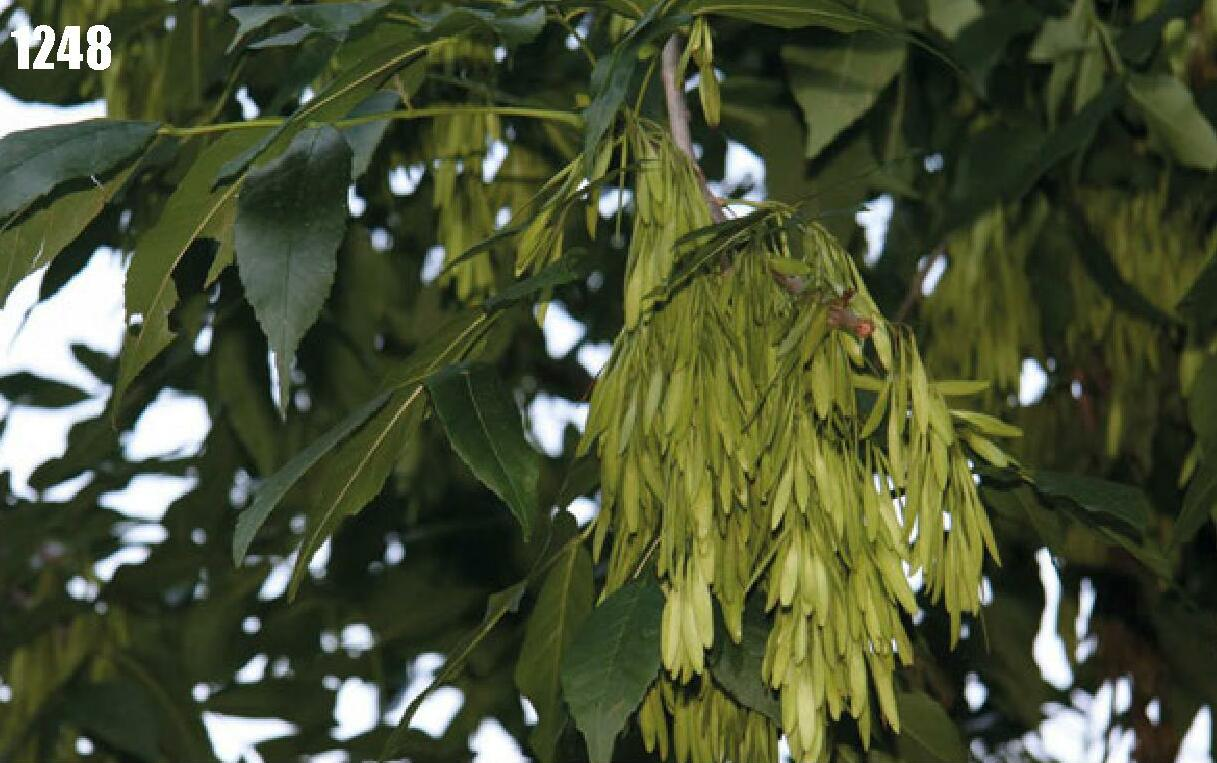

Conservation status
- Least Concern (IUCN 3.1)

Scientific classification
- Kingdom: Plantae
- Clade: Tracheophytes
- Clade: Angiosperms
- Clade: Eudicots
- Clade: Asterids
- Order: Lamiales
- Family: Oleaceae
- Genus: Fraxinus
- Species: F. sogdiana

Binomial name
- Fraxinus sogdiana Bunge

= Fraxinus sogdiana =

Species of flowering plant

Fraxinus sogdiana, known as the Tianshan ash, is a species of flowering plant belonging to the family Oleaceae.

Its native range is Afghanistan to northwestern China and western Pakistan.
