= Koktal =

Koktal Көктал
- Village
- Location in Kazakhstan
- Coordinates: 45°27′38″N 75°12′29″E
- Country: Kazakhstan
- Region: Almaty Region
- District: Balkhash District

Population (2009)
  - Total: 1,247
- Time zone: UTC+6 (Omsk Time)

Koktal (Kazakh: Көктал, Köktal) is a village in Almaty Region, in south-eastern Kazakhstan.
