= European route E13 =

Road in trans-European E-road network

E13

Route information
- Length: 277 km (172 mi)

Major junctions
- North end: Doncaster, England
- South end: London, England

Location
- Countries: United Kingdom

Highway system
- International E-road network; A Class; B Class

European route E13 is part of the International E-road network. It runs most of the length of the M1 motorway in the United Kingdom, from South Yorkshire to London. The E13 follows the route Doncaster – Sheffield – Nottingham – Leicester – Northampton – Luton – London, and is 277 km (172 mi) long.

Although the United Kingdom government participates fully in the E-road network, E-routes are not signposted within the United Kingdom.
