= Charyn National Park =

National park in Kazakhstan

Charyn State National Nature Park
- «Шарын» мемлекеттік ұлттық табиғи паркі (Kazakh); Государственный национальный природный парк «Чарын» (Russian)
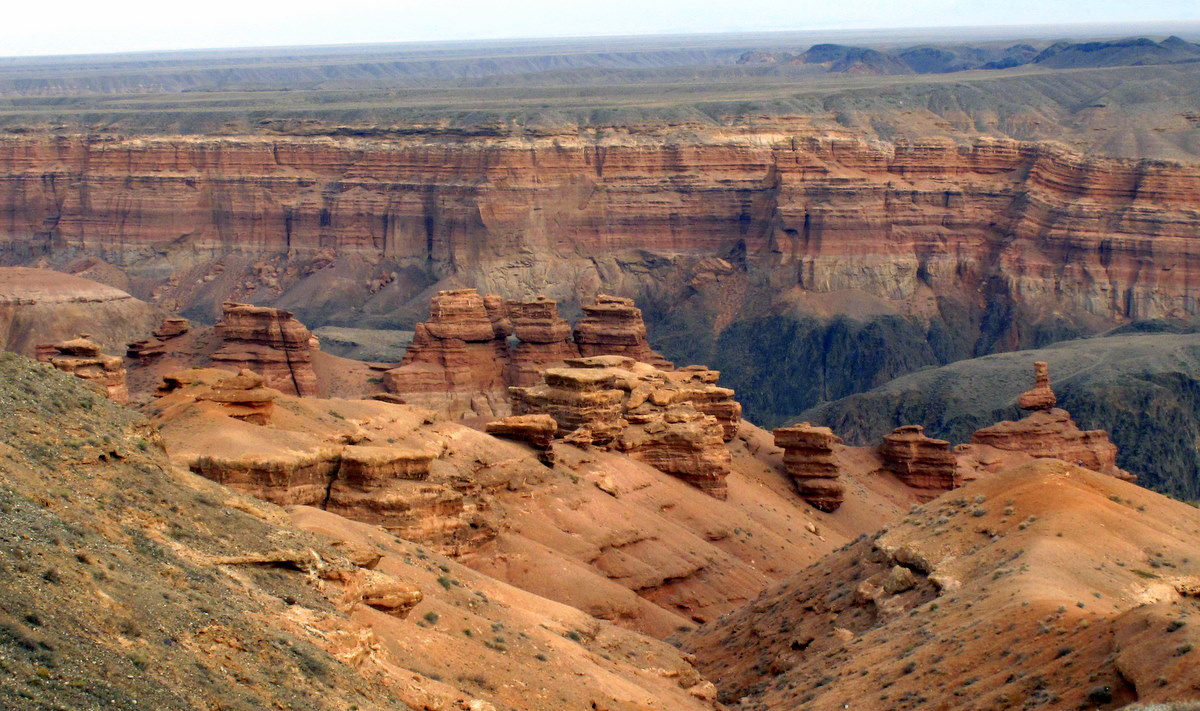
- Charyn Canyon, in Eastern Kazakhstan

- Location within Kazakhstan
- Location: Almaty Region
- Nearest city: Almaty
- Coordinates: 43°21′N 79°04′E
- Area: 125,050 hectares (309,005 acres; 1,250 km^{2}; 483 sq mi)
- Established: 23 February 2004

The Charyn State National Nature Park (Kazakh: «Шарын» мемлекеттік ұлттық табиғи паркі, romanized: Şaryn memlekettık ūlttyq tabiği parkı; Russian: Государственный национальный природный парк «Чарын») is a national park in Kazakhstan, primarily along the Charyn river and encompassing the Charyn Canyon. The park spans approximately 125,050 hectares (309,005 acres) and is situated in the Enbekshikazakh, Raiymbek, and Uygur districts of Almaty Region, about 200 km east of Almaty. The park, established in 2004, aims to protect the unique geological formations of the canyon, the ecological balance of the river and desert systems, and important archaeological sites in the area.

The park also protects relic Sogdian Ash groves, offering a glimpse of ancient vegetation. Parts of the Charyn National Park are designated for recreational activities, drawing visitors for hiking, sightseeing, and nature observation. The park's biodiversity and landscapes make it an important ecological and geological site in Kazakhstan.

== Topography ==
The park is long and thin, protecting both banks of the Charyn River for 50 km, but only to a width of 3 km. The Charyn River at this point runs southwest to northeast through arid foothills of the Tian Shan Mountains 30 km to the south. The canyon reaches 370 meters in depth, and its base is approximately 1,100 meters above sea level. The park protects four main sites:

- Ulken Buguty is in the northeast foothills of the small Ulken Bugty mountain range. The hills include mineral complexes and geology of scientific interest, as well as an area targeted for expansion of gazelle herds.
- Kyzyl Karasai protects habitat for grazing and breeding gazelles, as well as a relic forest of ash trees and sources of mineral waters.
- Charyn Canyon follows the main course of the Charyn River. The canyon reaches 370 meters in depth, and base is approximately 1,100 meters above sea level.
- Aktogay Canyon follows the Charyn River below the Charyn Canyon.

Four levels of protection are provided for different sub-areas of the park: Reserve Status Area (9,427.5 hectares), Zone of Environmental Stabilization (13,147.3 hectares), Tourism and Recreation Area (77,739 hectares), and a Zone of Limited Economic Activity (26,736.2 hectares).

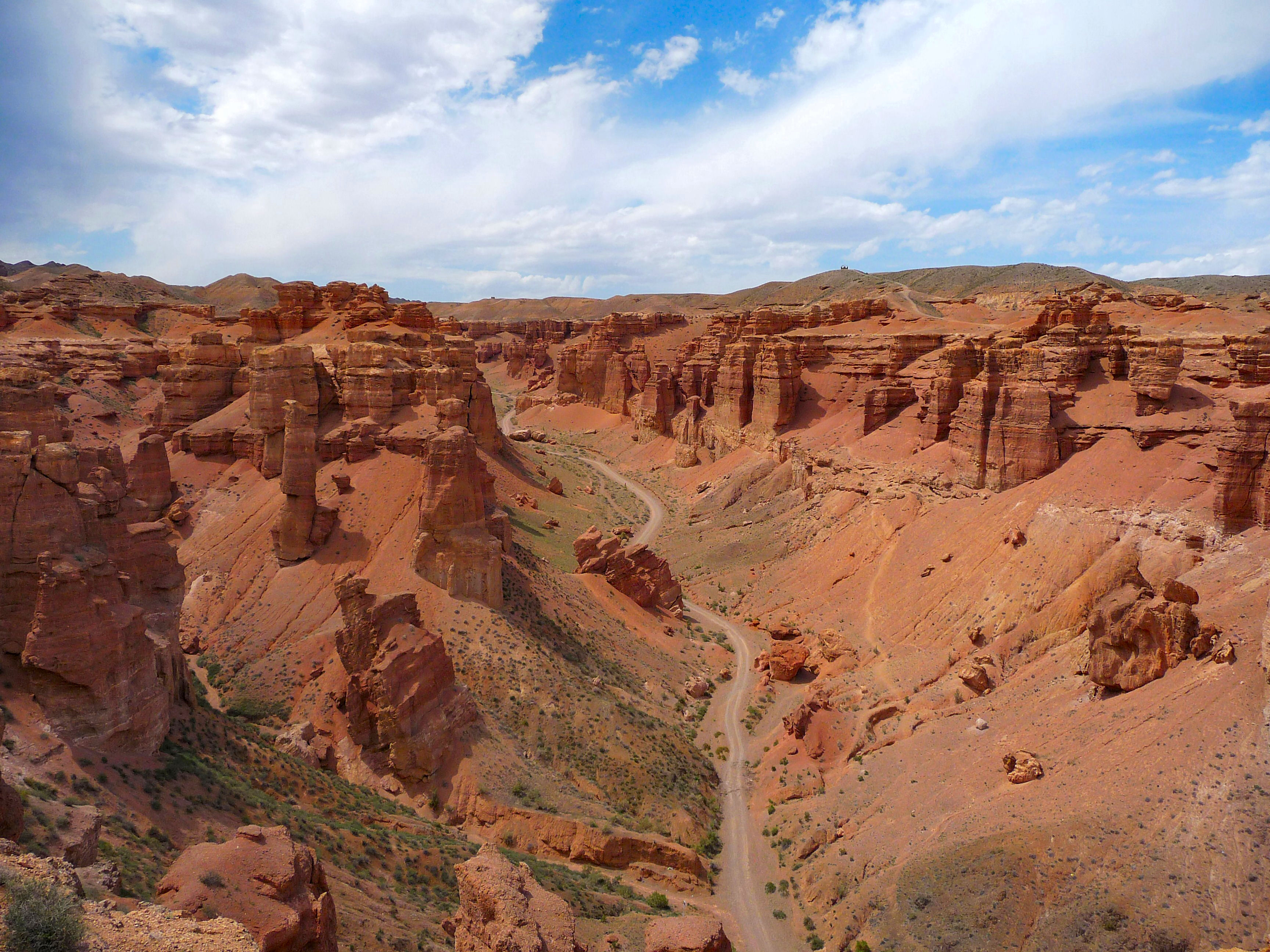
Valley of the Castles, Charyn Canyon National Park

== Climate ==
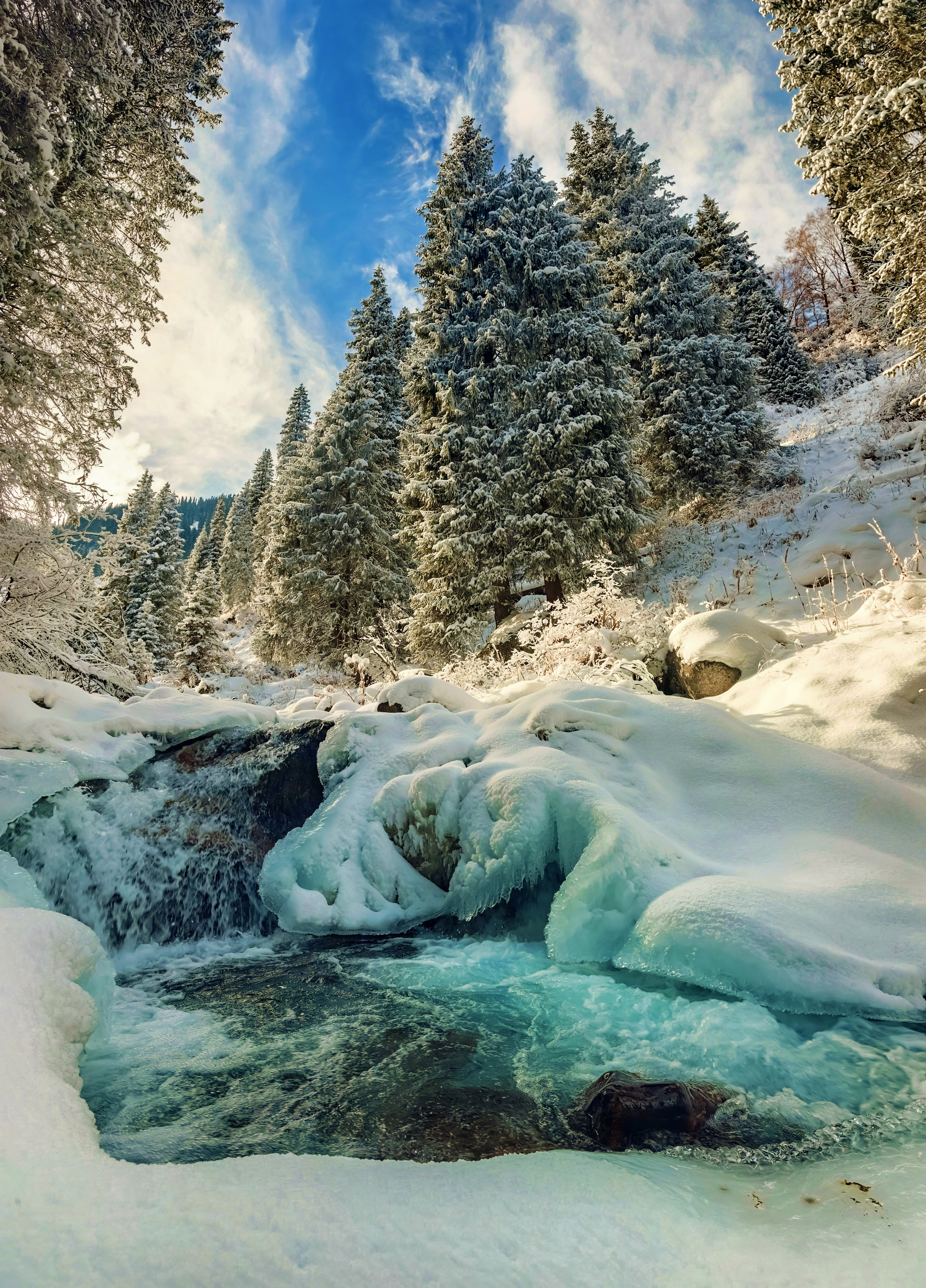
Water flowing from melting ice and snow, Charyn National Park

The climate is "Cold Semi-Arid Climate" (Koeppen Classification BSk: warm, dry summers with cold winters. 312 mm of precipitation per year (maximum in summer). Average temperature ranges from −10.7 °C (12.7 °F) in January to 19.5 °C (67.1 °F) in July.

== Plants and animals ==
Within the park is the Charyn Ash Grove, a remnant stand of what was once a long forest belt of Sogdian ash trees (Fraxinus sogdiana) that spread across the northern slopes of the Tian Shan mountains as early as the Paleogene Period. The ash groves in the park, which cover only about 5,000 hectares (50 km^{2}), can withstand wide swings in salinity and dryness in the floodplain soils. Above the floodplain is a unique community in which the dominant plants include Saxaul (Haloxylon), Eurotia, and Ephedra).

Scientists in the park have recorded 32 species of mammals, 18 of reptiles, 4 of amphibians, 100 of birds, and over 1,000 plants, 50 of which are rare or endemic.

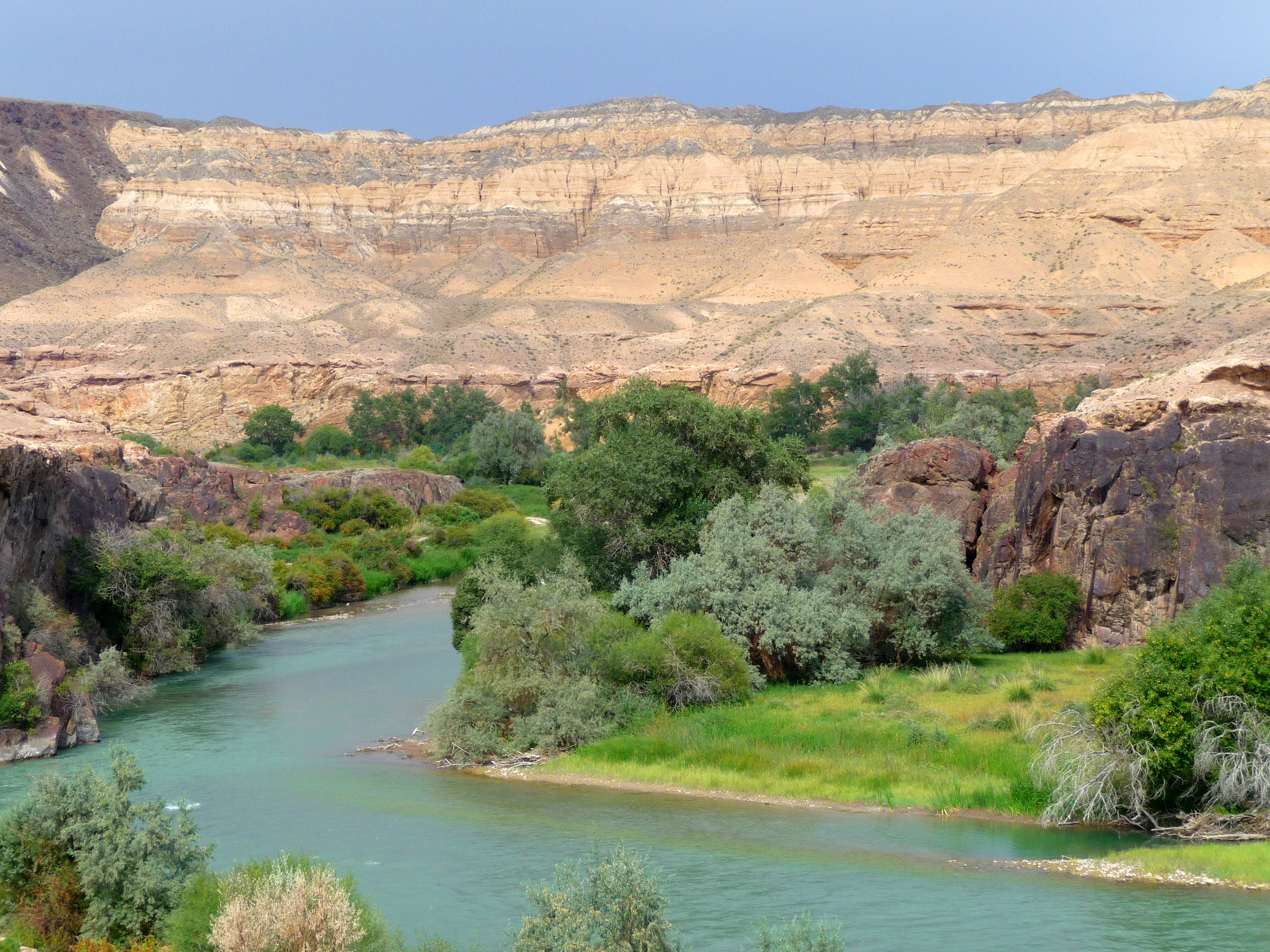
Charyn River, in Charyn Canyon

== Tourism ==
There are three tourist routes in the park:

- Charyn Ash Grove: In addition to the trail, there are guest houses and a 'country house' with seating for 100 people.
- Valley of the Castles: The Valley of the Castles takes its name from the shapes of the rock formations in a small side canyon (3 km long, and 200 – 700 meters wide) off the main Charyn River course, with a views out to the main canyon. The sedimentary layers include orange-grey clays, marl, gritstone, and sandstone. The approach is by a 10 km dirt road, with three parking lots at the site. There is food available at two recreational gazebos, and five rest yurts.
- Cemeteries and Burial Mounds: Located 12 km off the Chundzha-Almaty highway is an area of scattered archaeological sites.
