= Kokpek =

Kokpek Көкпек
- Village
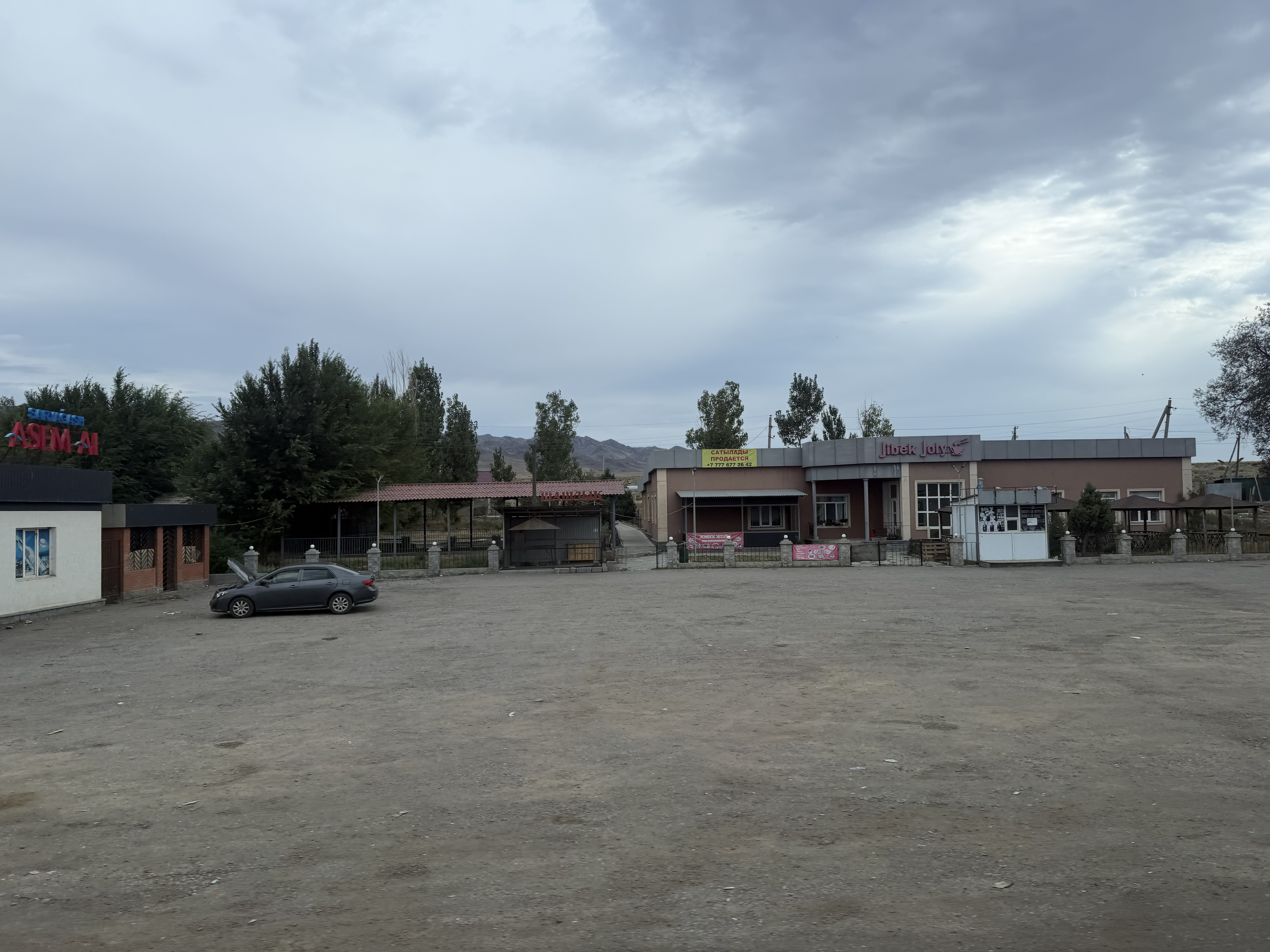

- Location in Kazakhstan
- Coordinates: 43°27′14″N 78°40′49″E
- Country: Kazakhstan
- Region: Almaty Region
- District: Enbekshikazakh District

Population (2009)
  - Total: 74
- Time zone: UTC+6 (Omsk Time)

Kokpek (Kazakh: Көкпек, Kökpek) is a village in Almaty Region, in south-eastern Kazakhstan.
