= Kerbulak District =

Coordinates: 44.364°N 77.973°E

Kerbulak
- District
- Кербұлақ ауданы
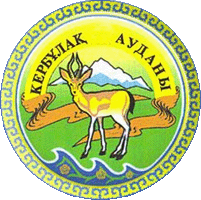
- Seal

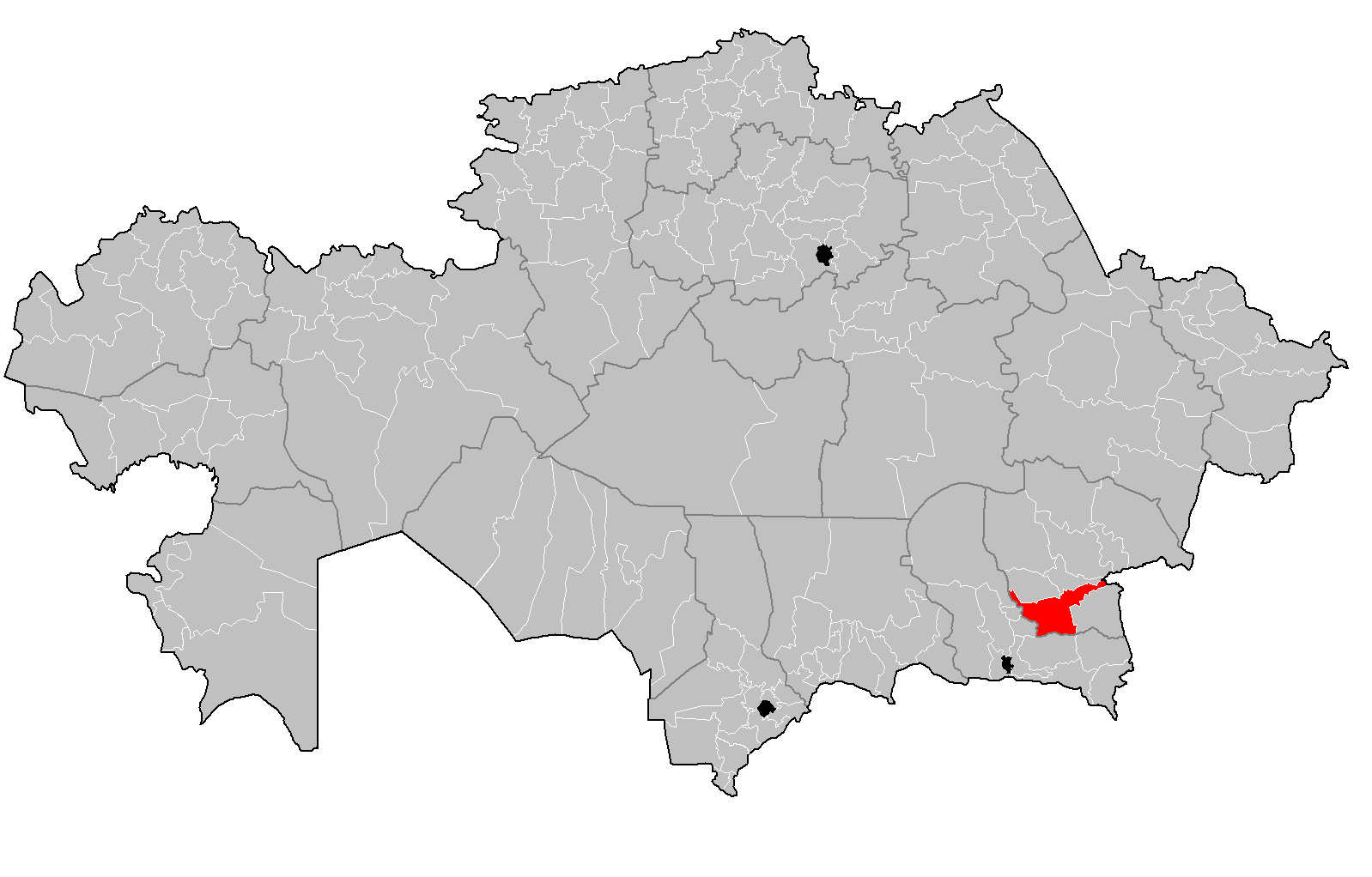
- Country: Kazakhstan
- Region: Jetisu Region
- Administrative center: Saryozek
- Founded: 1973

Government
  - Akim: Sarybaev Galiaskar Tulendinovich

Area
  - Total: 4,400 sq mi (11,500 km^{2})

Population (2013)
  - Total: 49,633
- Time zone: UTC+6 (East)

Kerbulak District (Kazakh: Кербұлақ ауданы, Kerbūlaq audany) is a district of Jetisu Region in Kazakhstan. The administrative center of the district is the settlement of Saryozek. Population: 49,633 (2013 estimate); 47,992 (2009 census results); 53,522 (1999 census results).
