= Sharyn (given name) =

Sharyn is a given name. Notable people with the name include:

- Sharyn Kay Cederman (1948–2000), New Zealand-born feminist and banker
- Sharyn Clough (born in 1965), associate professor of philosophy at Oregon State University
- Sharyn Ghidella (born in 1968), weekend presenter on Seven News Brisbane and weekend sunrise newsreader
- Sharyn Hodgson (born in 1968), Australian actress
- Sharyn McCrumb (born in 1948), American writer on the history and folklore of Appalachia
- Sharyn Moffett, American child actor of the 1940s
- Sharyn November, American editor of books for children and teenagers
- Sharyn O'Halloran, professor of political economics and of international and public affairs at Columbia University, New York City
