= Sary-Ozek, Jetisu Region =

Village in the Jetisu Region of Kazakhstan

Coordinates: 44.36121°N 77.97644°E

Sary-Ozek (Kazakh: Сарыөзек, Saryözek) is a village and the administrative center of Kerbulak District, Jetisu Region, Kazakhstan. It is the administrative center of Sary-Ozek rural district. Sary-Ozek is 900 km southeast of the capital Astana and 80 km southwest of the regional center Taldykorgan. Sary-Ozek sits at 932 meters above sea level.

== History ==
The 68th Missile Brigade of the 31st Rocket Army of the Strategic Rocket Forces (ground-based installations of R-2 missiles, then silo installations of the R-14 "Chusovaya") was based in Sary-Ozek from 1965. From 1967, the 101st missile regiment of the 44th missile division of the Soviet troops was based there. After the dissolution of the Soviet Union these regiments were dissolved.

Until 2013 Saryozek was an urban-type settlement.

== Population ==
In 1999, the population of the village was 12,236 people (5,855 men and 6,381 women). According to the 2009 census, 12,291 people lived in the village (5,972 men and 6,319 women).

As of January 1, 2016, the population of the village was 13,757 people (6,653 men and 7,104 women).

== Economy ==
The village has the Sary-Ozek railway station on the Semey - Almaty line 93 km southwest of the city of Taldykorgan, railway transport enterprises and a grain elevator.

== Features ==
Sary-Ozek has 3 kindergartens and 4 schools, and two mosques. It is at the intersection of the A3 and A353 highways.
