= Charyn =

River in Kazakhstan

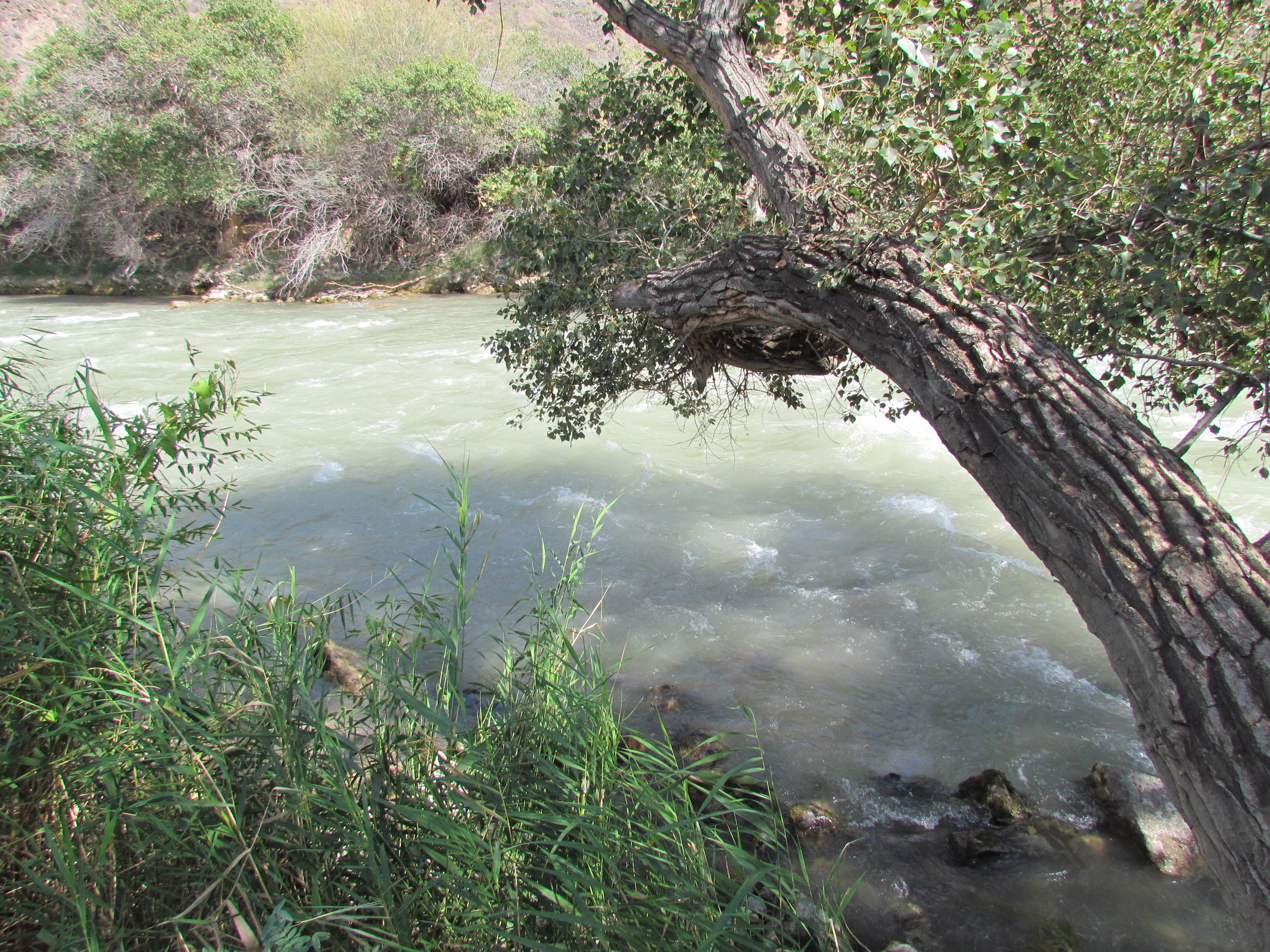
- Charyn River near Charyn National Park

- Location in Kazakhstan

Location
- Country: Kazakhstan

Physical characteristics
- Source
  - coordinates: 43°16′14″N 80°32′04″E
- 2nd source
  - coordinates: 42°27′50″N 79°30′06″E
- 3rd source
  - coordinates: 42°52′16″N 78°33′29″E
- Mouth: Ili
  - coordinates: 43°55′52″N 79°25′39″E
- Length: 427 km (265 mi)
- Basin size: 7,720 km^{2} (2,980 sq mi)

Basin features
- Progression: Ili→ Lake Balkhash

The Charyn (Russian: Чарын) or Sharyn (Kazakh: Шарын, Şaryn) is a river in the Almaty Province of Kazakhstan. It flows through the Charyn National Park and into the Ili River, which is considered to be the largest artery of Lake Balkhash. The Charyn is 427 kilometres (265 mi) long, and has a drainage basin of 7,720 square kilometres (2,980 sq mi). It runs through the territory of Kegen and Uighur regions, forming the 154-km long Charyn Canyon.

The Moinak Hydro Power Plant lies on the river. The plant powers the city of Almaty to the south.

== Description ==
The Sharyn river is full-flowing due to many tributaries that flow into it from the northern slope of the Terskei and Kungei Alatau ranges. With its waters, it cuts a canyon through the eastern parts of the Zhalanash depression and the Toraigyr mountains. In the Zhalanash valley, the canyon is called Aktogay, which means white stream in Kazakh, due to its trapezoidal shape.

== See also ==
- Charyn National Park
