= Kegen =

Kegen Кеген
- Village
- Location in Kazakhstan
- Coordinates: 43°01′11″N 79°13′13″E
- Country: Kazakhstan
- Region: Almaty Region
- District: Raiymbek District

Population (2009)
  - Total: 9,049
- Time zone: UTC+6 (Omsk Time)
- Postal code: 041400
- Area code: 72777

Kegen (Kazakh: Кеген [kʲeˈgʲen]) is a selo and seat of Raiymbek District in Almaty Region of south-eastern Kazakhstan. Population: 9,049 (2009 census results); 8,078 (1999 census results).

== Climate ==
Kegen has a warm-summer humid continental climate (Dfb) according to the Köppen climate classification.

Climate data for Kegen (1991–2020)
Month	Jan	Feb	Mar	Apr	May	Jun	Jul	Aug	Sep	Oct	Nov	Dec	Year
Daily mean °C (°F)	−10.8 (12.6)	−8.1 (17.4)	−1.3 (29.7)	5.6 (42.1)	10.1 (50.2)	14.0 (57.2)	15.9 (60.6)	14.9 (58.8)	10.3 (50.5)	4.0 (39.2)	−2.5 (27.5)	−8.1 (17.4)	3.7 (38.7)
Average precipitation mm (inches)	9.8 (0.39)	10.5 (0.41)	16.8 (0.66)	36.3 (1.43)	61.4 (2.42)	65.1 (2.56)	63.8 (2.51)	46.0 (1.81)	34.8 (1.37)	31.1 (1.22)	19.4 (0.76)	13.4 (0.53)	408.4 (16.08)
Source: NOAA
