= Almaty Region =

Region in southern Kazakhstan

Almaty Region Алматы облысы (Kazakh) Алматинская область (Russian)
- Region
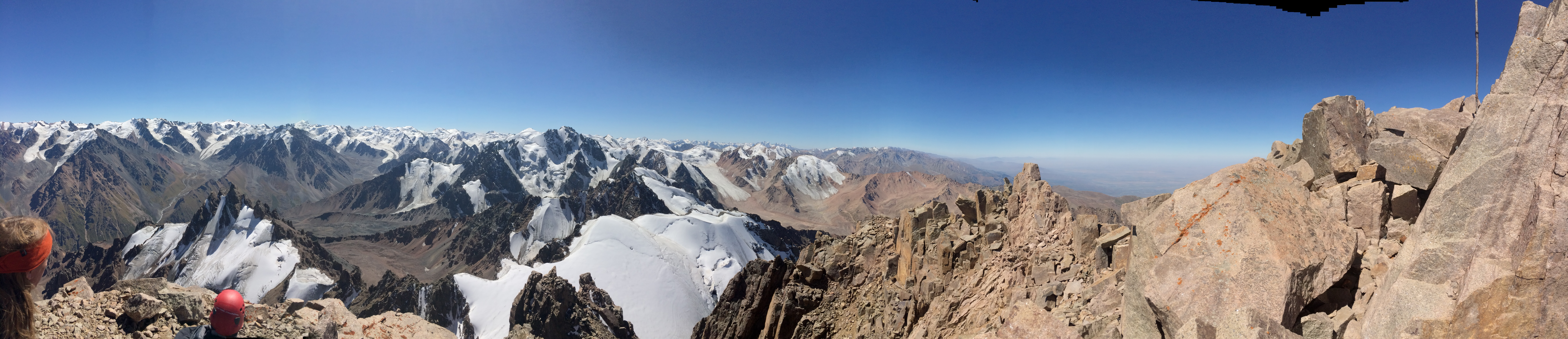
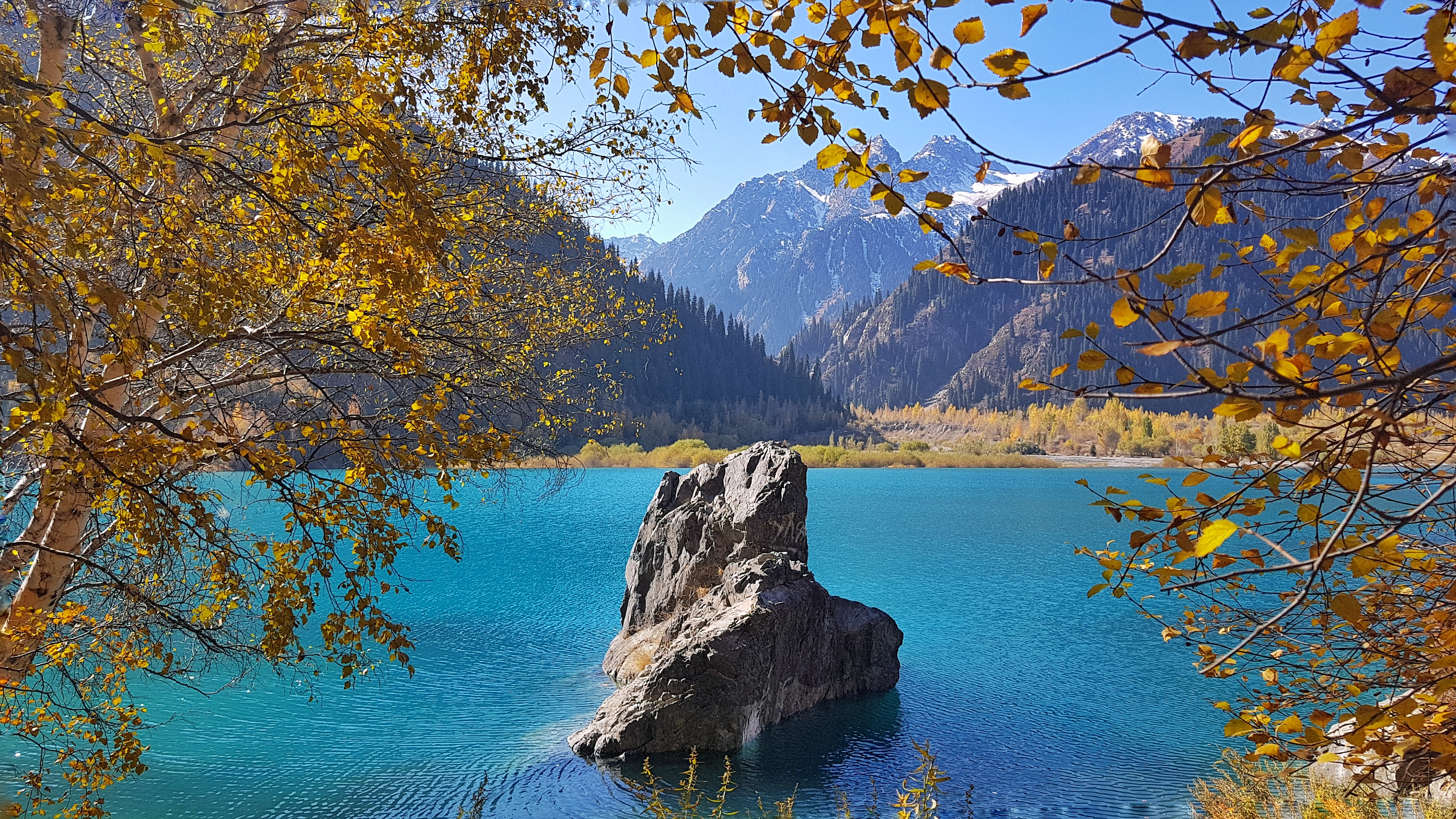
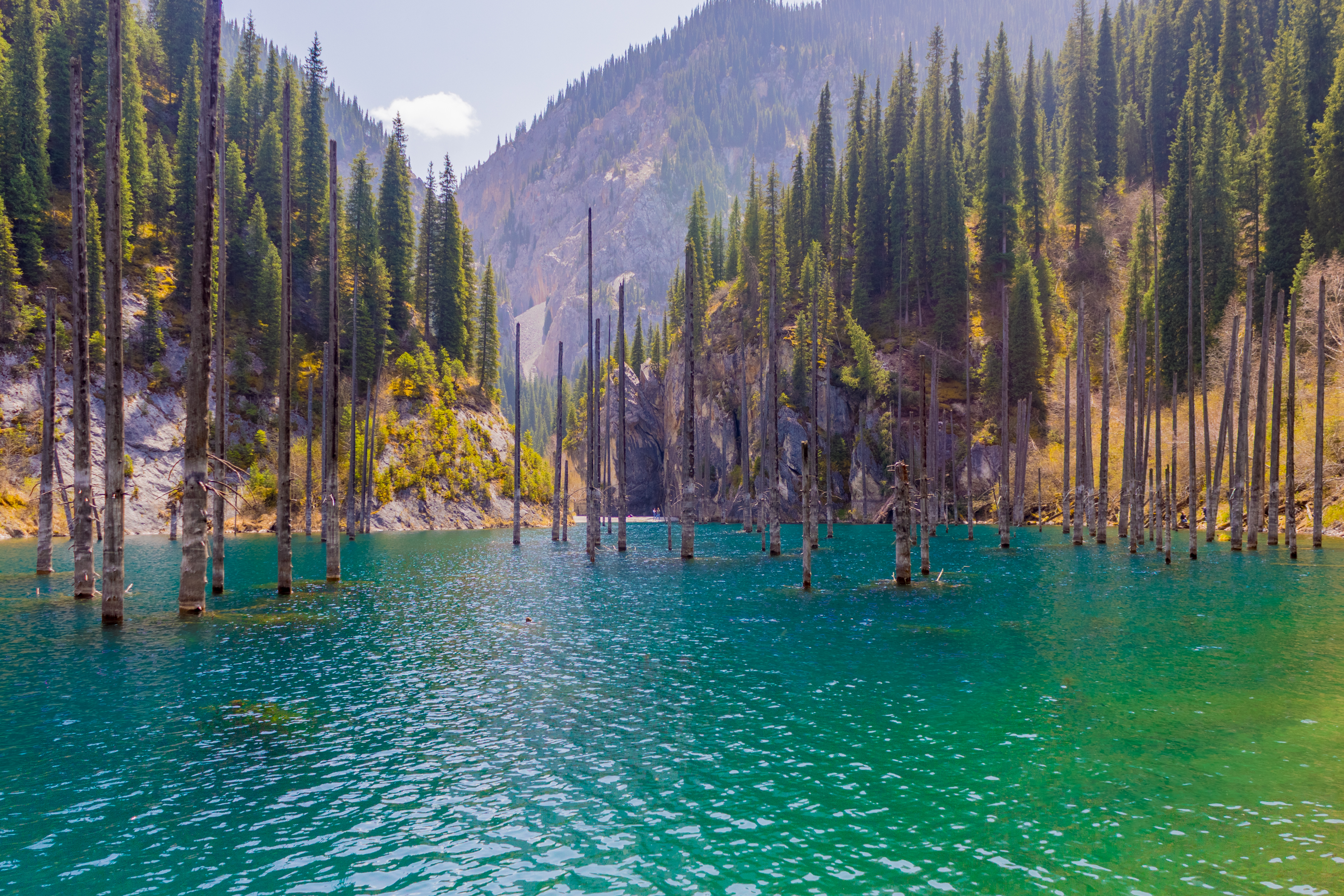
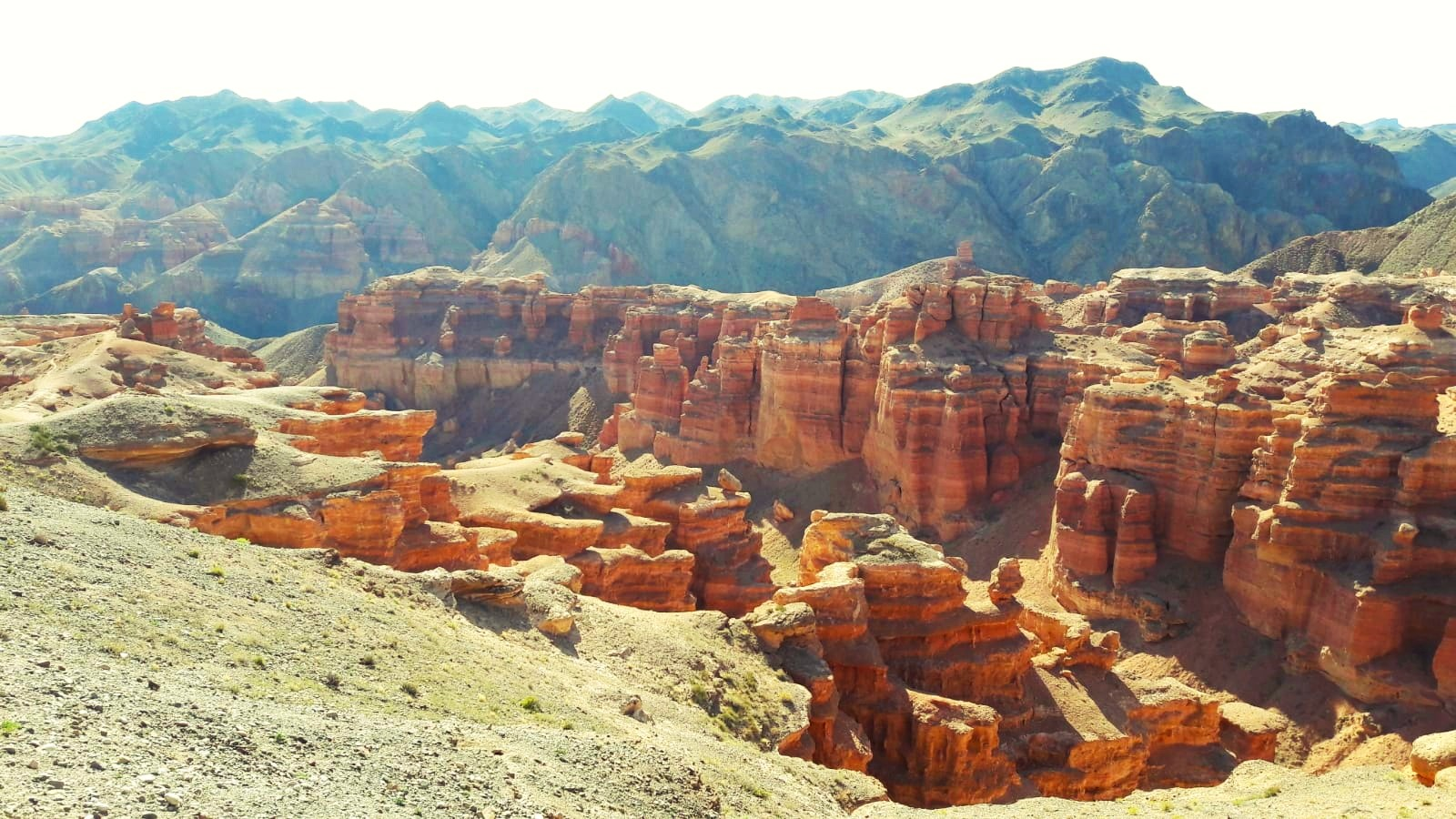
- From the top to bottom-right, Big Almaty Peak, Issyk Lake, Kaindy Lake, Charyn National Park, Ile-Alatau National Park

- Flag Coat of arms

- Map of Kazakhstan, location of Almaty Region highlighted
- Coordinates: 45°0′N 78°0′E
- Country: Kazakhstan
- Capital: Qonayev

Government
  - Akim: Şyñğys Ärinov (Amanat)

Area
  - Total: 105,411 km^{2} (40,699 sq mi)

Population
  - Total: 1,520,216
  - Density: 14.4218/km^{2} (37.3523/sq mi)

GDP (Nominal, 2024)
  - Total: KZT 5,915 billion (US$ 12.421 billion) · 5th
  - Per capita: KZT 3,826,700 (US$ 8,036)
- Time zone: UTC+5
  - Summer (DST): UTC+5 (not observed)
- Postal codes: 040000
- Area codes: +7 (7272), +7 (7282)
- ISO 3166 code: KZ-ALM
- Vehicle registration: 05, B
- Districts: 17
- Cities: 3
- Townships: 15
- Villages: 769
- HDI (2022): 0.785 high · 6th
- Website: zhetysu.gov.kz

Almaty Region (Kazakh: Almaty oblysy [ɑɫmɑˈtə ˌwobɫɤˈsə]; Russian: Алматинская область), formerly known as the Alma-Ata Region until 1993, is a region in Kazakhstan, located in the southeastern part of the country. It surrounds, but does not include, the eponymous city of Almaty. Its capital is Qonaev.

== Geography ==
The region borders Kyrgyzstan and Xinjiang in the People's Republic of China. The region also borders three other regions of Kazakhstan: Jambyl Region to the west, Karaganda Region to the northwest, and East Kazakhstan Region to the north. Almaty Region has an area of 224,000 square kilometres.

Much of the northwestern border of the region runs along Lake Balkhash, whose main affluent, the Ili River, is the most significant river of the region. In the region's northeast, it shares the four lakes of the Alakol Depression (Lakes Alakol, Sasykkol, Koshkarkol, and Zhalanashkol) with East Kazakhstan Region. Other lakes within the region include Bartogay Lake and Kapshagay lakes, Lake Issyk, Kaindy and Kolsai lakes.

The Trans-Ili Alatau branch of the Tian Shan Mountains extends from China and Kyrgyzstan into Almaty Region, along its southern border with Kyrgyzstan. Farther to the northeast, the Dzungarian Alatau runs along the region's border with China. The Charyn Canyon is one of the region's famous scenic spots.

== History ==
Alma-Ata Region, the predecessor of today's Almaty Region, was created from the historical region of Zhetysu on March 10, 1932. Its capital was Alma-Ata (Almaty). Several times during the Soviet period, the north-eastern part of the region, centered on Taldyqorğan, was separated from Alma-Ata Region, forming a separate Taldy-Kurgan Region, only to be merged into Alma-Ata Region again several years later.

In April 2001 the administrative center of Almaty Region was moved from Almaty to Taldyqorğan. Thus Taldyqorğan has become a regional capital again - this time without splitting the region. Almaty region was formed on March 10, 1932 with a center in the city of Almaty. The region included 18 districts. At the end of 1939, part of the districts was transferred to the Dzhambul and Semipalatinsk regions, 23 districts remained in the Alma-Ata region, including the newly formed 7. In March 1944, Taldy-Kurgan Region was allocated from its structure, to which 11 districts were transferred.

== Heads of the region ==
1. Baiken Ashymov 1968—1970
2. Bimende Sadvokasov 1970—1972
3. Aripbay Alybaev 1972—1978
4. Sakan Kussainov 1978—1982
5. Abubakir Tynynybaev 1982—1986
6. Vladislav Anufriev 1986—1988
7. Anatoly Zhigulin 1988—1990
8. Saginbek Tursunov 1990—1993
9. Umirzak Uzbekov (1994-1996)
10. Serik Ahimbekov 1996—1997
11. Zamanbek Nurkadilov (December 1997 - May 2001)
12. Shalbai Kulmakhanov (May 2001 - August 11, 2005)
13. Serik Umbetov (2005-2011)
14. Anzar Musakhanov (from April 13, 2011 to August 20, 2014)
15. Amandyk Batalov (from August 20, 2014)

== Awards ==
On October 28, 1966, Alma-Ata region was awarded by Order of Lenin for its success in increasing the production and procurement of grain, meat, milk and other agricultural products. On December 3, 1970, Alma-Ata region was awarded by the second Order of Lenin for the great successes achieved by the working people of the region in fulfilling the five-year plan for the development of industrial and agricultural production.

== Administrative divisions ==
The region is administratively divided into seventeen districts and the cities of Konaev, Taldyqorğan, and Tekeli.

1. Aksu District, the administrative center is Zhansugirov;
2. Alakol District, the administrative center is Üşaral;
3. Balkhash District, the administrative center is Bakanas;
4. Enbekshikazakh District, the administrative center is Esik;
5. Eskeldi District, the administrative center is Karabulak;
6. Ile District, the administrative center is Otegen Batyr;
7. Karasay District, the administrative center is Kaskelen;
8. Karatal District, the administrative center is Ushtobe;
9. Kerbulak District, the administrative center is Sary-Ozek;
10. Koksu District, the administrative center is Balpyk Bi;
11. Kegen District, the administrative center is Kegen;
12. Panfilov District, the administrative center is Zharkent;
13. Raiymbek District, the administrative center is Narynkol;
14. Sarkand District, the administrative center is Sarkand;
15. Talgar District, the administrative center is Talgar;
16. Uygur District, the administrative center is Chundzha;
17. Zhambyl District, the administrative center is Uzynagash
18. Taldyqorğan city
19. Konaev city
20. Tekeli city

== Climate ==
The natural conditions of the Almaty region include 5 climatic zones - from deserts to eternal snows. The climate is sharply continental, the average January temperature in the lowlands is −15 °C, in the foothills - 6-8 C; July - +16 C and + 24 + 25 C, respectively. The annual rainfall on the plains is up to 300 mm, in the foothills and mountains - from 500-700 to 1000 mm per year.

== Ethnic composition ==
The share of Kazakhs, Russians, Uigurs by region census of 2009 year. Subsequently, the ethnic composition underwent strong changes with the advent and collapse of the Soviet Union. At present, it is still multi-ethnic, however, Kazakhs absolutely prevail (72.07%), the share of Russians has greatly reduced to 13.33% of the region's inhabitants. The number of Uigurs is also significant (7.73%). The number of other Asian peoples - Turks, Kurds, Uzbeks, Kyrgyz, as well as Koreans does not exceed 4% in total. The numerous communities of Germans, Greeks, Poles, Ukrainians, and other European peoples, who were once living in Kazakhstan during the Soviet era, significantly decreased due to mass emigration to other countries after 1991.

== Demographics ==
Historical population
| Year | Pop. | ±% p.a. |
|---|---|---|
| 1979 | 1,452,204 | — |
| 1989 | 1,641,638 | +1.23% |
| 1999 | 1,557,269 | −0.53% |
| 2009 | 1,807,894 | +1.50% |
| 2021 | 2,077,656 | +1.17% |
Source: Citypopulation

As of 2020, the Almaty Region has a population of 2,055,724.

Ethnic groups (2020):

- Kazakh: 72.32%
- Russian: 13.12%
- Uyghur: 7.74%
- Turkish: 1.84%
- Azerbaijani: 0.86%
- Others: 4.12%

Note: the population and ethnicity figures exclude the City of Almaty, which is administratively separate from the Almaty Region.

=== Historical Ethnic Composition ===
In the 1989 census (excepting Alma-Ata):

- Kazakhs: 54.2%.
- Russians: 28.6%.
- Uigurs: 7.8%.
- Others: 9.4%.

In the 1999 census (excepting Almaty):

- Kazakhs: 66.4%.
- Russians: 23.8%.
- Uigurs: 7.0%.
- Others: 4.6%.

In the 2009 census (excepting Almaty):

- Kazakhs: 68.2%.
- Russians: 22.8%.
- Uigurs: 6.2%.
- Other: 3.8%.

== Sights ==
In 2021, the mountain cluster of the Almaty Region was selected as one of the top 10 tourism destinations in Kazakhstan. Other popular sights include:

- Lake Alakol - healing lake
- Burkhan Bulak - highest waterfall
- Altynemel - national park
- Besqaynar - Ski resorts located 1500 metres above sea level
- Kolsay
- Khan Taniry
- Kaindy
- Balkhash
- Tamgaly - a World Heritage Site (petroglyphs)
- Charyn Canyon - Charyn National Park
- Talgar - a region where the Issyk kurgan is located
- Medeo - one of the most famous ice rinks in the world
- Dostyk - a point of entry from China to Kazakhstan
- Kapchagay Dam on the Ili River

Also in 2021, the tourism department of Kazakhstan announced that 15 huts for tourism shelter equipped with Wi-Fi, charging stations, and first-aid kits are planned to be constructed in the Almaty mountain area in the near future. The huts will be located in the middle and left Talgar, Kimasar, Tuyuk-Su, Upper Gorelnik, Big Almaty, Shukur and Prokhodnoye gorges.

== Culture ==
- Taldyqorğan Drama Theatre named after B.Rimova: Drama Theatre named after B.Rimova was opened on November 4, 1975. A group of young graduates of the Almaty State Conservatory named after Kurmangazy, who graduated from class of People's Artist of Kazakhstan Sholpan Zhandarbekova, opened the curtain of the theatre with the performance of G. Musrepov “Kozy Kurpesh-Bayan Sulu”. On August 31, 2000, the theatre was named after People's Artist of Kazakhstan Biken Rimova, laureate of State Prize. On October 30, 2018, they moved to a new building.
- Museum of Applied Arts named after Master Darkembay» PUSE: The total area is 3.0 hectares. Internal area of the museum - 375 square meters. The number of exhibits - 2437. The museum consists of 6 exhibition halls. The number of people for excursion is 25 per a group.
- Museum «Batyr babalar»(Heroic ancestors): The museum was built in 2016. It was opened in 2017 within the framework of the program of the First President of the Republic of Kazakhstan Nursultan Nazarbayev «Course towards the future: modernization of Kazakhstan's identity».
- - Ilyas Zhansugurov literary museum: It was opened in 1984 on the occasion of the 90th anniversary of the poet I. Zhansugurov. The museum is dedicated to the life and work of the poet. The building of museum was constructed in 1905-1907. From 1918 to 1976 it was used as various institutions of the Soviet government: district branch of the regional union «Kosshy», the editorial office of the regional newspaper «October Flag», a laboratory for insemination of livestock, in 1976-1980 the regional museum of local lore. The total area of the museum is 271 square meters. The total number of exhibits is 6407. The building is under state protection as an example of architecture of the 19th century.
- Museum of victims of political repression The building of museum was constructed in 2018 in accordance with the decision of the akim of Almaty region A. Batalov in the framework of the program «Course towards the future: modernization of Kazakhstan's identity» of the First President of the Republic of Kazakhstan N. Nazarbayev. The total area of the building is 535 square meters. Museum departments: 1. The history of repression in Kazakhstan in 1916-1986; 2. In memory of victims of political repression; 3. Historical and educational society «Adilet» and its activities. Museum funds are being replenished with materials relating to citizens who were subjected to political repression from the 1920s to the 1950s.
- Museum «Respect for Mother» The museum was built in 2014, opened in 2015. The building area is 4987 square meters. Departments of the museum: on 2 floors there are 2 thematic halls: 1. craft and jewelry 2. Mother heroines. Design capacity: 1 group of 30 people.
- «Abylkhan Kasteev Fine Art Gallery» The museum was created in 2004 for the 100th anniversary of the national artist Abylkhan Kasteev. Total area - 427.0 square meters, Internal area of the gallery - 1200 square meters. The number of materials of museum significance is 166. The gallery consists of 9 rooms. The number of people on excursion is 10 per group. Address: Almaty region, Panfilovsky district, Zharkent, Yuldashev street, house number 9
- «Gallery of Fine Art» PUSE It was founded in 2003. The number of materials of museum significance is 404. The total area is 1011.9 square meters, of which 10 exhibition halls - 674.0 square meters. The number of people on excursion is 45 - 50 people per a group. The gallery works in five areas: • Research and assembly work. • Scientific and fund work. • Scientific and expositional work. • Cultural and educational work. Work with the media
- PUI «Historical and Cultural Center «Atameken» of the First President of the Republic of Kazakhstan-Elbasy» Put into operation on December 1, 2017. All the exhibits collected in the golden fund of the center tell about the life of President Nursultan Nazarbayev from his childhood to the present day, when he became the Leader of independent Kazakhstan. The total area is 3.5000 ha. The internal volume of the museum is 1249.5 square meters. The number of materials of museum significance is 649. The center consists of 4 exhibition halls, there is a conference room for 16 seats.

http://kultura.zhetisu.gov.kz/
