= Raiymbek District =

Coordinates: 43.0184°N 79.2237°E

Raiymbek
- District
- Райымбек ауданы
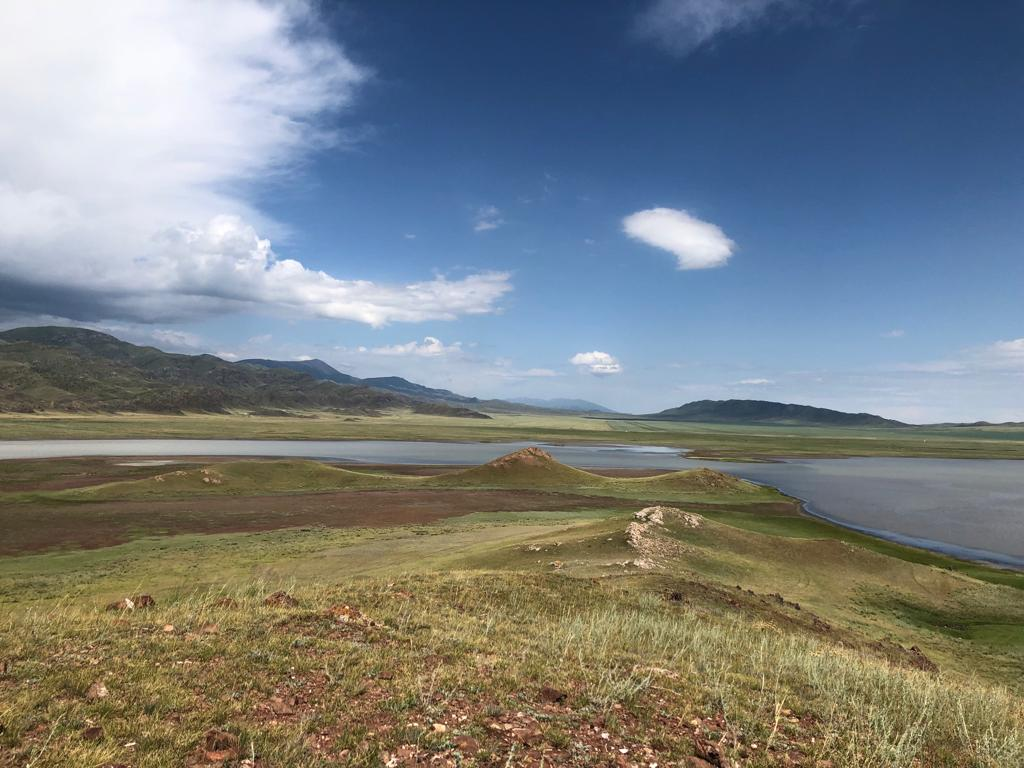
- Tuzkol, Raiymbek District

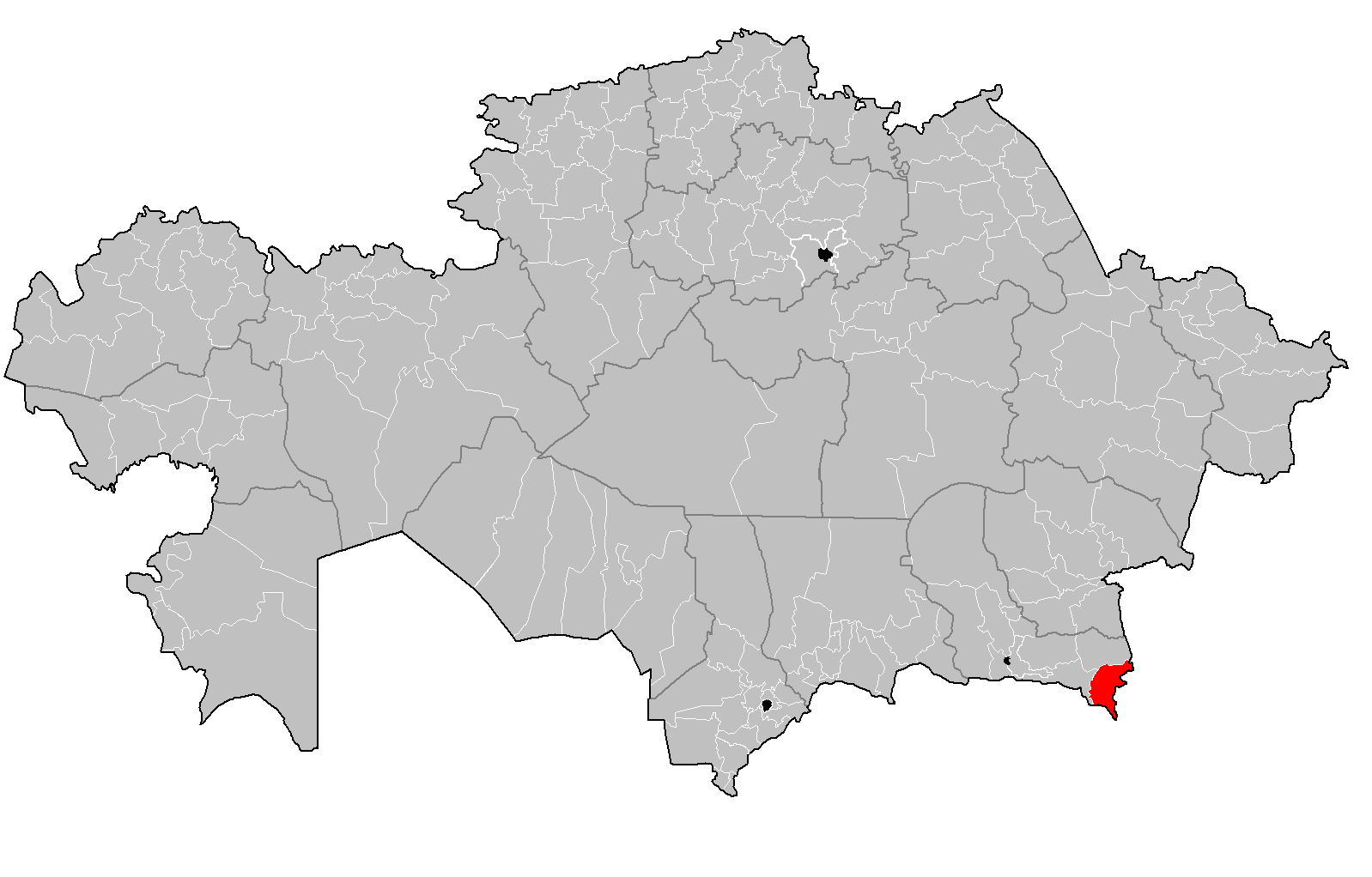
- Country: Kazakhstan
- Region: Almaty Region
- Administrative center: Kegen
- Founded: 1936

Government
  - Akim (mayor): Berik Duisenbayev

Area
  - Total: 5,500 sq mi (14,200 km^{2})

Population (2013)
  - Total: 79,624
- Time zone: UTC+6 (East)

Raiymbek District (Kazakh: Райымбек ауданы, Raiymbek audany) is a district of Almaty Region in Kazakhstan. Named after Raiymbek Batyr, a famous 18th-century warrior and folk hero who fought to liberate southeastern Kazakhstan from Dzungar rule. The administrative center of the district is the selo of Kegen. Population: 79,624 (2013 estimate); 80,377 (2009 census results); 83,093 (1999 census results).
