= List of World Heritage Sites in Kazakhstan =

Location of World Heritage Sites in Kazakhstan. Green dots indicate the Saryarka sites, yellow dots are the Cold Winter Deserts of Turan sites, blue dots are the Silk Road sites, cyan are the sites of Tien Shan, and purple dots indicate the Rock Mosques and Associated Sacred Sites of Mangystau.

The United Nations Educational, Scientific and Cultural Organization (UNESCO) designates World Heritage Sites of outstanding universal value to cultural or natural heritage which have been nominated by countries which are signatories to the UNESCO World Heritage Convention, established in 1972. Cultural heritage consists of monuments (such as architectural works, monumental sculptures, or inscriptions), groups of buildings, and sites (including archaeological sites). Natural heritage consists of natural features (physical and biological formations), geological and physiographical formations (including habitats of threatened species of animals and plants), and natural sites which are important from the point of view of science, conservation, or natural beauty. Kazakhstan accepted the convention on 29 April 1994.

There are seven World Heritage Sites listed in Kazakhstan, with a further 14 on the tentative list. The first site inscribed to the list was the Mausoleum of Khoja Ahmed Yasawi, at the 27th Session of the World Heritage Committee, held in Paris in 2003. Three sites are transnational: Silk Roads: the Routes Network of Chang'an-Tianshan Corridor is shared with China and Kyrgyzstan, Western Tien-Shan with Kyrgyzstan and Uzbekistan, and the Cold Winter Deserts of Turan with Uzbekistan and Turkmenistan. Four sites are cultural while Saryarka – Steppe and Lakes of Northern Kazakhstan, Tien-Shan, and the deserts of Turan are natural.

== World Heritage Sites ==
UNESCO lists sites under ten criteria; each entry must meet at least one of the criteria. Criteria i through vi are cultural, and vii through x are natural.

* Transnational site

World Heritage Sites
Site	Image	Location	Year listed	UNESCO data	Description
Mausoleum of Khoja Ahmed Yasawi	A large brick mausoleum with blue domes	Turkistan Region	2003	1103; i, iii, iv (cultural)	The mausoleum, dedicated to the 12th century Sufi mystic Ahmad Yasawi, was built between 1389 and 1405 during the rule of Timur. Although the mausoleum remains partially unfinished, it is one of the largest and best-preserved Timurid buildings. It was also a prototype for later Timurid buildings, especially in the capital Samarkand.
Petroglyphs within the Archaeological Landscape of Tamgaly	Petroglyphs depicting animals	Almaty Region	2004	1145; iii (cultural)	Petroglyphs in the Tanbaly Gorge in Chu-Ili mountains depict humans, animals, and religious figures. They date from the second half of the second millennium BCE to the beginning of the 20th century and provide insight into the life of pastoral communities that lived in the region. A number of tombs, kurgans, and enclosures from Bronze and Iron Age have also been found in the area.
Saryarka – Steppe and Lakes of Northern Kazakhstan	Marshes and a lake	Akmola Region Kostanay Region	2008	1102; ix, x (natural)	Saryarka comprises two areas, Naurzum Nature Reserve and Korgalzhyn Nature Reserve (pictured), that protect the largely undisturbed Central Asian steppe, lakes, and wetlands. These habitats are an important stopover for migratory birds and provide sanctuaries for a large number of threatened species, including Siberian white cranes, Dalmatian pelicans, Pallas's fish eagles and Saiga antelopes.
Silk Roads: the Routes Network of Chang'an-Tianshan Corridor*	Map of Eurasia with silk roads marked	several sites	2014	1442; ii, iii, v, vi (cultural)	The Silk Road is an ancient network of trade routes that started forming in the 2nd century BCE and remained active until the 16th century. The roads connected societies of China, India, Central Asia, Western Asia, and the Near East. In addition to exchange of goods, they also contributed to the spread of technologies, ideologies, and religions, including Buddhism, Nestorian Christianity, Manichaeism, Zoroastrianism and early Islam. Several towns and supporting infrastructure have been constructed along the routes. This World Heritage site covers the corridors from Chang'an/Luoyang, the Han and Tang capitals of China, to the Zhetysu region of Central Asia, and is shared with China and Kyrgyzstan. Eight sites in Kazakhstan are listed.
Western Tien-Shan*	Mountain scenery with a canyon	Turkistan Region	2016	1490; x (natural)	The property, shared with Kyrgyzstan and Uzbekistan, covers the western part of the Tian Shan mountain range. It is rich in biodiversity and a number of cultivated fruit crops originate from the area. Mountain peaks reach above 4,500 metres (14,800 ft). Seven sites are listed in Kazakhstan, including Aksu Canyon (pictured).
Cold Winter Deserts of Turan*	Desert scene with some rocks	Jetisu Region, Kyzylorda Region	2023	1693; ix, x (natural)	This property, shared with Turkmenistan and Uzbekistan, comprises 14 sites that represent the ecosystems of Central Asian deserts with harsh continental climate with very cold winters and hot summers. The deserts are home to numerous plant species, as well as saiga antelope and goitered gazelle. Five areas are listed in Kazakhstan: Kaskakulan, Barsa-Kelmes Nature Reserve, and three sites in the Altyn-Emel National Park (pictured).
Rock Mosques and Associated Sacred Sites of Mangystau	A hill with some walls and stairs leading to a mosque	Mangystau Region	2026	1760; ii, iii (cultural)	This nomination comprises five mosques (the mosque of Beket-ata pictured) and adjacent necropolises in the Mangyshlak Peninsula. They date to different periods, with the earliest sites containing tombs from the 8th century while the most recent are from the early 20th century. The mosques are named after the local Sufi saints and are popular pilgrimage sites.

== Tentative list ==
In addition to sites inscribed on the World Heritage List, member states can maintain a list of tentative sites that they may consider for nomination. Nominations for the World Heritage List are only accepted if the site was previously listed on the tentative list. Kazakhstan lists 14 properties on its tentative list.

Tentative sites
Site	Image	Location	Year listed	UNESCO criteria	Description
Turkic Sanctuary of Merke	–	Jambyl Region	1998	(mixed)	The burial and ritual complex represents different stages of the history of the Turkic peoples, from nomadic tribes to the First Turkic Khaganate. It is located at an elevation of 3,000 metres (9,800 ft), and has been well preserved due to its remote location. More than 170 monuments, some containing steles, have been found spread over the mountain plateau.
Northern Tyan-Shan (Ile-Alatau State National Park)	A mountain lake	Almaty Region	2002	x (natural)	The national park in the northern Tian Shan mountains (the Trans-Ili Alatau range) features woodlands, alpine meadows, over 300 glaciers, and mountain lakes (Big Almaty Lake pictured). The park is home to snow leopards, Turkestan lynx, Tian Shan brown bears, beech marten, Siberian ibexes, bearded vultures, golden eagles, as well as numerous butterfly species.
Abylaikit Monastery		East Kazakhstan Region	2021	iii (cultural)	The Buddhist monastery of Abylaikit was built in the Tibetan-Mongolian style in the 1650s. About twenty years later it was destroyed during internal struggles of the Dzungar Khanate, rebuilt, and then remained active until the 1720s. While active, it was the biggest religious and cultural centres in the region and housed a large library of Buddhist texts and relics. Letters from the monastery served as an introduction to the region and to the Vajrayana tradition to Europeans.
Cultural Landscape of Ulytau	A brick mausoleum with a blue roof	Ulytau Region	2021	v (cultural)	The Ulytau Mountains were home to several nomadic cultures, including the Oghuz Turks and the Kipchaks. With the arrival of the Mongols, the area became the burial ground for the descendants of Genghis Khan and the rulers of the Golden Horde (the mausoleum of Jochi pictured), and later the centre of the Kazakh khans. The cultural landscape comprises remains of ancient settlements, fortifications, burial mounds, and rock art sites, well-integrated into the surrounding natural landscape.
Silk Roads: Early Period (Prehistory)		Almaty Region	2021	ii, iii (cultural)	This nomination comprises three sites (Besshatyr, Boralday, and Esik), belonging to the Saka nomadic civilization of the 5th to the 3rd centuries BCE. The archaeological excavations of the tombs, called kurgans, uncovered items such as the Chinese silk and Iranian carpets. This indicates that the trade with these regions predated the formation of the Silk Road with the travels of the Chinese diplomat Zhang Qian in the 2nd century BCE.
Silk Roads: Fergana-Syrdarya Corridor*	People looking at ruins in a desert	Kyzylorda Region, Turkistan Region	2021	ii, iii, v (cultural)	This nomination comprises the sites along the Silk Road that was connecting the Fergana Valley and Zhetysu Region at one side with the Aral Sea at the other side. The caravan route passed through desert, semi-desert, and steppe landscapes, with river valleys and oases. Nine archaeological sites of ancient settlements are listed, including the Otrar oasis (pictured). Excavations at the sites started in the 20th century. Sites along this corridor are also nominated in Kyrgyzstan, Tajikistan, and Uzbekistan.
Silk Roads: Volga-Caspian Corridor	Ruins at a body of water	Atyrau Region, Mangystau Region, West Kazakhstan Region	2021	ii (cultural)	This nomination comprises the sites along the Silk Road that were connecting the Aral Sea with the Caspian Sea and further along the Ural and Volga rivers. The oldest settlement, Kyzylkala, dates to the 10th century, and was abandoned in the 13th century. Saray-Jük (ruins pictured) was an important spiritual centre of the Golden Horde. It declined after the sacking by the Cossacks in the 16th century. Zhayik was occupied between the 13th and 15th centuries.
Ustyurt: Natural Landscape and Aran Hunting Traps		Mangystau Region	2021	iii, v, viii (mixed)	The hunting traps, called aran, were in use in the Ustyurt Plateau from the Bronze Age to the modern period. Taking advantage of the rocky landscape with canyons, cliffs, and holes, people constructed stone corrals to guide packs of wild animals to the trap holes. They were hunting saiga antelopes, mouflons, and goitered gazelles. The area is also important from the geological point of view, containing marine fossils from the Cretaceous period and traces from the animals from the Miocene to Pleistocene periods.
Architectural Resilience: The Anti-seismic Heritage of Almaty	Stalinist building with columns	Almaty	2025	ii, iv (cultural)	As Almaty is located in a seismologically active zone, several of its largest buildings exhibit innovative anti-seismic features developed in the 19th and 20th centuries. The site includes the Ascension Cathedral, House of the Government of the Kazakh SSR (pictured), and Hotel Kazakhstan.
Medeu – Complex of Mudflow Protection Engineering Structures	An ice rink situated in a valley	Almaty	2025	v (cultural)	In the 1960s, the Medeu Dam was built in the Medeu tract to prevent mudflow and regulate seasonal water flow. Its construction involved large-scale use of directed explosions. The Medeu ice rink (pictured) was subsequently built below the dam, with its location in the gorge resulting in ideal conditions for ice skating. The ice rink, constructed in the Soviet modernist style, has also become a symbol of Almaty and Kazakhstan.
Monumental Monuments and Sanctuaries of the Early Steppe Tradition of Central Eurasia (Mausoleum of Kozy-Korpesh–Bayan Sulu, Ritual Structure Dombauyl, and related "Dyng" Towers)	Mudbrick tower	Abai, Kostanay, Kyzylorda, Ulytau regions	2025	iii, iv (cultural)	This nomination comprises several 8th–11th towers of the Kazakh steppe called dyngs, including Dombauyl, Kos-Kyz, Ekidyn, Begim-Ana (pictured), Uzyn-Tam, and Saraman-Kosa towers, as well as the Kozy-Korpesh–Bayan Sulu Mausoleum. These structures reflect the religious practices of the inhabitants of the steppe before the Islamization of the region. The structure and style of these towers built out of stone and brick reflect the development of local architecture in the medieval period.
Petroglyphs of the Karatau Range (Arpaozen and Sauyskandyk)	Animal petroglyphs	Turkistan Region	2025	iii (cultural)	The petroglyphs largely date to the Bronze Age and the Early Iron Age. The carvings were made continuously until the early 20th century. In addition to the petroglyph clusters, both sites include burial grounds, with Arpaozen also including remains of ancient settlements and Sauyskandyk encompassing ritual sites. The sites bear testimony to cultural and religious practices, as well as history and technological developments of the ancient and medieval peoples of southern Kazakhstan.
Petroglyphs of Zhetysu (Kulzhabasy, Eshkiolmes, and Bayan-Zhurek)		Jambyl Region, Jetisu Region	2025	iii (cultural)	Situated in the transitional area between the steppe and the mountains, these rock art concentrations comprise three sites: Kulzhabasy, which also covers ancient settlements, burial sites, and kurgans; Eshkiolmes, one of the best-studied petroglyph collections in the country; and Bayan-Zhurek, noted for scenes of horse sacrifice and solar symbols. Together, these petroglyphs record the traditions, social structure, economy, and religion of the Central Asian steppe cultures that have occupied the region for over three millennia.
Sacred Timber Architecture of Central Asia: Islamic and Christian Traditions at the Turn of the 19th-20th Centuries	Wooden pagoda-like mosque	Almaty, Jetisu Region	2025	ii, iv (cultural)	The Jarkent Mosque (pictured) combines East Asian and local styles, while the Ascension Cathedral reflects the Orthodox tradition with engineering adaptations necessitated by seismic conditions. These wooden structures are notable in an era when masonry and industrial materials prevailed in much of the world and also reflect religious coexistence in a multicultral environment.

== See also ==
- List of Intangible Cultural Heritage elements in Kazakhstan
