= Medeu tract =

Mountain gorge in Almaty, Kazakhstan

Medeu gorge
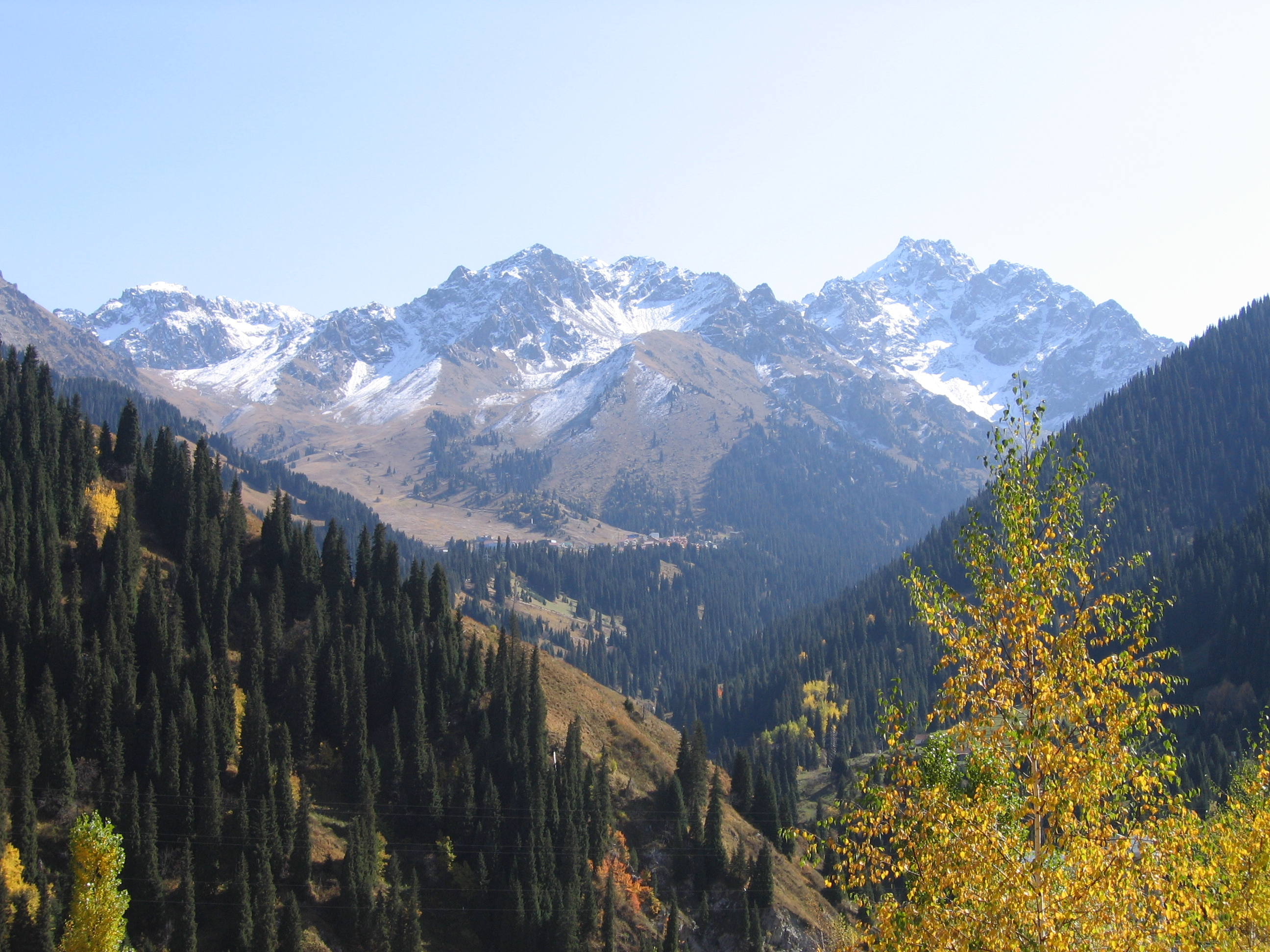
- View from the Medeu Dam
- Floor elevation: 1,520–1,750 m (4,990–5,740 ft)

Geography
- Country: Kazakhstan
- State/Province: Almaty
- Coordinates: 43°9′43″N 77°03′13″E
- Interactive map of Medeu gorge

Medeu Tract (Kazakh: Медеу трактаты, romanized: Medeu traktaty; Russian: урочище Медеу) is a mountain gorge located in the valley of Malaya Almatinka River, in foothills of Trans-Ili Alatau ridge at an altitude of 1520–1750 meters, 14 km to the southeast of center of Almaty. The natural boundaries of gorge territory are: Kimasar mountain spur separating the basins of the Malaya Almatinka and Butakovka rivers, to the east – Kabyrgatau separating the gorges of the Kimasar and Sarysai rivers, to the south-west – Kumbel peak. On territory of the gorge in 1966 a mudflow protection Medeu Dam was built, below which is located the Medeu high-mountain sports complex. The Medeo hotel was formerly located near the Medeu rink, until it was demolished in the early 2000s.

== Geographic features ==
The geographical location of the Medeu gorge, located in a forest-steppe and mountain-forest zones of the Trans-Ili Alatau ridge, determined its mountain climatic characteristics. The average temperature in June is +18.1 °С, in January it's -4.3 °С. The period of below zero temperature is 5–7 months, the duration of frostless period is 151 days, 1596 hours of sunshine per year. Atmospheric pressure is 610–630 mm. Average annual humidity is 50-55%, the amount of precipitation is 843 mm a year. The mountain-valley winds prevail. Average annual temperature of water in Malaya Almatinka river is 5,1 °С. Aspen, Tien Shan fir, hawthorn, rowan, birch and other plants (21 thousand hectares) grow in the forest zone that cover approximately 21 thousand hectares. The road to the Mynzhylky tract runs through the Medeu gorge.

== History ==
The name of the tract in Russian version "Medeo" was established in 1920 by Commissar Dmitry Furmanov. He gave an order to open the first recreation zone "with a facility that uses kumys as a treatment in the building of the former Forest School on Medeo" in the tract.

In 1893 in Verny a certain area belonged to Medeo Pusurmanov. The land for construction near the Kimasar gorge, next to General Gerasim Kolpakovsky's summer cottage, was allocated to Medeu Pusurmanov by the governor of Semirechye. Being an enlightened man, he was one of the first to call Kazakhs to a settled way of life, paying great attention to the improvement of the city of Verny and its surroundings. Medeu Pusurmanov was one of the most active participants in charitable, sponsorship affairs in Verny, and helped financially to restore the city after earthquakes, floods and famine. Hence his authority and popularity among the Verny city officials. On the land allotted to him was built several wooden elite homes, meeting the requirements of those times. These houses were later called the Forest School.

In 1969, on the centenary of the birth of Lenin, on the western slope of Mount Serkebay were planted pine trees in the form of an inscription of 100 years of Lenin. Nowadays the inscription can be seen only from a very high altitude.

In 1973, for the first time in the world, a dam was created in the Medeo gorge by an explosive method, which protected Alma-Ata from the mudflows that descended from the mountain slopes. Later on, a system of water-regulating and mudflow-protecting structures was created.

In 1980, the tract was attached to the city limits of Almaty, forming Medeu district.

In 2007-2011, a gondola cableway to the Shymbulak ski resort was built.

In April 2021 construction of a new hotel was started on the site of a demolished hotel. The territory of the hotel complex is 2,1 hectares. The hotel complex will consist of two 3-storey buildings. Total number of apartments is 137.

== Protection status ==
In 2001, the "Medeu State Regional Nature Park'' was created, which includes parts of the territory of the Medeu tract, Butakovka and Shymbulak gorges. Despite the nature protection status, the territory of the park has been actively developed for high-end residential development, restaurants, cafes and economic activities since the early 2000s. Of the total area of SPNA - 708.1953 hectares, 104.7873 hectares belongs to the extraneous land users. There are 255 land users in the protected area of Medeu Park. As of 2015, there are 155 registered land plots for individuals, 46 for LLPs, 32 for JSCs.

== Nature park status ==
Since 2005, the Medeu gorge, as a unique natural complex and landscape, has been included in the list of environmental protection sites of specific environmental, scientific and cultural significance. Since 2006, Medeu tract as a geomorphological object has been included in the list of objects of the state natural reserve fund of national importance.

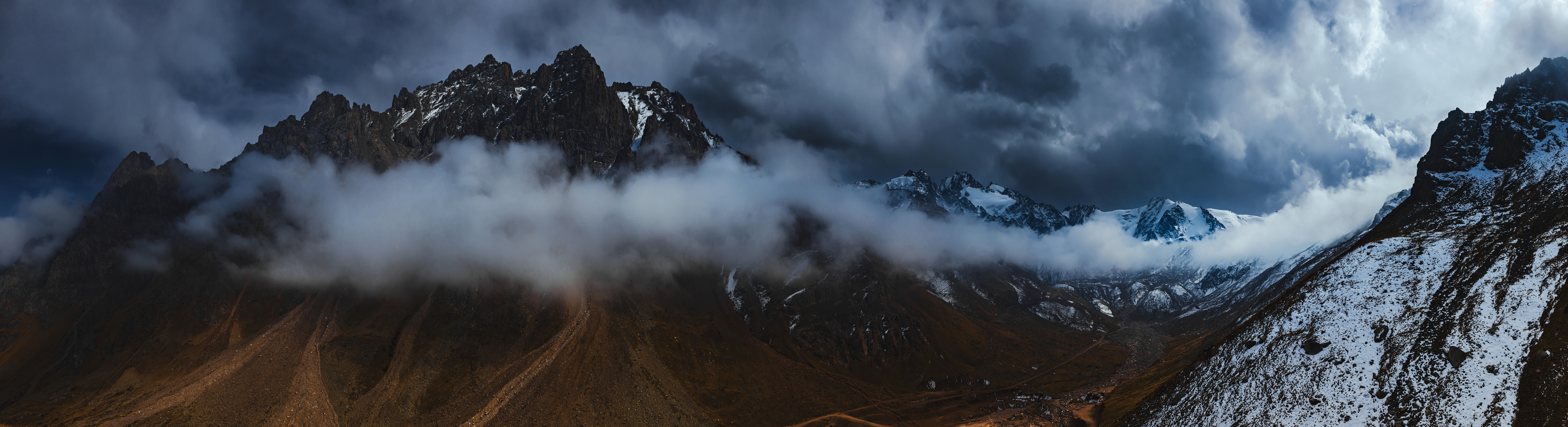
View of mountains in Medeu regional nature park
