= Karatau Petroglyphs =

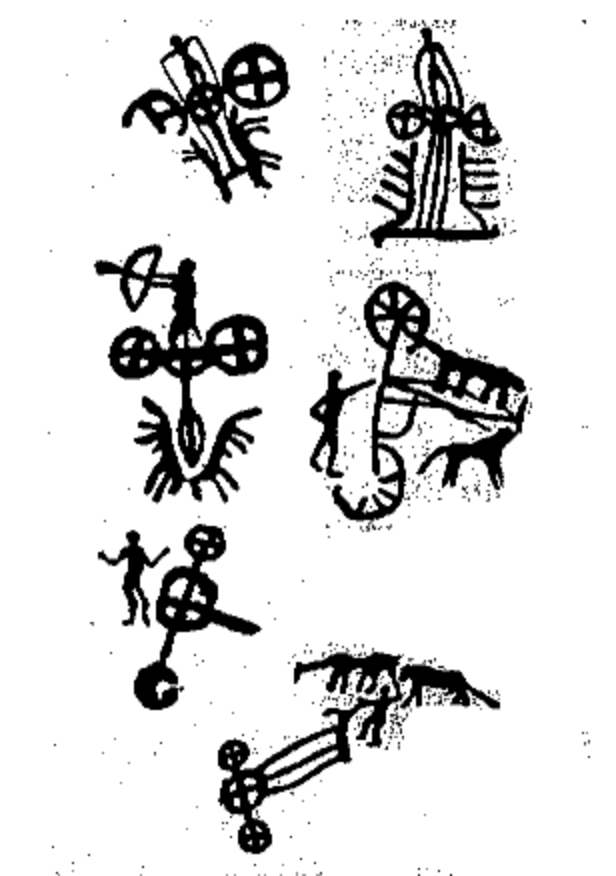
Chariots in the Karatau petroglyphs, dating to the 2nd millennium BC

The Karatau petroglyphs are a group of petroglyphs carved into rock surfaces in the gorges and foothills of the Karatau range, dating primarily to the Bronze Age and the early Iron Age. They have been recorded at numerous localities, including Koibagar, Arpaözen, Maidamtal, Ulkentura, Kysan, Zhyngylshak, Koshkarata, Suyundiksai, and the Aksu-Zhabagly Nature Reserve. Most of these sites are located in the Suzak District of the Turkistan Region, Kazakhstan.

More than 3,000 individual compositions and images have been identified among the Karatau petroglyphs, including 2,765 recorded at Arpaözen. The sites at Maidamtal and Ulkentura have also been the subject of archaeological investigation. The petroglyphs were generally carved onto rocks and boulders of varying sizes.

The carvings depict a wide range of subjects, including wild and domesticated animals, birds, hunting scenes, warriors, and vehicles. Hunting scenes frequently depict mountain goats pursued by dogs, as well as the trapping or catching of birds. Human figures armed with spears or clubs are also represented. The imagery has been interpreted as providing evidence of the economic activities, religious beliefs, customs, and ritual practices of the pastoral and nomadic communities that inhabited the region. Certain animals may also have held symbolic significance; the camel, for example, has been interpreted as representing wealth and strength.

Approximately 50 depictions of war chariots and cargo carts were identified during the final decade of the 20th century. These images constitute one of the most notable groups of representations within the Karatau petroglyphs. Comparable depictions have been recorded elsewhere in Jetysu, including at Tanbaly and Eshkiolmes. The chariots and carts are generally rendered in a similar style, although the animals used to draw them, such as horses or camels, are only rarely depicted.

Taken together, the petroglyphs of the Karatau Mountains constitute an important archaeological and historical source for the study of the material culture and spiritual life of the ancient pastoral communities of the region.

== Arpaözen petroglyphs ==
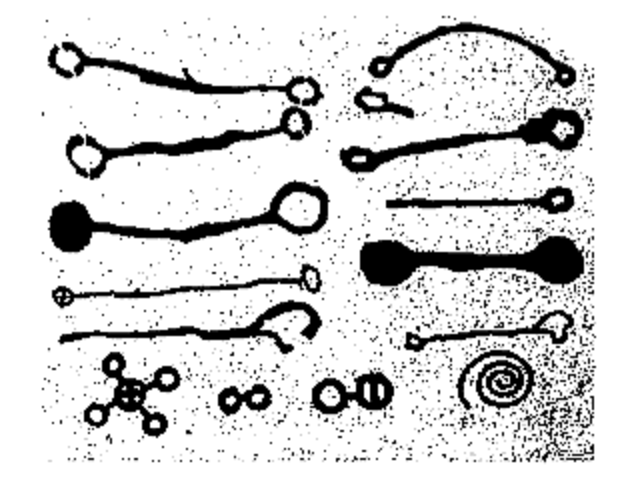
Solar symbols in the Karatau petroglyphs

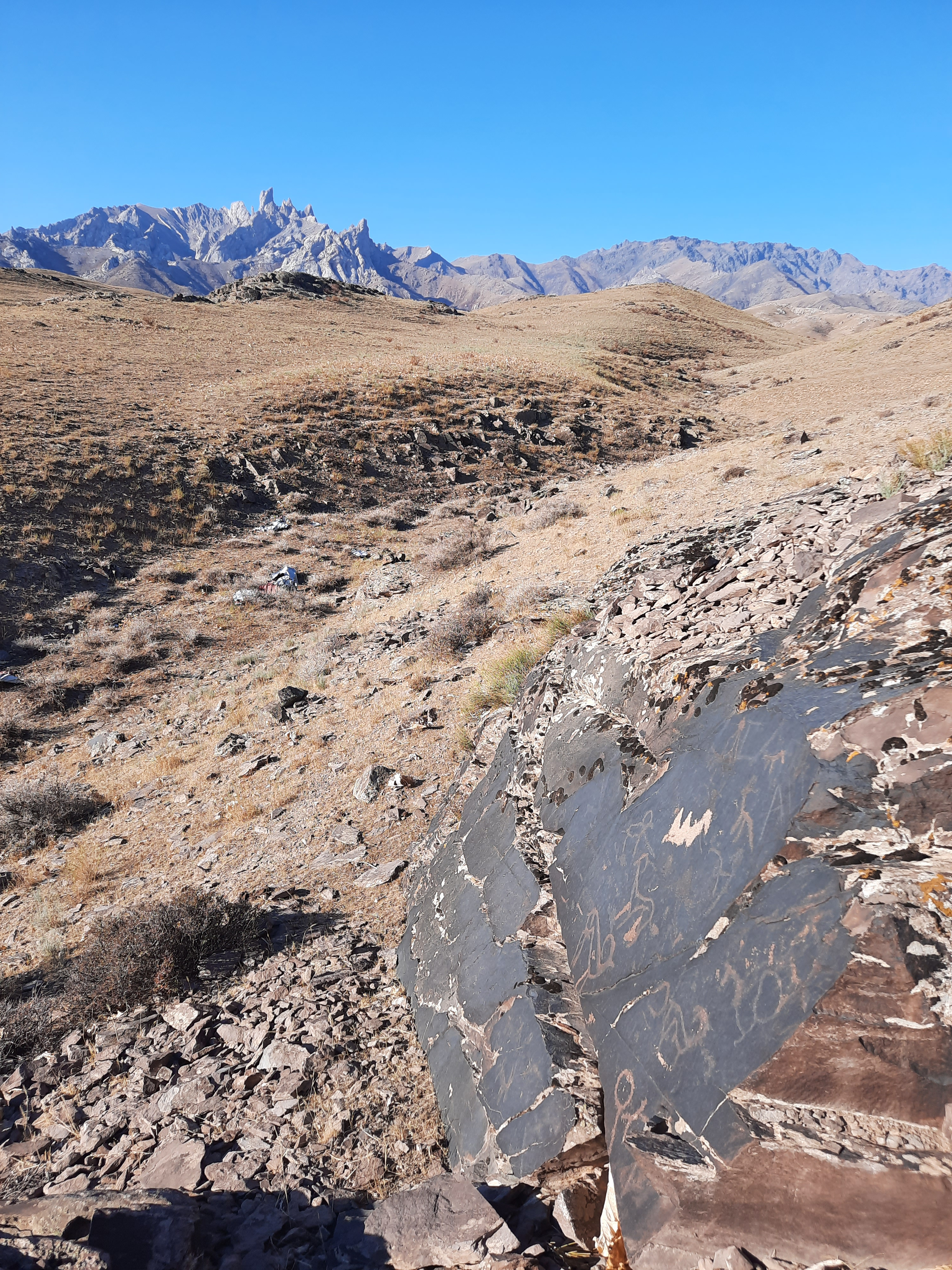
Arpaözen petroglyphs

The Arpaözen petroglyphs are a major group of rock carvings dating from the 2nd to the 1st millennium BC. They are located in the Suzak District of the Turkistan Region, on the slopes of the Kelinshektau range in the Karatau Mountains.

The site was investigated by archaeological expeditions of the Academy of Sciences of Kazakhstan, including expeditions led by M. Kadyrbayev in 1970 and Z. Samashev in 1980. Approximately 3,500 individual images have been recorded at the site. Their subjects include hunting scenes, depictions of warriors, and representations of chariots.

The depictions of war chariots are among the most significant features of the site and have been interpreted as evidence of the importance of warfare in the region during the period in which the carvings were produced.

=== World Heritage Status ===
This site was added to the UNESCO World Heritage Tentative List on September 24, 1998, in the Cultural category. (see List of World Heritage Sites in Kazakhstan)

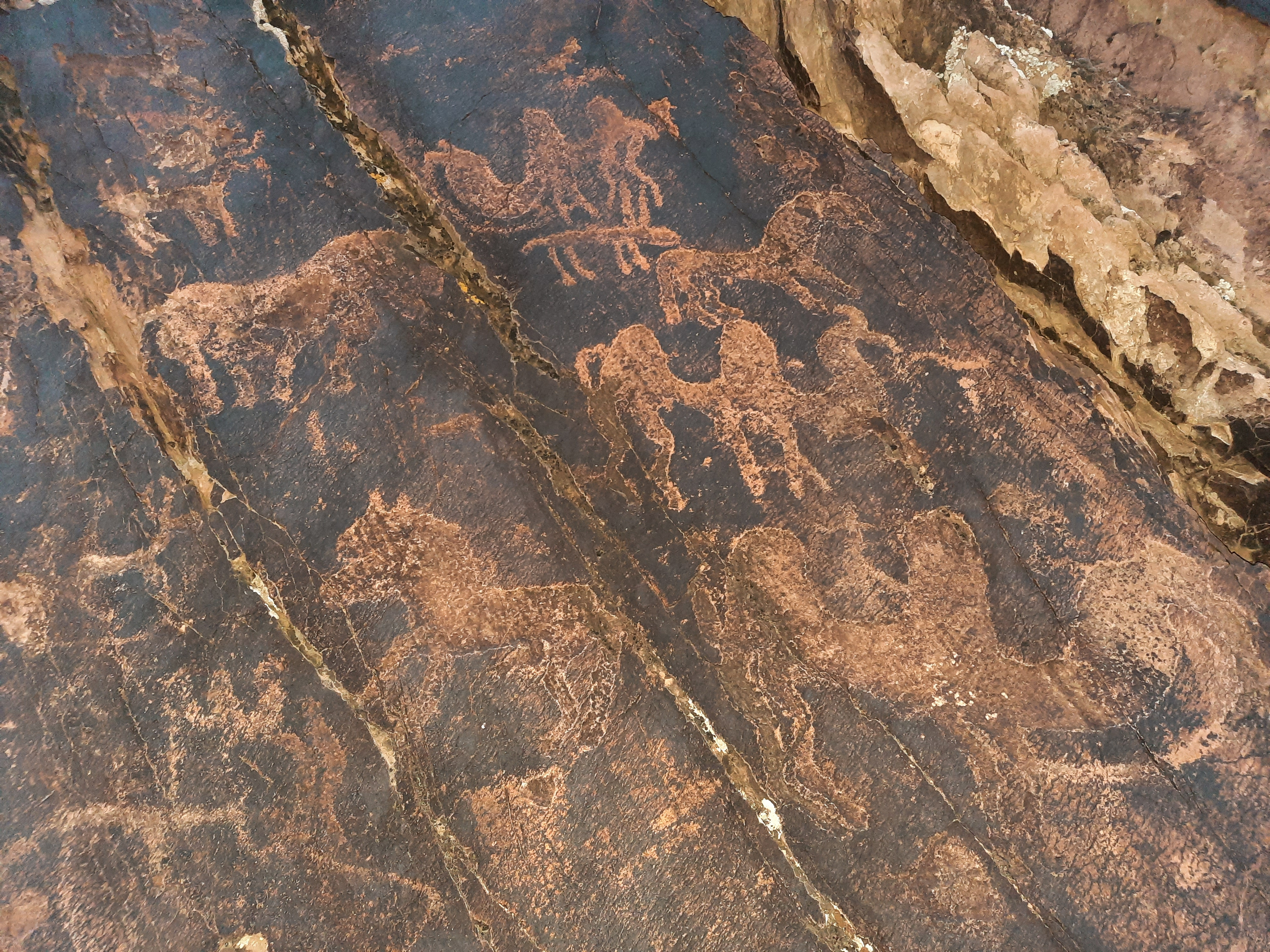
Arpaözen petroglyphs
