= Bayan-Zhurek =

Mountain range in Kazakhstan

Coordinates: 45.136°N 79.284°E

Bayan-Zhurek (Kazakh: Баянжүрек) is a mountain range in Almaty Region, Kazakhstan. The mountains are low, with a maximum elevation of 2079 meters above sea level. The Bayan-Zhurek ridge stretches from west to east over a length of about 20 kilometers. The mountain sits in a plain separated from the high mountains of the Dzungarian Alatau. On the slopes of Bayan-Zhurek, tributaries of the Buyen river originate. The low remnant mountains in the Dzungarian Alatau are composed of shales, limestones and sandstones. The slopes are gentle.

== History ==
Preliminary archaeological work carried out in the valley and in the Bayan-Zhurek mountains has established that this region was inhabited for several epochs, with the largest number of monuments dating back to the early Iron Age. At the end of the XIX century, much work was done by N. N. Pantusov. He discovered petroglyphs in the Bayan-Zhurek mountains, in the Chulak mountains, on the Kurty river, in the Terekty gorge, etc. In addition, many petroglyphs were found on Bayan Zhurek. They are located on the crest of mountains and on the tops of hills on the southwestern edge of the mountain. The Petroglyphs are dispersed over a large area and differ in their location from the rock paintings of Tamgaly in the Anrakai mountains, Saimaluu-Tash in the Ferghana range, or Little (Maly) Usek on the southern slopes of the Dzungarian Alatau, where you can limit and allocate at least approximately the area of the most ancient sanctuary and outline later layers of images. On the topography of petroglyphs of Bayan-Zurek similar figures Holy of Olmeca: they are also concentrated on the hill tops and the top parts of them, and only a small number of them are located in the bottom of the gorge. As in Yeshki-Olmes, the drawings stretch for several kilometers. The petroglyphs of Bayan Zhurek are mainly Bronze and Iron Age. They include pictures of humans, including to figures with huge headdress that are interpreted as shamans. The pictures of chariots, riders, camels, horses and other animals are also found there.

== Location ==
Bayan Zhurek is a mountain 15 km from Kapal located on the territory of Aksu district of Almaty region and has a favorable acoustic environment (silence, melodic sounds in nature). For a comfortable visit to the natural monument, the best months are from May to September. There is no tourist infrastructure on the territory of the monument. There are various options for passing the route in this area: trekking, jeep tour, bike ride.

== Local legend ==
Hummocky mountains have long attracted people for its climate. So, Asan Kaigy Asan Kaigy after a trip to Bayan-Zhurek said: "There will never be jute in the Bayanzhurek mountains, if horses grazed on the Bank of the Buyen for six years, then tulpars would be born."

== Sources ==
- M. Ginatullin linguistic and Local history dictionary. - Almaty: Rarity, 2010
- A. P. Gorbunov Mountains Of Central Asia. Explanatory dictionary of geographical names and terms. Almaty, 2006
- Tashbayeva, Kadicha (2001): Petroglyphs of Central Asia - International Institute for Central Asian Studies Samarkand; Bishkek. Also available Open Access: https://www.unesco-iicas.org/book/63 pp. 156–166
