= Cable car Medeu - Shymbulak =

Cable car in Kazakhstan

Shymbulak cableway
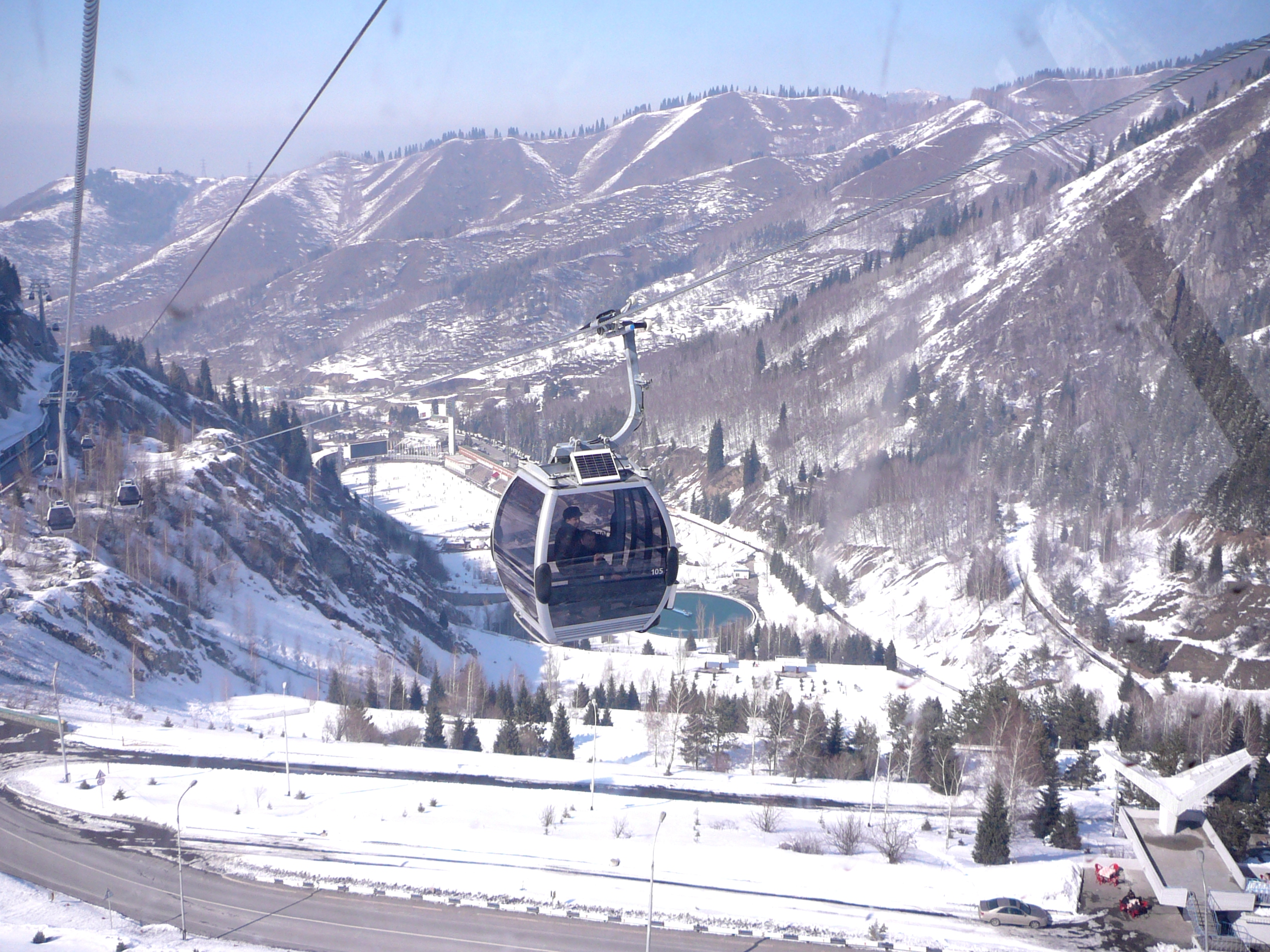
- Interactive map of Shymbulak cableway

Overview
- Status: In operation
- Location: Almaty
- Country: Kazakhstan
- Open: 2011

Technical features
- Line length: 4500 m

The cable car Medeu - Shymbulak (Russian: Канатная дорога Медеу - Чимбулак, tr. Kanatnaya doroga Medeu - Shymbulak) is a cable car located in Almaty, Kazakhstan. It links the sports complex "Medeu" and the ski resort "Shymbulak", going through the Medeu tract. It was opened in 2011.

== Construction ==
Construction of the gondola lift in preparation for the 2011 Asian Games began in July 2007. It was planned that construction would be completed in December of the same year. The project provides for intercepting parking to the Medeu stadium. The Austrian company Doppelmayr was involved in the implementation of the gondola lift project.

As of 2009, the cable car was not completed, the work practically stopped, some of the work was carried out by a Turkish construction company. Availability was estimated at 65%, one support was not installed and the lower station was not built. It was noted that the upper station of the road was almost ready and snow guns were purchased. The completion date was November 2010.

In October 2010, the work of the new transport system was carried out in test mode.

== Characteristic ==
The cable car has a length of 4.5 km from the "Medeu" sports complex to the "Shymbulak" ski resort. On the new gondola road, the ascent to the ski slopes takes no more than 15 minutes. The line can operate up to 115 eight-seat cabins. The speed of movement is 5 meters per second and the throughput is up to 2,000 people per hour.

The cable car is an important link with the Shymbulak resort. This becomes especially noticeable when, as a result of avalanches or mudslides, road communication with Medeu is blocked – in May 2016 the road was closed for 24 hours.

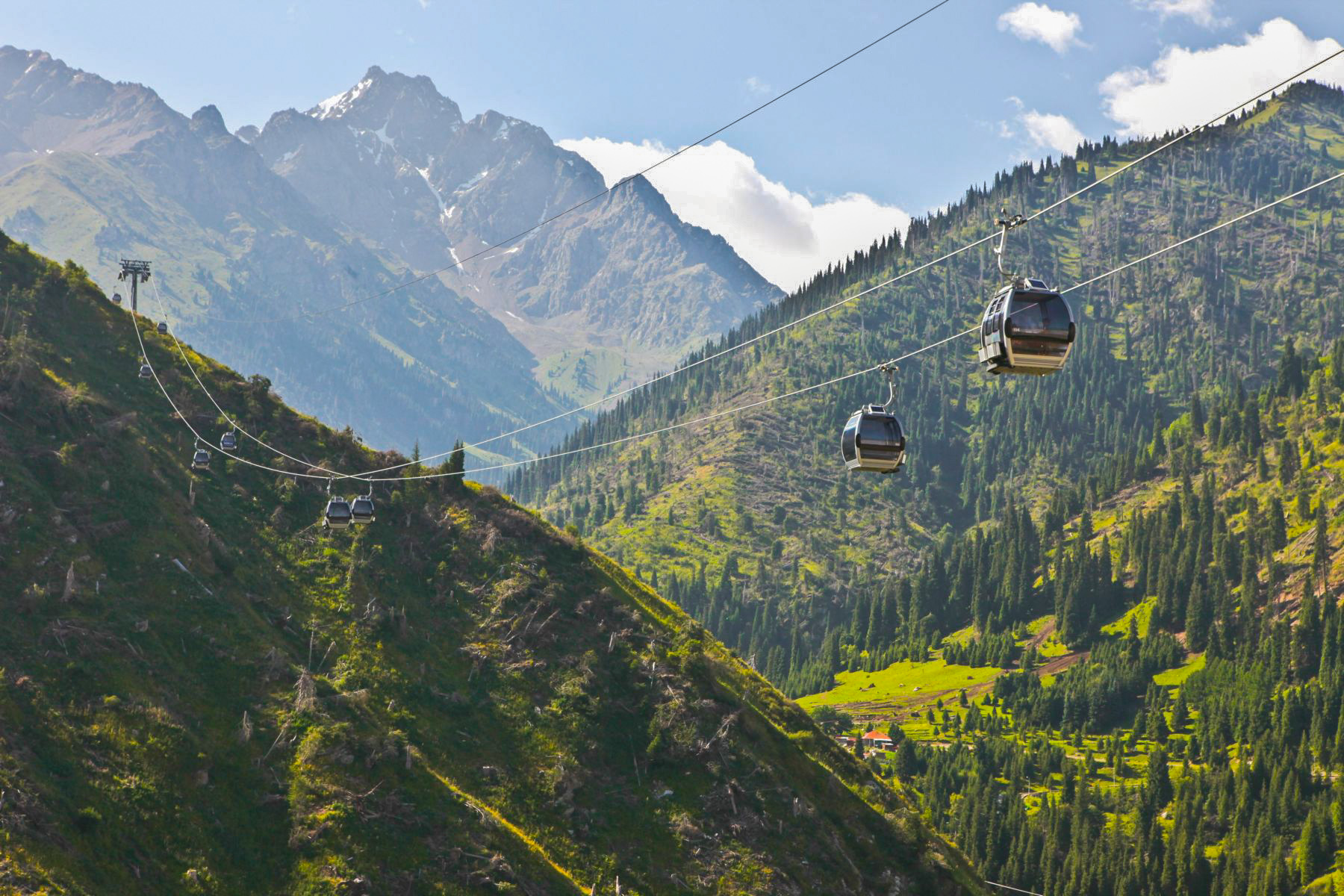
Road along the slope

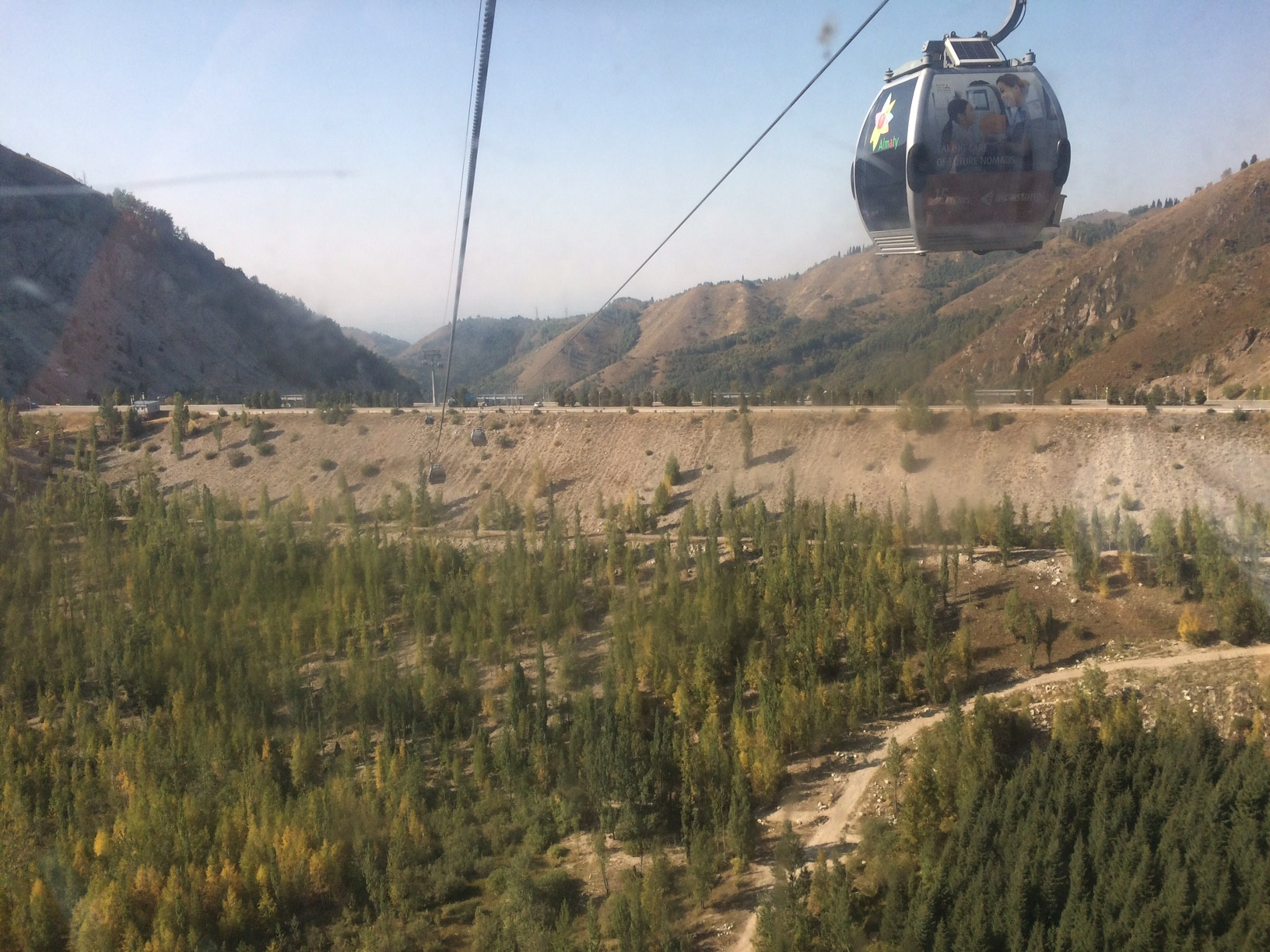
A cabin over the village storage room

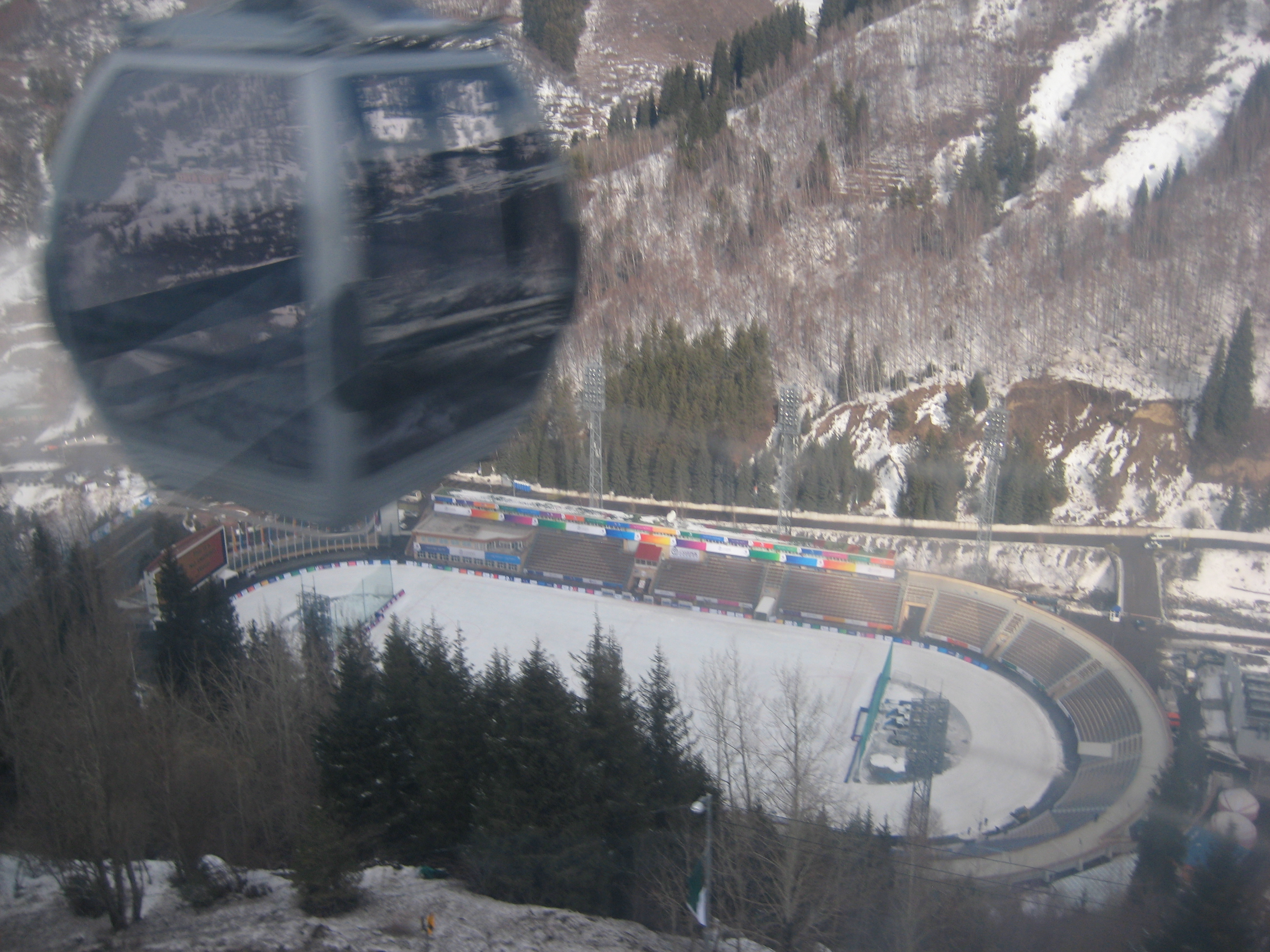
Medeu Sports Complex

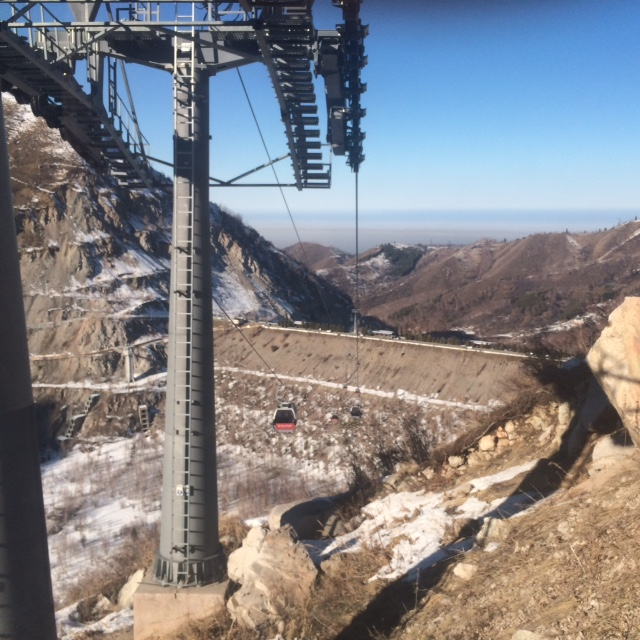
Mudflow protection dam

== Incidents ==
In January 2017, after the competition at the Shymbulak resort, people got stuck in the cabins of the cable car. The line was suspended several times. The cause of the malfunction was the triggering of the rope position control sensor.

== Ticket prices ==
The cost of lifting in both directions: Adult - 3,500 tenge. Youth (up to 23 years old) - 2,500 tenge Children under 10 years old - 1,500 tenge. Children under 5 years old, retirees, disabled people - free of charge 1 (one) ticket per day.
