= Merke Turkic Sanctuaries =

The Turkic Sanctuaries of Merke (Kazakh: Мерке түрік ордасы, romanized: Merke türik ordası) are located in southern Kazakhstan, roughly 37 km south of present-day Merke in the Jambyl Province. At 3000 m high, the sanctuaries in this mountainous region of Kirghizki Alatau number more than 170 over nearly 250 km^{2}. The sites are well-preserved at the moment due to their isolation and relative difficulty of access. Each site may include small stelae (one to four), possibly representing the ancestors buried underneath.

== World Heritage Status ==
This site was added to the UNESCO World Heritage Tentative List on September 24, 1998, in the Mixed (Cultural & Natural) category.

== See also ==
- List of World Heritage Sites in Kazakhstan
