= Eshkiolmes Petroglyphs =

The Petroglyphs of Eshkiolmes (Kazakh: Ешкіөлмес петроглифтері, romanized: Eşkiölmes petroglïfteri) are located throughout the Eshkiolmes mountain range in the Almaty region of Kazakhstan. The area is being considered for inscription on the World Heritage list of sites who have "outstanding universal value" to the world.

== Site description ==
The petroglyphs are the most outstanding features of this area that also includes ancient Late Bronze to Middle Age settlements and burials. There exist over 4000 extant well-preserved petroglyphs in this area, that employ a wide range of techniques and content. The rock art often depicts even the most minute detail of ancient life, including the depiction of clothes and tools.

== World Heritage status ==
This site was added to the UNESCO World Heritage Tentative List on September 24, 1998 in the Mixed (Cultural + Natural) category.

== See also ==
- List of World Heritage Sites in Kazakhstan
