= Medeu =

Outdoor speed skating and bandy rink in Almaty, Kazakhstan

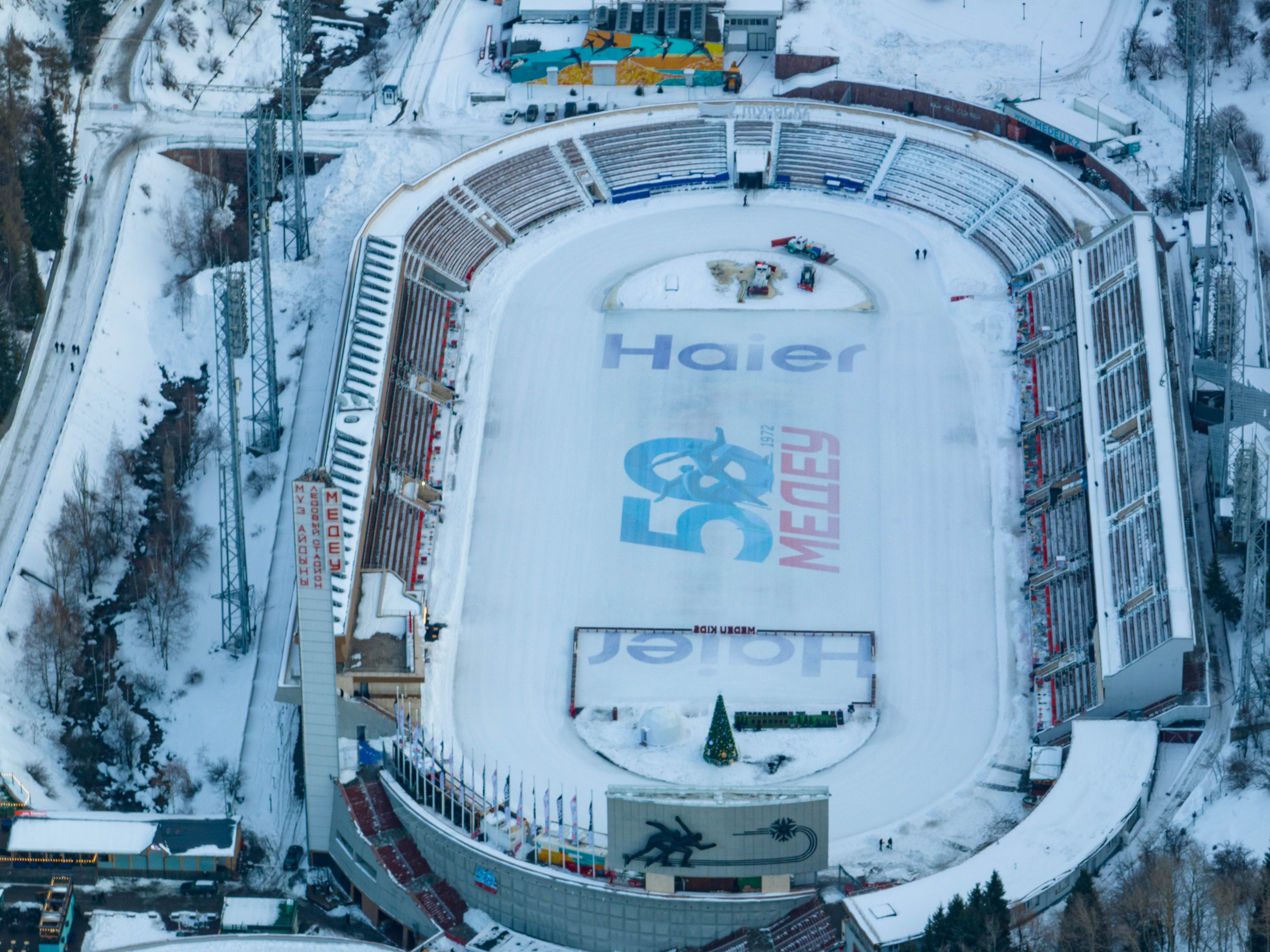
- Medeu ice rink (aerial view)
- Interactive map of Medeu
- Location: Almaty, Kazakhstan
- Coordinates: 43°09′27″N 77°03′31″E
- Owner: City of Almaty
- Capacity: 8,500

Construction
- Built: 1949–1951
- Opened: 1951
- Renovated: 1972, 2003, 2009
- Cost: 19.4 billion tenge (approx. 131.8 million $)

Tenants
- 2011 Asian Winter Games, 2012 Bandy World Championship, 2017 Winter Universiade

The Medeu (Kazakh: Медеу [mʲedʲéw]) is an outdoor speed skating and bandy rink. It is located in Medeu Valley on the southeastern outskirts of Almaty, Kazakhstan. Medeu sits 1,691 m (5,548 ft) above sea level. It consists of 10,500 m^{2} of ice and utilizes a sophisticated freezing and watering system to ensure the quality of the ice.

== History ==
The Medeu is a high-altitude sports complex near Almaty, located at an altitude of 1,691 meters above sea level. It is considered to be the world's largest high-mountain skating rink. The skating rink was named after the Maloalmatinsky volost Medeu Pusurmanov. He built three wooden huts for the wintering of his family there, and began the development of the tract in the foothills of the Zailiysky Alatau. Medeu became a well-known entrepreneur, patron of educational institutions, and participated in the planting of the city.

In 1930, a sanatorium was opened in the area named "MDO" (Local holiday home). Construction of the skating rink began in the fall of 1949, and the first competition took place at the stadium on 4 February 1951. The capital of the Kazakh SSR was responsible for building the new skating rink. The complex was meant to prepare athletes for competitions in the highlands. The site was chosen by a special commission from Moscow. The construction of the Medeu rink involved over 1,300 workers.

On the opening day of the skating rink (5 February 1951), it established two world and six all-Union records. During the opening ceremony, a traditional parade of athletes was held, honoring the veteran skaters. For the following 17 seasons, 47 world records were established on the ice rink. The level of solar radiation in the area, as well as low pressure and a weak wind were thought to be key aspects in numerous world records being broken at the complex. Also, the ice used on the skating rink was thought to be an important factor as it was composed of water from Malya Almatinka (providing high sliding speeds).

In 1972, the Medeu started its own system of artificial ice. This was carried out by a team of Soviet engineers (and remains until the present). The site's artificial ice covers the entire site (a total of 10.5 thousand square meters). The Ministry of Highways renovated and asphalted the road from Abai Avenue to the Medeu, building two bridges through Malaya Almatinka. The Medeu eventually evolved from a sports facility into a major recreation space.

In the stands, the complex seated 10.5 thousand people. The complex also included cloakrooms, buffets designed for 500 people, a hotel for athletes, a bottling room, a room with a film projector, rooms for judges, a press center, a bathhouse and rental points for skates. In 1974, Medeu hosted the European Speed Skating Championships in its arena. In the second half of the 80s, it was closed for reconstruction, stretching for seven years.

=== Reconstruction ===
From September 2001 to December 2002, a reconstruction of the Medeu was carried out. During this time a new refrigerating plant was installed by the Finnish company BG International. This involved 140 km of pipelines, and filling a new concrete foundation in the field. The main part of engineering systems was replaced, a new refrigerating station was installed. Builders also increased the comfort of the stands, reducing their capacity to 8.100 people.

The Medeu was fully renovated in 2011 for the Asian Winter Games, and became a major training base for the ice skaters of the USSR. Over 200 speed world records were set there in numerous sports, including speed skating and others. Medeu remains an important centre for the training of winter sports athletes from Kazakhstan and other regions. Over 120 World Records have been documented there in numerous sports, including speed skating and others. In 1972, the rink made a transition from natural ice rink to artificial ice rink.

The other main attraction at Medeu is the dam across the valley. The Medeu Dam, built in the late 1960s, is located south of the skating rink. The dam has 3 successive altitude levels. Special water reservoir allows holding of approximately 6 million cubic meters of water. Stairs consisting of 842 steps were built to access the dam. The dam was built to protect Almaty from potential stone and mudflows precipitated by rains and thawing of snow. The dam was called into action in 1973, when some 4.5 million cubic metres of water and debris, flooding down the gorge, were stopped short here.

=== 2011 Winter Asian Games ===
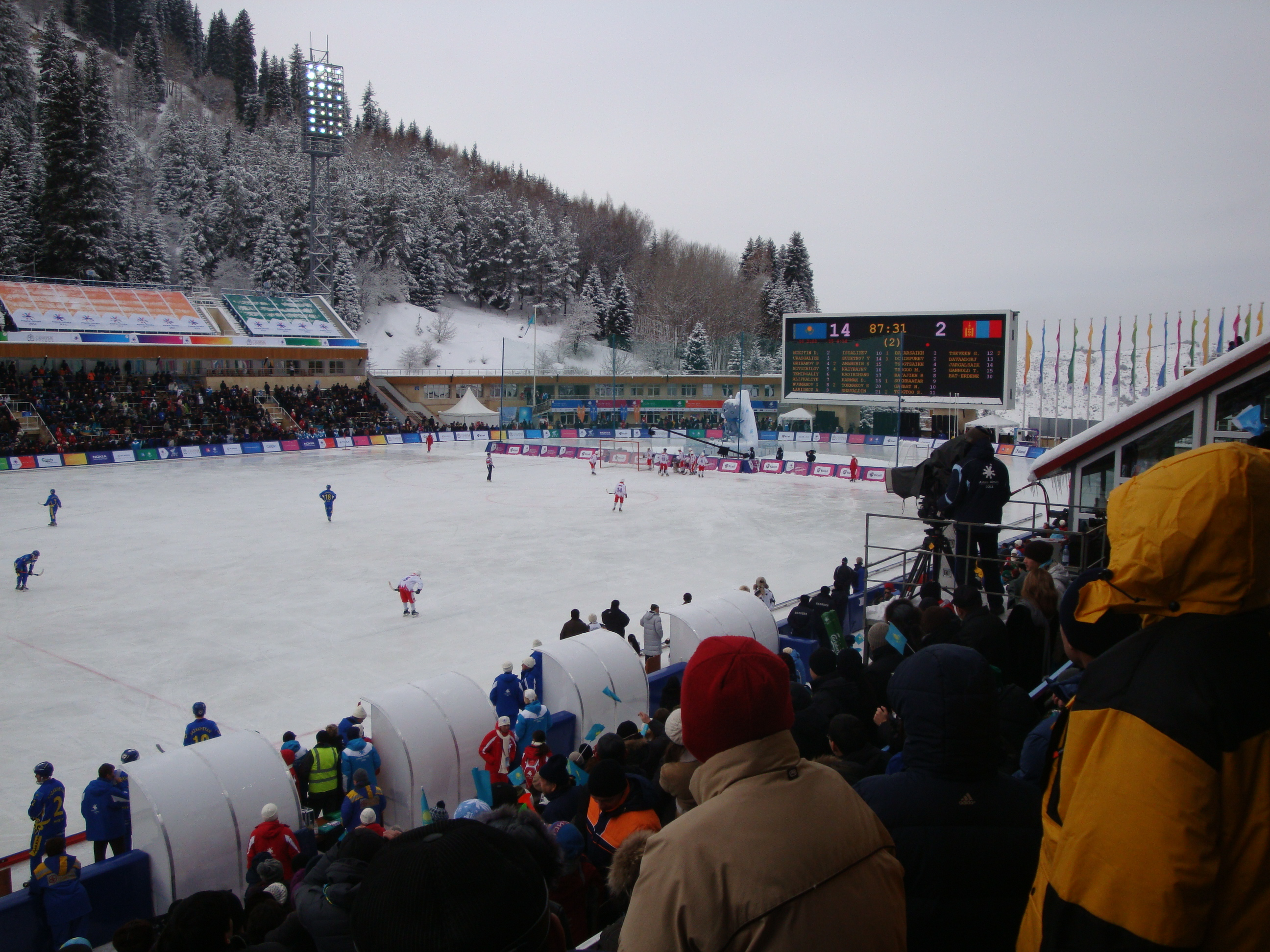
The final of the bandy tournament at 2011 Asian Winter Games between Kazakhstan and Mongolia, which was attended by President Nursultan Nazarbayev.

On 4 March 2006, Kazakhstan received the right to host the 2011 Asian Games. The Winter Asian Games were the largest scale competition ever to take place in Kazakhstan, and took place from 30 January until 6 February (2006). While a large portion of the events took place in Astana, Almaty hosted a number of the events, including ski jumping, cross-country skiing, and others. Medeu was set to host bandy.

As a result, in 2009 the Medeu stadium was renovated, reopening on 16 December after undergoing 19.4 billion tenge (US$131.8 million) in construction costs.

The Medeu stadium and ski resort Shymbulak underwent major reconstruction during the preparations for 2011 Asian Winter Games. Most of their engineering and technical systems were replaced. It also incorporated a new refrigeration station for cooling the ice. It established a new multimedia display area of 200 m^{2}. Capacity of spectator stands increased to 8500 seats.

=== 2012 Bandy World Championship ===
From 29 January to 5 February 2012, the XXXII Bandy World Championship took place at the Medeu. The right to host the WCS was given to Kazakhstan on 28 January 2011 at the congress of the Federation of International Bandy (held in Kazan). Fourteen teams attended the world championship. In the final game, the Russian team lost to the Swedish team (4:5). The Kazakh team won the third place by defeating the Finnish team (10:5).

=== Current use ===
Medeu maintains its status as one of the best-known tourist locations in Kazakhstan. The stadium is open to the public all year round, allowing visitors to skate at high altitude day or night. During night hours, skaters can enjoy music and lights in the stadium either from the ice, or from VIP boxes available for rent.

The Medeu Stadium and Dam serve as the turnaround point for Almaty's International Medeu-marathon. Competitors run from city to stadium--an elevation gain of nearly 1000 meters--before returning to Almaty to finish the race.

The 2017 Winter Universiade took place in Almaty; for which Medeu was used for speed skating.

On 1 June 2022, Medeu opened its summer roller skating season. The stadium switched to a year-round format. 450 square meters were allocated for an indoor ice court, the rest of the space was taken by a rollerdrome. The team of street art artists "Repas" realized an ambitious art project by creating in the center of the arena the biggest in Central Asia horizontal graffiti with an area of 4,000 square meters. On the south bend there is a photo-zone dedicated to the history of the stadium. Its main characters are the people who made Medeu a reality. Here you can find images of Kudryavtsev, Kunayev, and Pusurmanov.

== Competitions and significant events at Medeu HMSC ==
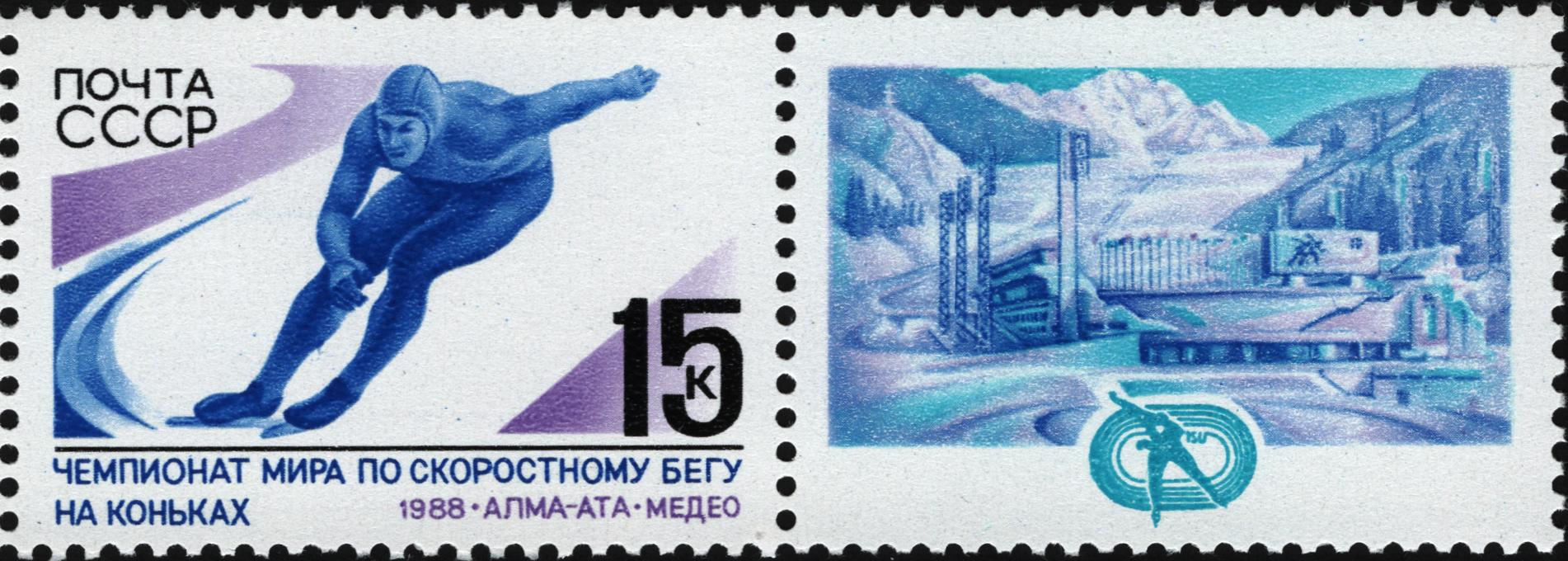
Stamp for 1988 World Allround Speed Skating Championships for Men

- 1974 - The Fifth European Championship in speed skating among women.
- 1977 - USSR Hockey Championship - winner "Dynamo" (Alma-Ata).
- 1977 - European Champions Cup in bandy - winner "Dynamo" (Alma-Ata).
- 1982 - Festival of song, dance and sports on the 250th anniversary of the accession of Kazakhstan to Russia.
- 1984 - The Ninth European Championship in speed skating among women.
- 1988 - 81st World Championship in speed skating in classical all-round events (men).
- 1989 - The final of the Individual World Championships in Motorcycling on Ice.
- 1990 - The final of the World Team Championship in motorcycling on ice.
- 1990 - The USSR Hockey Championship - the winner of "Dynamo" (Alma-Ata).
- 1990 to 2004 - Annual summer pop competition "Asia Dauysy".
- 2011 - Asian Winter Games 2011, bandy competitions were held under the program of the VII Winter Asian games (the final of Kazakhstan - Mongolia was attended by former President Nursultan Nazarbayev).
- 2012 - The 32nd World Bandy Championship, the winners - Sweden, Russia, Kazakhstan.
- 2014 (18–21 December) - World University Speed Skating Championships.
- 2017 - Winter Universiade 2017.
- 2020 - USSR Hockey Legends match against Kazakhstan Hockey Veterans.
- 2020 - Ice Speedway World Championship Finals.
- 2021 - Kazakhstan Speed Skating Cup.

== Tourism ==
There are several hiking trails that originate from the Medeu main bus stop. There is access to the Shymbulak Skiing resort from the Medeu cable car station. This involves a 15–20 minute scenic ride above the area's mountain tops and rivers. Kimassar trail is a 2 hour hike to the top of Furmanov Peak, where hikers have access to swinging on iconic wooden swings. Kok-Zhailyau trail is a 3 hour hike, and leads to hot springs with thermal water (the place is equipped with changing booths, tiny thermal water pool and outdoors gym). Shymbulak trail is a 2 hour hike, and leads to Shymbulak Skiing resort.

From 14 October 2021, on the territory of the complex there is a parking lot for public electric transport, for the carriage of passengers along the route "Medeo-Shymbulak".

== Gallery ==
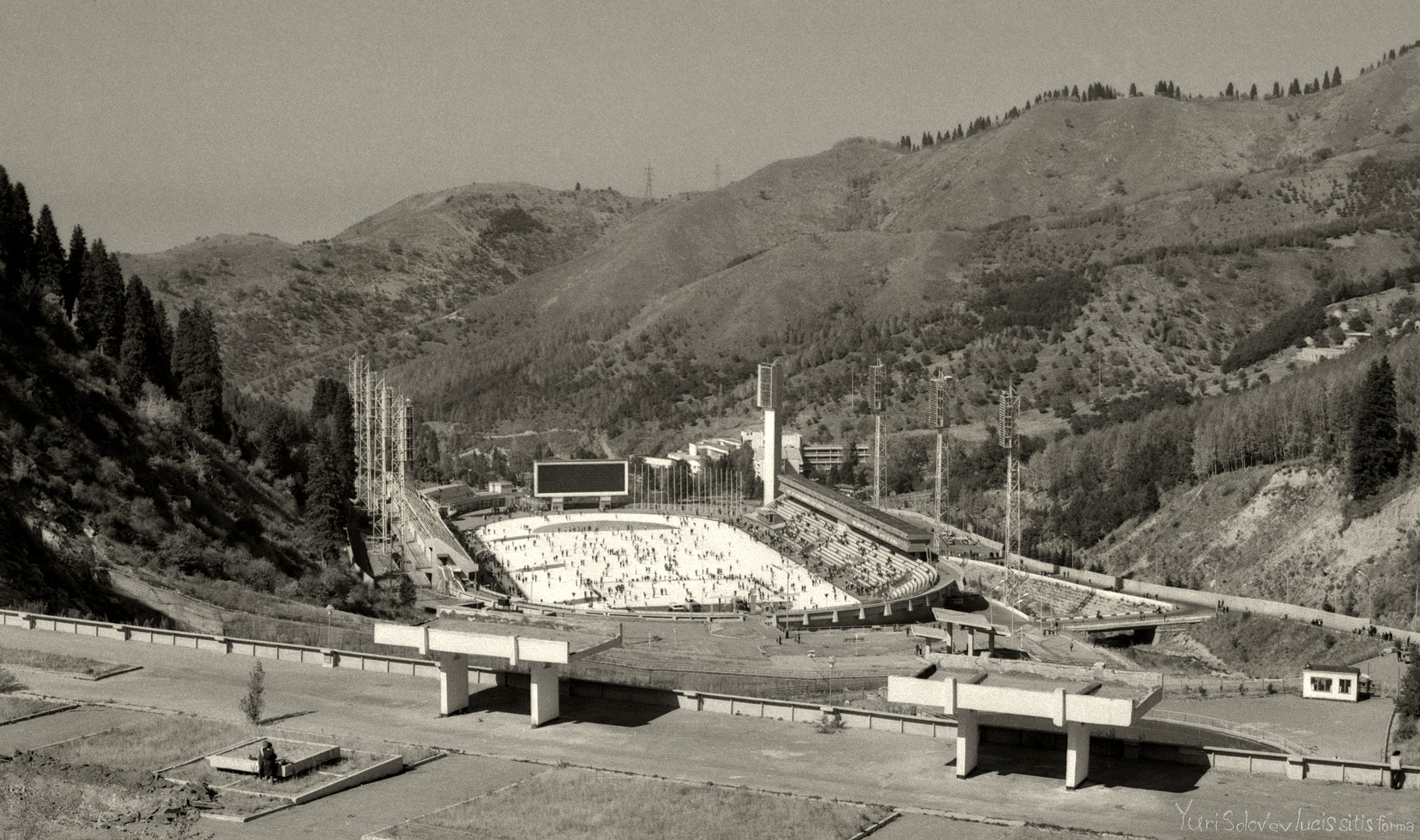

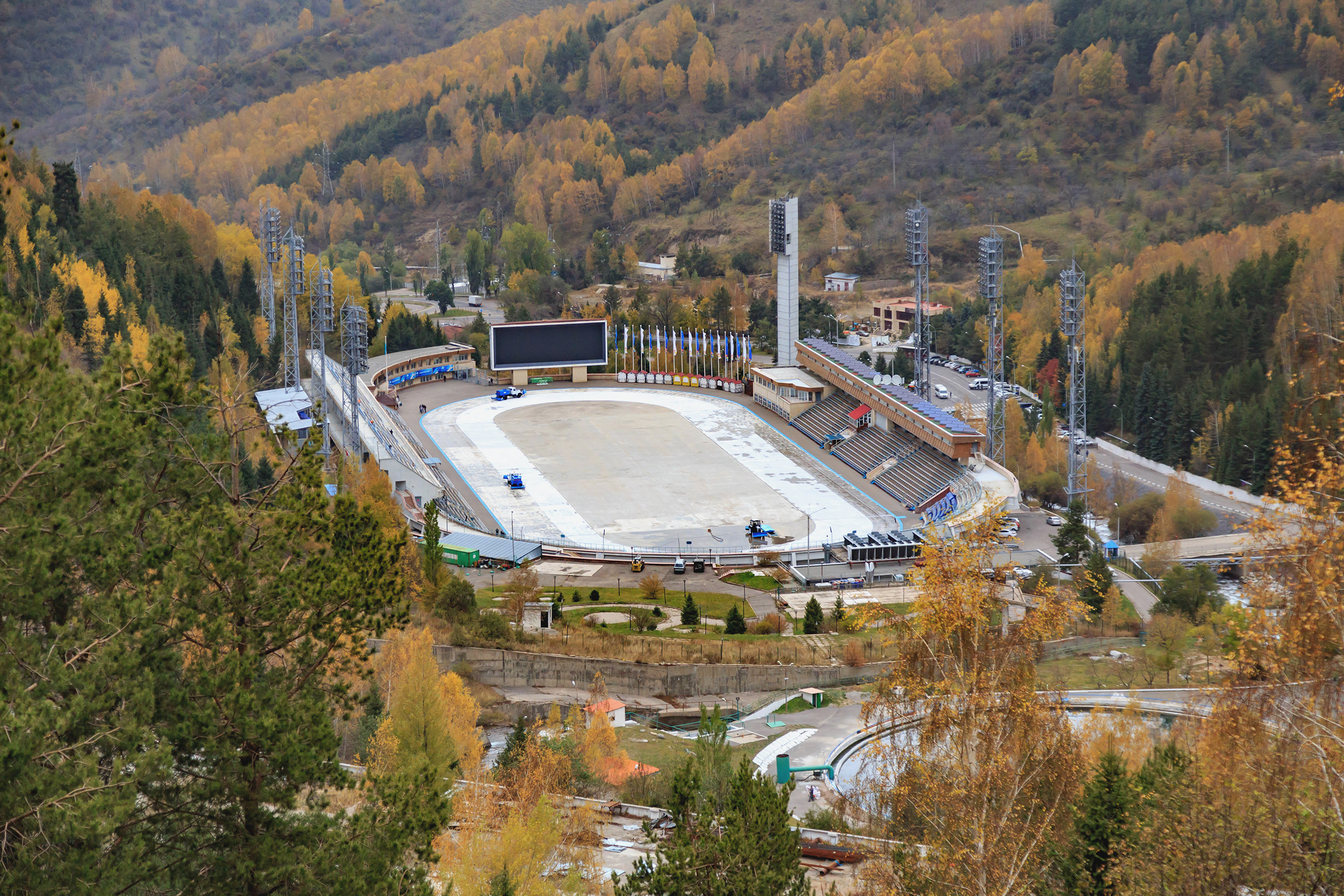

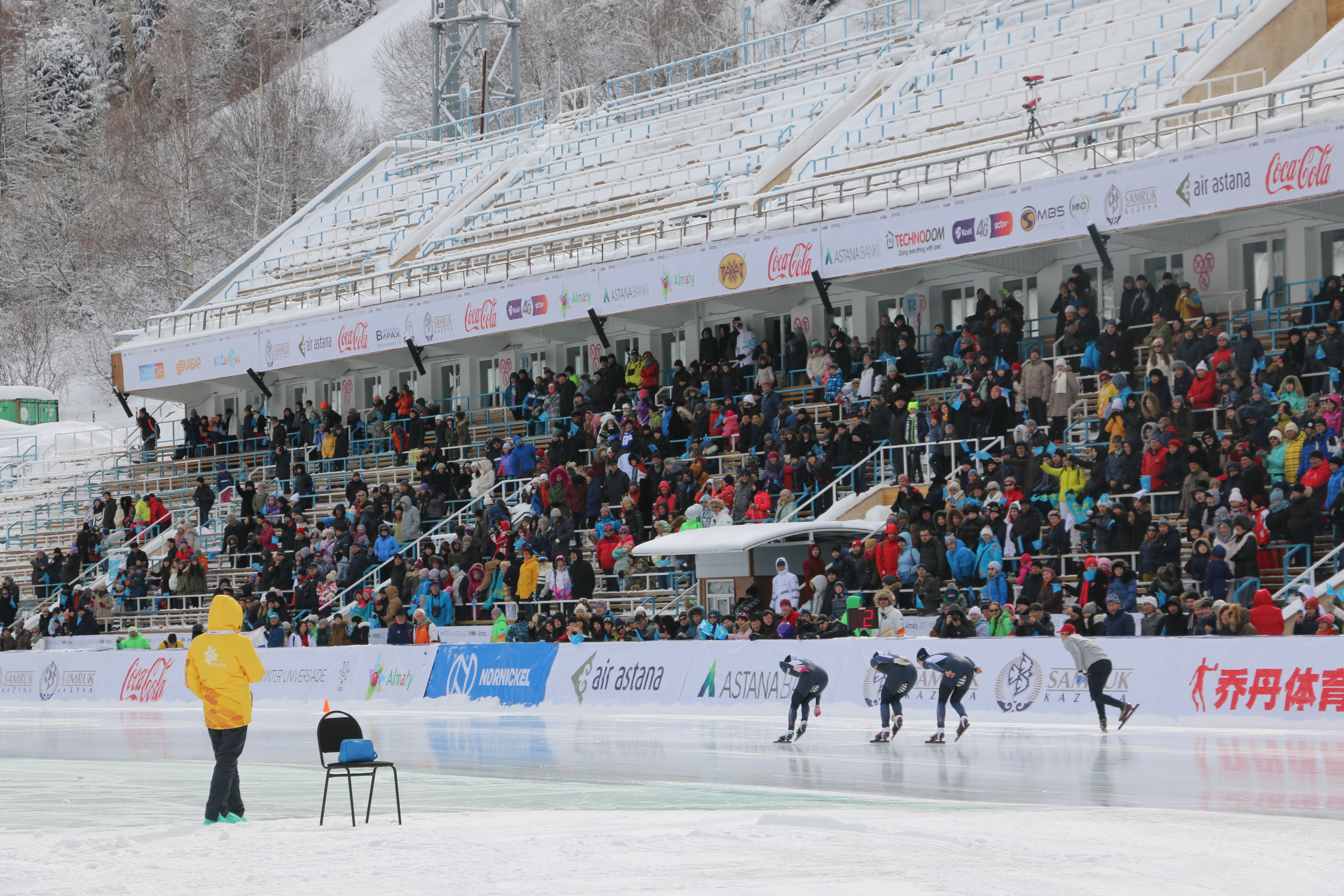

Events and tenants
Preceded by Trudovye Rezervy Stadium; Kazan	Bandy World Championship; Final Venue; 2012	Succeeded by Arena Vänersborg; Vänersborg
