= Medeu Dam =

Dam in Kazakhstan

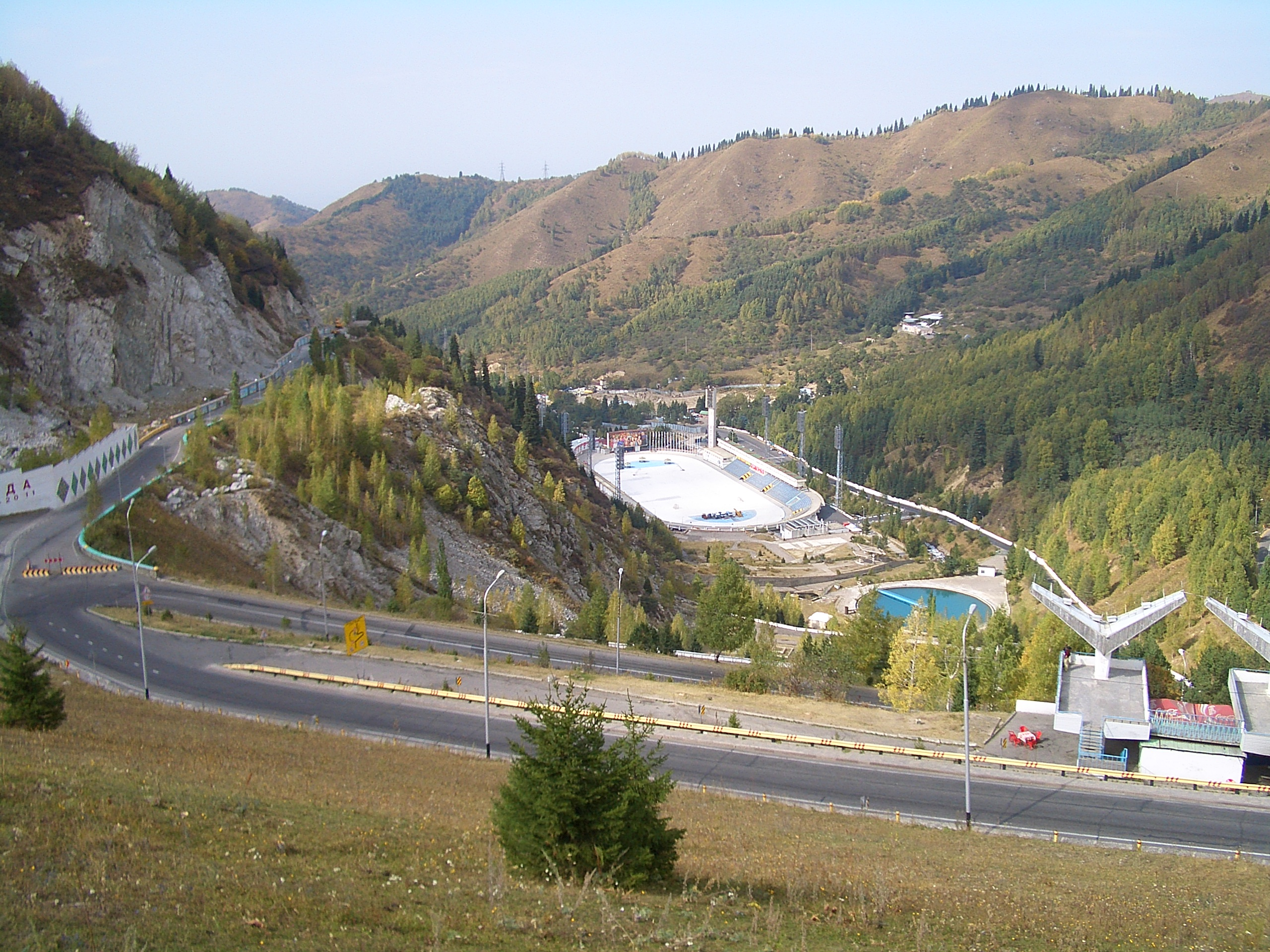
Looking down from Medeu Dam, toward the Medeu Skating Rink to the north

The Medeu Mudflow Control Dam (Kazakh: Медеу бөгеті, Medeý bógeti) is a dam across the Medeu Valley south-east of Almaty, Kazakhstan, designed to protect the city from devastating debris flows (or mudflows).

== The mudflow threat ==
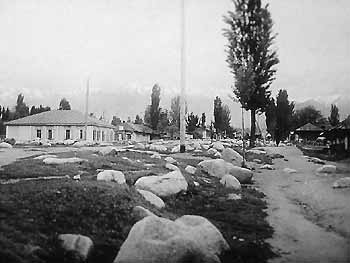
In the aftermath of the 1921 Malaya Almatinka debris flow. This is the kind of event that the Medeu Dam is designed to prevent

Much of downtown Almaty is built on the alluvial fan of the Small Almaty, at the point where the river leaves the steep and narrow Medeu Valley for the wider plain. The river valley, steeply descending to the city from the Trans-Ili Alatau mountains, is highly susceptible to the formation of debris flows and/or mudflows. During the 20th century, five catastrophic debris/mudflows happened in the valleys of the Small Almaty or its sister river (further west), the Big Almaty. The most severe of them was the catastrophic mudflow of 1921 in the Small Almaty valley, triggered by heavy rainfall. It killed 500 people out of Almaty's 45,000 population at the time, and destroyed much of the city. The total volume of that flow is thought to have been 10 million cubic meters (including some 3 million cubic meters of hard material, i.e. rock), coming down to the city at the discharge rate of 900 cubic meters per second. It is estimated that if a repetition of the 1921 mudflow were to strike the city in the early 21st century, the damage would be on the order of US $100 million.

To prevent mudflows from reaching the city, a number of facilities have been built upstream of the city on both the Bolshaya (Greater) and Malaya (Lesser) Almatinka Rivers.

== Dam history ==
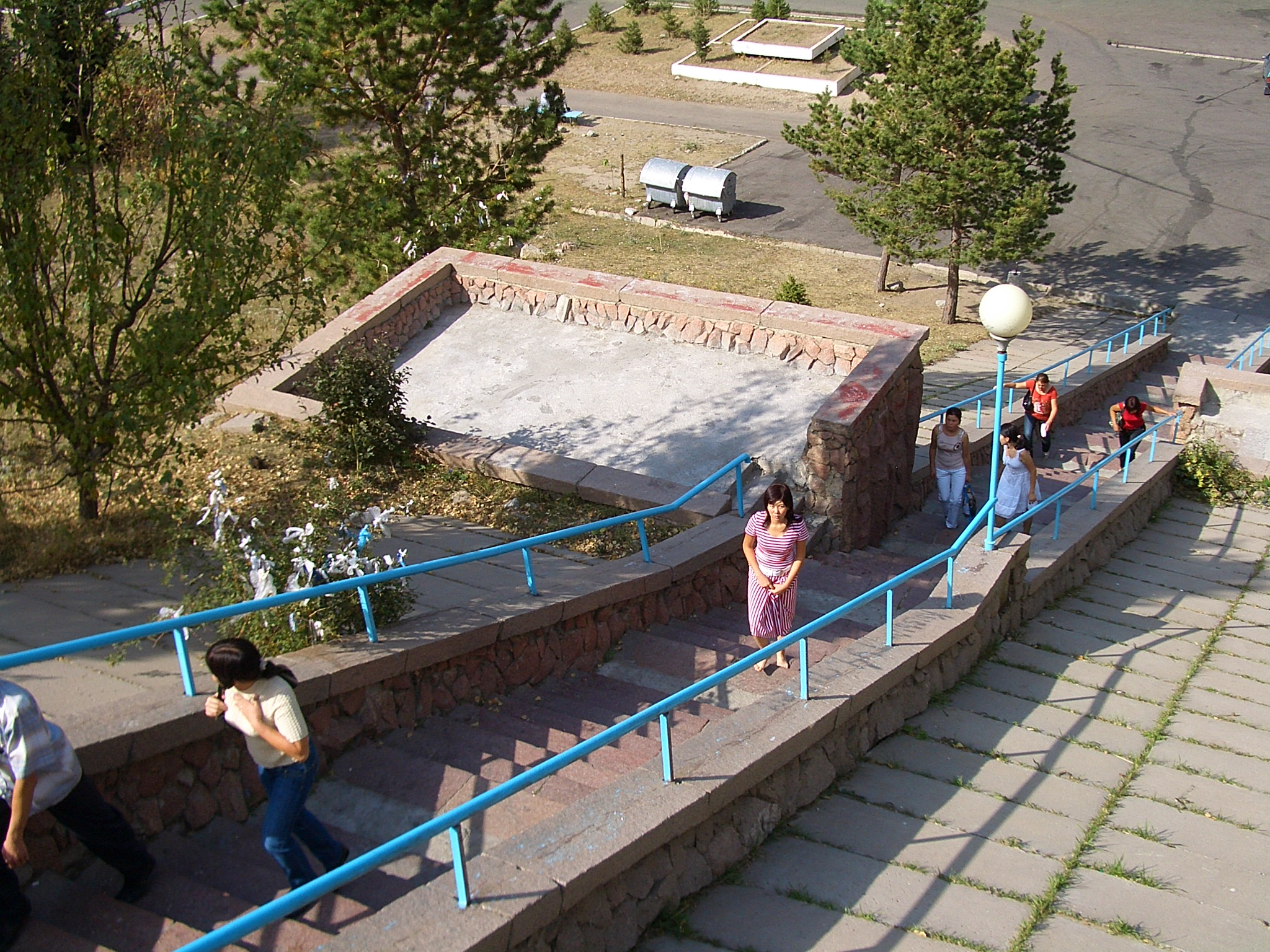
Sightseers climb Medeu Dam to get a good view of the Medeu Skating Rink

The Medeu Dam blocks the Medeu Valley (the valley of the Malaya Almatinka River) just south (upstream) of the Medeu Skating Rink. It was created on October 21, 1966 by a series of four preliminary explosions of 1,800 tons total and a final explosion of 3600 tons of ammonium nitrate-based explosive. On April 14, 1967 the dam was reinforced by an explosion of 3900 tons of ammonium nitrate-based explosive. More filling was done later on, until the dam reached its design profile in 1972.

Mikhail Lavrentyev, the Siberian mathematician known for his work on the theory of "directed explosion", was among the scientific consultants of this construction-by-explosion project.

It turned out that the dam was completed just in time for the potentially catastrophic mudflow of July 15, 1973. The dam worked, successfully stopping the flow. 3.8 million cubic meters of sediment was captured in the reservoir above the dam, bringing its bottom to the elevation of 1835 meters above the sea level.

There is an unfinished dam further up in the valley at 43.084436°N 77.078104°E. This dam was proved unnecessary due to the success of the Medeu dam and was abandoned due to cost constraints. It is currently the site of a meteorological station.
