= Butakovsky gorge =

Coordinates: 43.190°N 76.999°E

Butakovsky gorge is located on the Northern slope of the Zailiysky Alatau ridge in the watershed of The Little (Malaya) Almatinka basin and the Left Talgar, Kazakhstan.

== History ==
The local terrain was formed during the formation of the Tien Shan about 20 million years ago. In the 19th century, it was the dacha of the first Governor of Semirechye G. A. Kolpakovsky. There is an assumption that the gorge was named after the chief of the Cossack guard posted in this gorge in the 1860s to protect the forest from logging by migrants from Siberia. The Kazakh origin of the place name is not excluded: butak (i.e. a tributary). Indeed, the Butakovka river is a right tributary of the little (Malaya) Almatinka. From here you can walk to the Kimasar range and return to Медеу, as well as to the valley of the Left Talgar river.

== Tourism ==
The main attraction of the Butakovsky gorge is waterfalls. There are two of them: the lower one, 15 meters high, is the most popular among tourists. The second is smaller than the lower waterfall and is located in the upper part of the gorge at a distance of two kilometers. The vegetation of the gorge is diverse, with Tien Shan spruce, aspen, mountain ash and barberry growing on its slopes. In winter, the gorge is decorated with red clusters of mountain ash, which grows in abundance along the riverbed and on the nearby slopes. The gorge is located in the Medeu branch of the Ile - Alatau state unitary enterprise. In 1996, Butakovka became the legal property of the Ile-Alatau state nature Park. The territory of the gorge covers about 5000 hectares and is guarded by five inspectors. It has a favorable acoustic environment (silence, melodic sounds in nature). Recommended visiting periods: May–October. Inspection of the gorge is spectacular in the daytime.

== Sources ==
- Maryashev Monuments of Semirechye archeology and their use in excursions-Almaty, 2002
- A. P. Gorbunov Mountains Of Central Asia. Explanatory dictionary of geographical names and terms. Almaty, 2006
