= Tanbaly =

Petroglyphs within the Archaeological Landscape of Tamgaly
UNESCO World Heritage Site
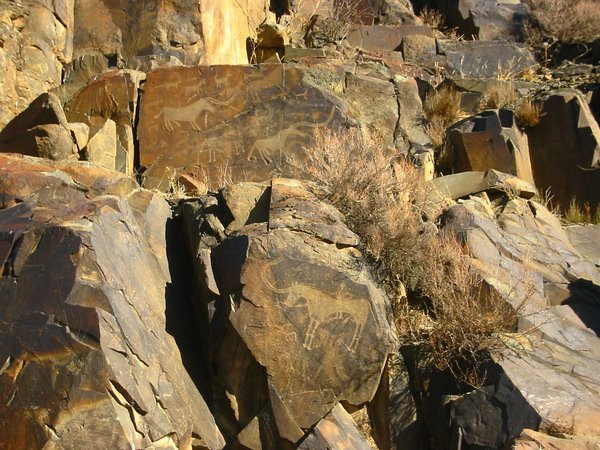
- Petroglyphs of Tamgaly

- Location within Kazakhstan Location within West and Central Asia
- Location: Kazakhstan
- Criteria: Cultural: (iii)
- Reference: 1145
- Inscription: 2004 (28th Session)
- Area: 900 ha (2,200 acres)
- Buffer zone: 2,900 ha (7,200 acres)
- Coordinates: 43°48′12″N 75°32′6″E

Tamgaly (Kazakh: Таңбалы, romanized: Tañbalı) is a petroglyph site in the Zhetysu of Kazakhstan. Tamgaly became a UNESCO World Heritage Site in 2004. Tamgaly is located 170 km (by road) northwest of Almaty.

The earliest of the petroglyphs of Tamgaly date from the Bronze Age (about 3,000 years ago), when the area was populated by the precursors to the Saka/Scythian people, and the most recent from the 18th or 19th century.

== Description ==
There are approximately 5,000 petroglyphs at Tamgaly distributed among 48 sites. Five of the most important sites, designated I, II, III, IV, and V, contain approximately 3,000 of the glyphs. These five sites are concentrated in the small Tamgaly canyon. Another 22 sites of secondary importance contain from 50 to 100 representations each. The remaining sites contain from 1 to 50 figures each and are widely distributed in area.

The Tamgaly petroglyphs represent work of four different epochs.

Middle Bronze Age glyphs have the greatest aesthetic and cultural value. Image sizes average around 25 to 30 cm with exceptional images reaching 0.7 to 1.0 meters in size. They were developed primarily by picking with an engraving depth of 3 to 5 mm. They tend to have a naturalistic allure with the range of images including anthropomorphic, zoomorphic, and syncretic subjects. Examples include solar deities (sun-heads), disguised personages, men with clubs, archers with wolf masks, worshippers, armed warriors, animal and human sacrifices, erotic scenes, birthing women, chariots, bulls, asses, horses, camels, boars, wolves, deer, etc. Some of the animalistic images represent species that are extinct today.

Late Bronze Age and transitional period glyphs have less variety and are less technically rendered. They are picked to a depth of one to two millimeters. Average size is less than 15 cm. Complex subjects are rare. Horses, bulls, and wild animals remain but with more scenes of pastoral life added.

Early Iron Age glyphs are the most quantitatively numerous at Tamgaly. These examples are not as homogenous in style, quality, or subject as those from the earlier periods. They were created by a wider variety of peoples and tribes. The hunt of wild animals and chase of deer and goats by predators are still common.

Middle Ages and modern time petroglyphs are fewer in number with only about 300 images. Scenes include dueling warriors. Hunting scenes tend to have more emphasis on the hunter rather than the prey. More emphasis is placed on banners, weapons, and horse equipment. Figures are more superficially engraved and many are made as additions to earlier glyphs. Locations of the engravings are less prominent.

The name Tamgaly in Kazakh and other Turkic languages means "painted or marked place".

== See also ==
- List of World Heritage Sites in Kazakhstan

== Gallery ==
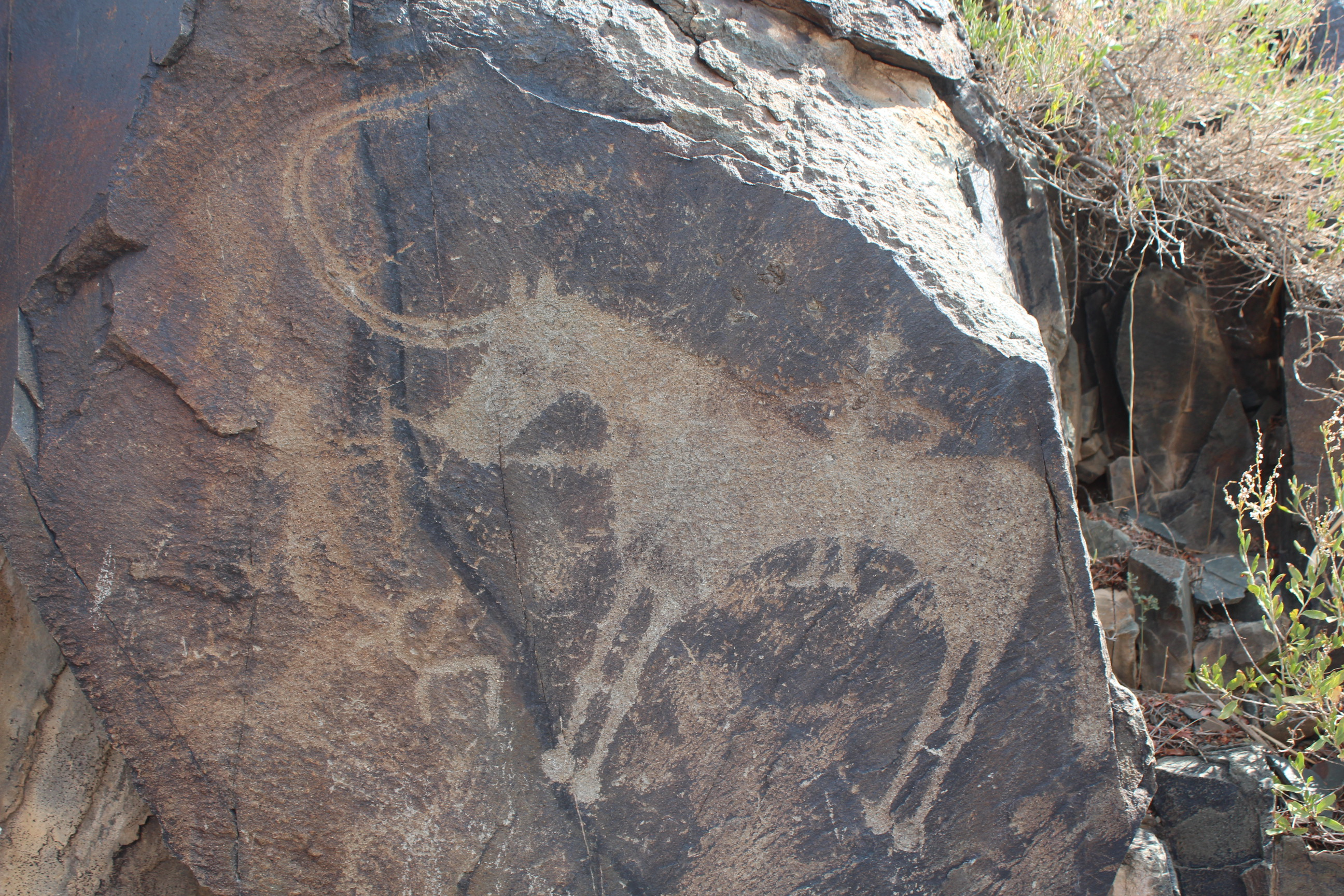
Ancient stone carvings (petroglyphs) found in a small ravine at Tamgaly

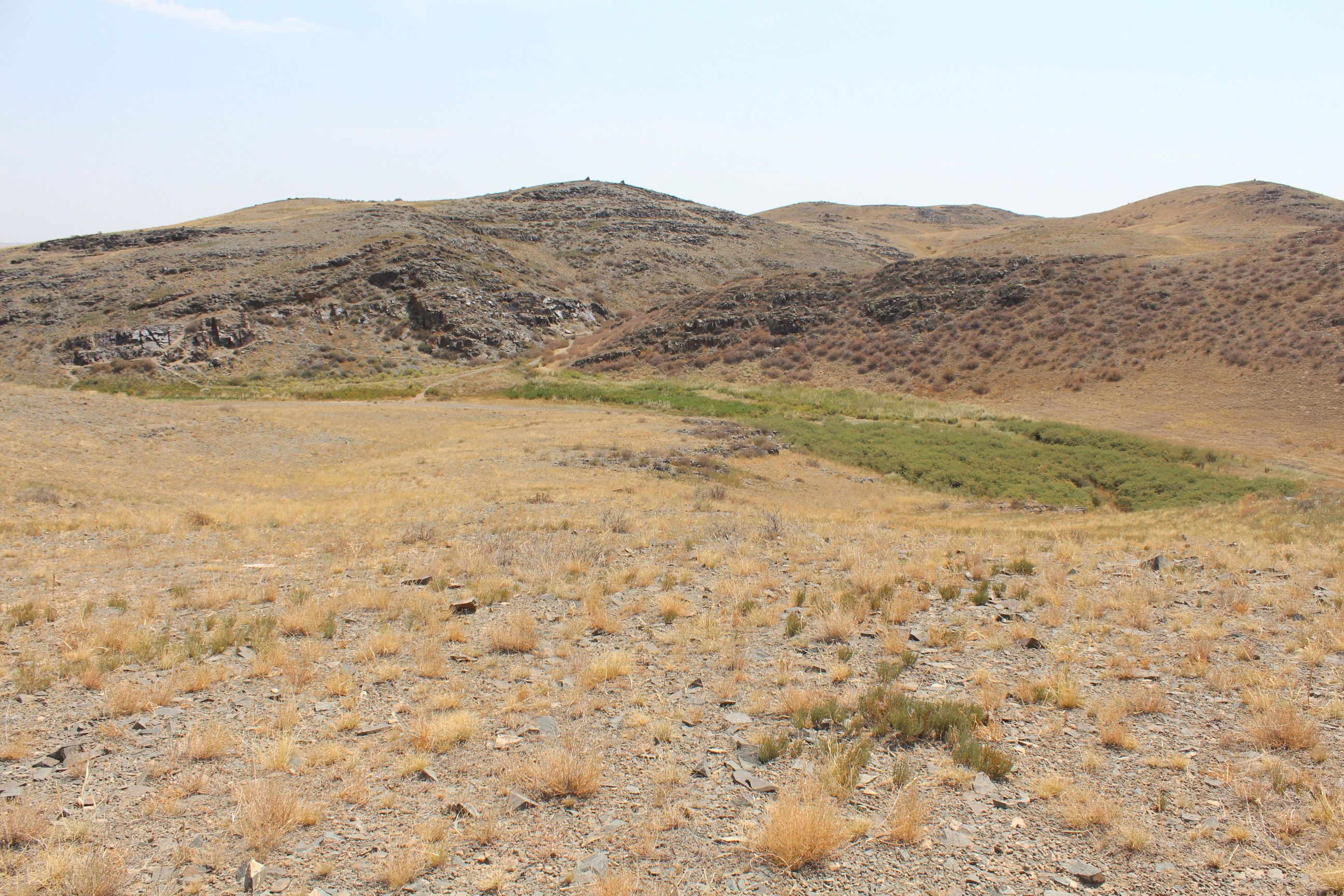
Looking across the small ravine that contains the petroglyphs

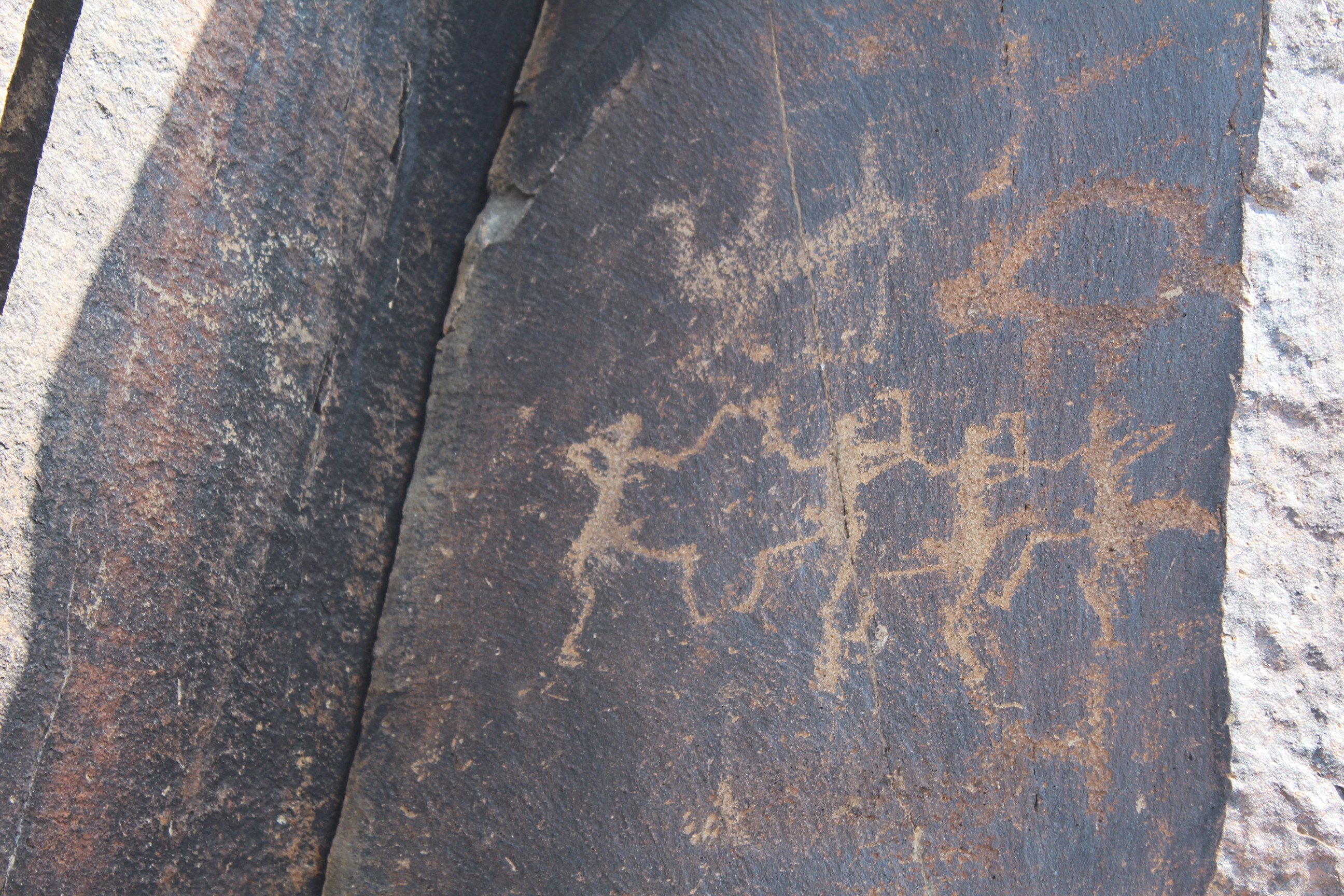
Petroglyphs of ancient tribal dance and animals

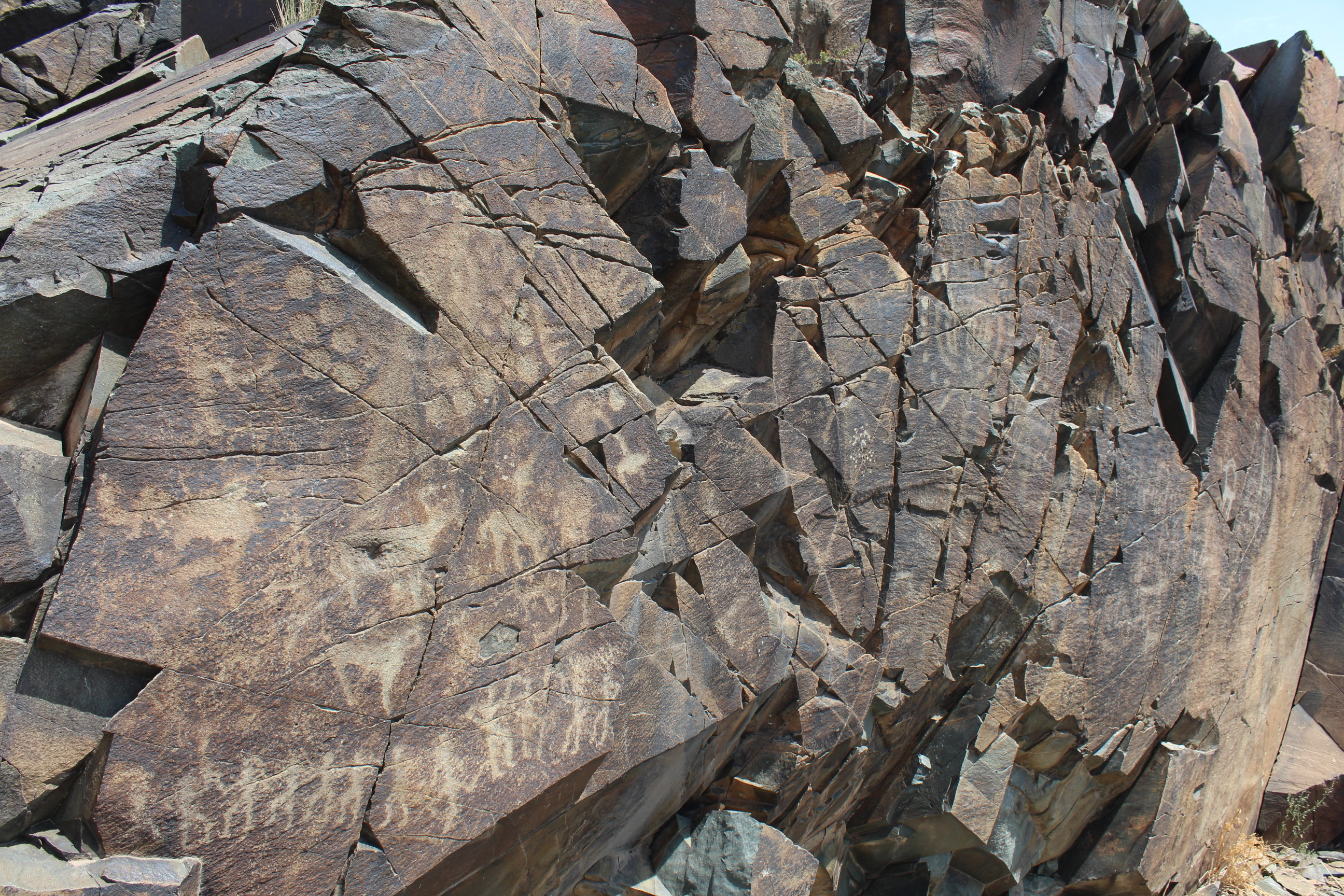
The largest group of petroglyphs in a sacred site

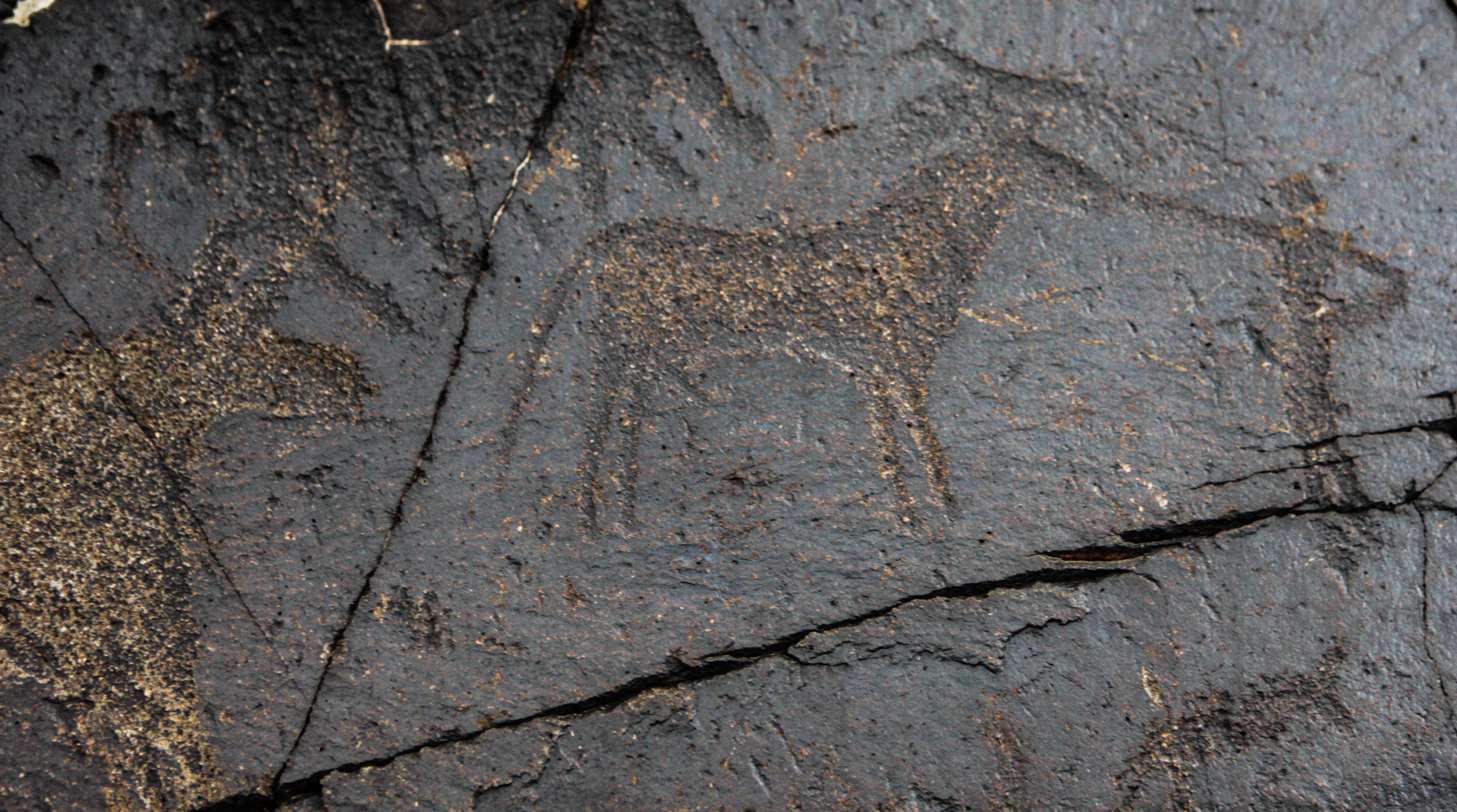
Petroglyphs in Tamgaly, Unesco World Heritage Site, Kazakhstan

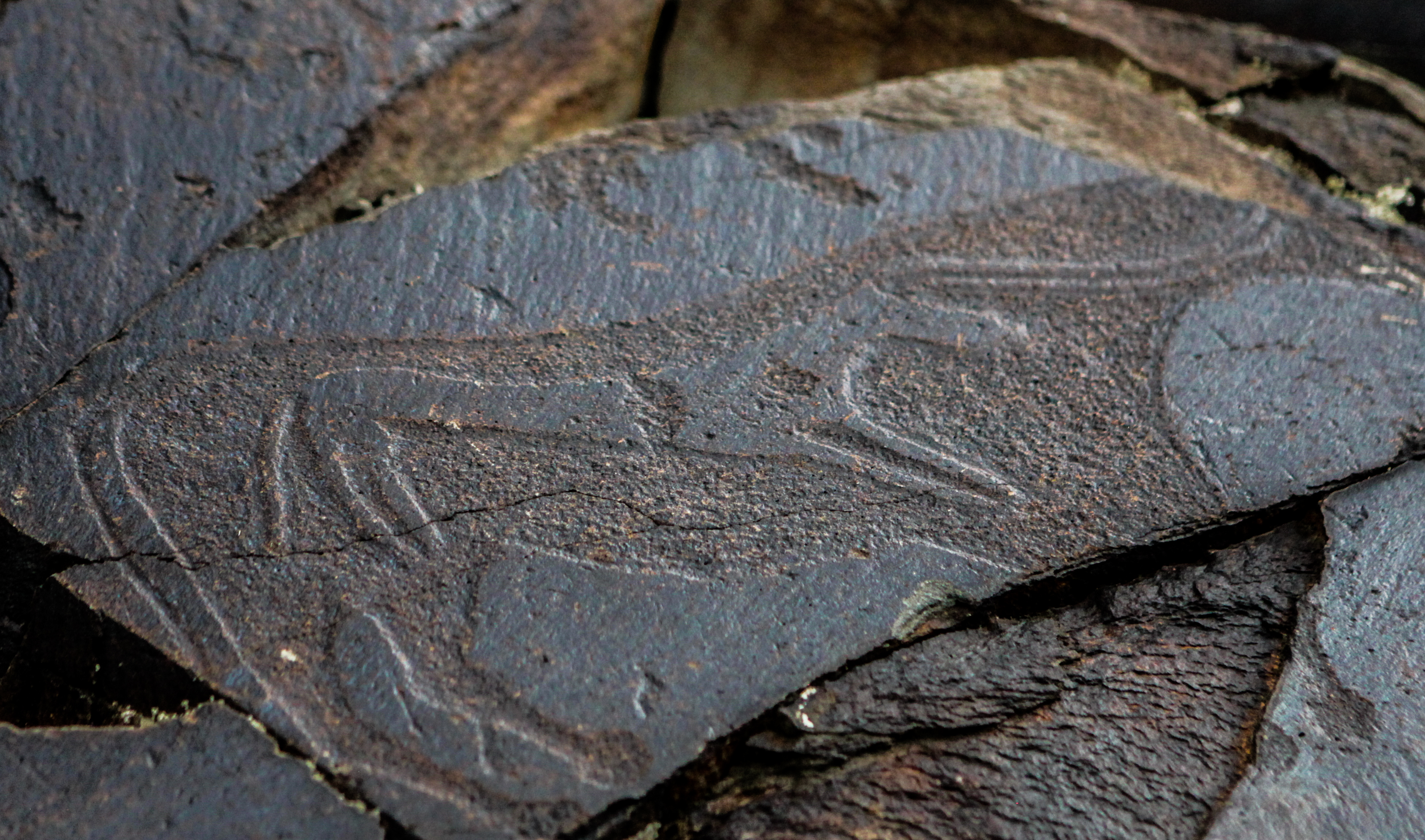
Petroglyphs in Tamgaly, Unesco World Heritage Site, Kazakhstan

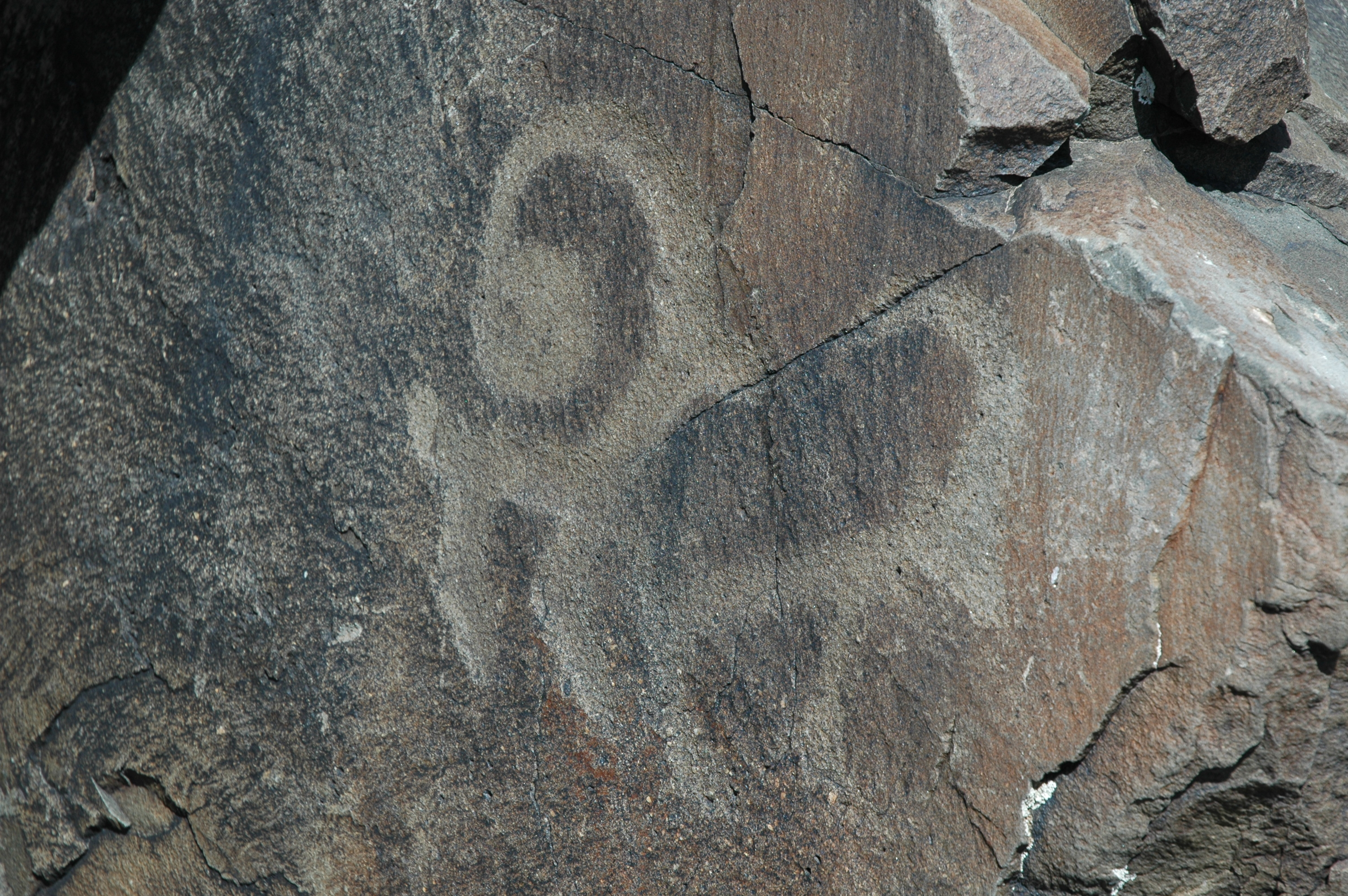
Petroglyphs in Tamgaly

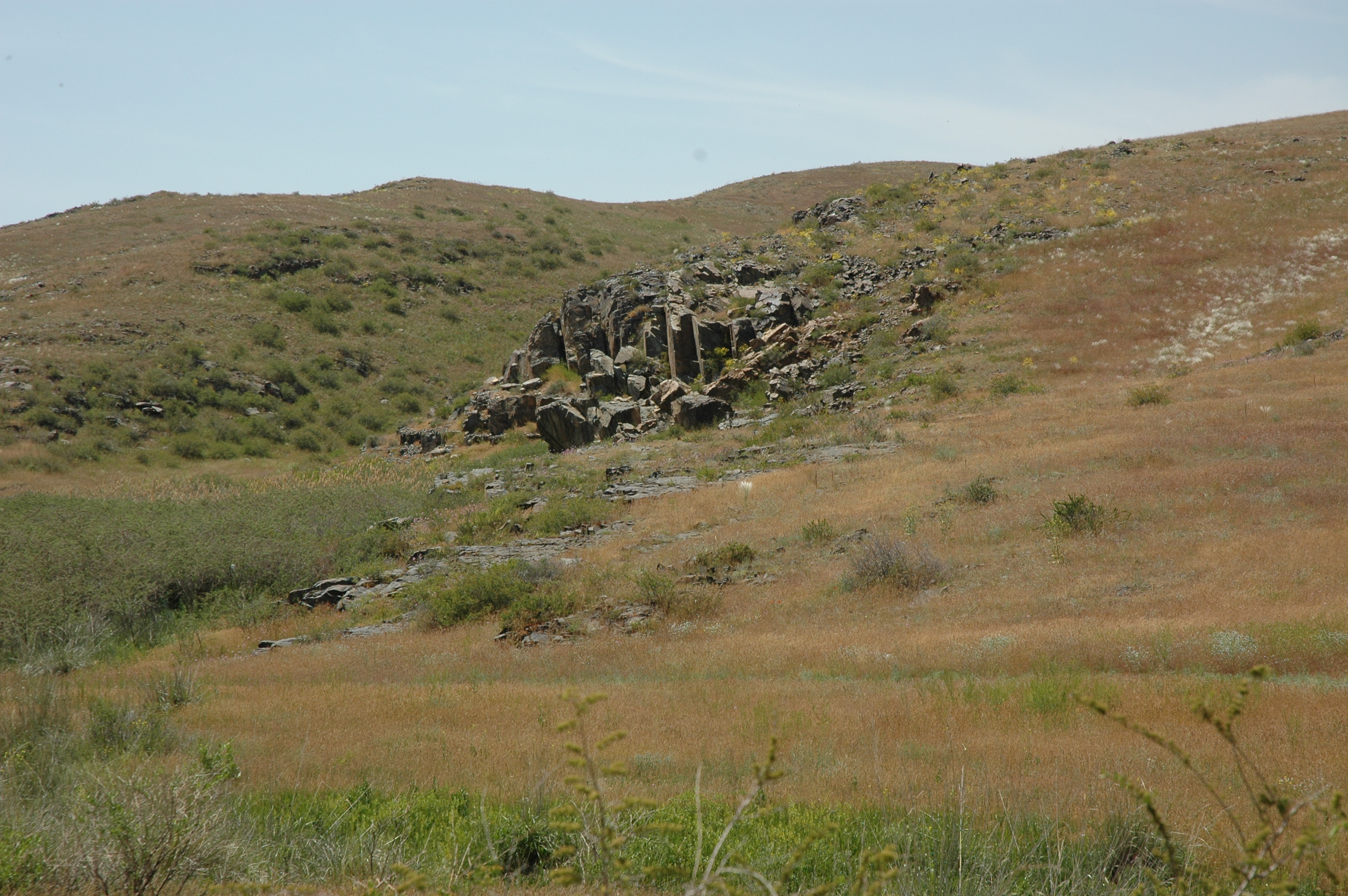
view of landscape Tamgaly
