= Small Almaty (river) =

River in Kazakhstan

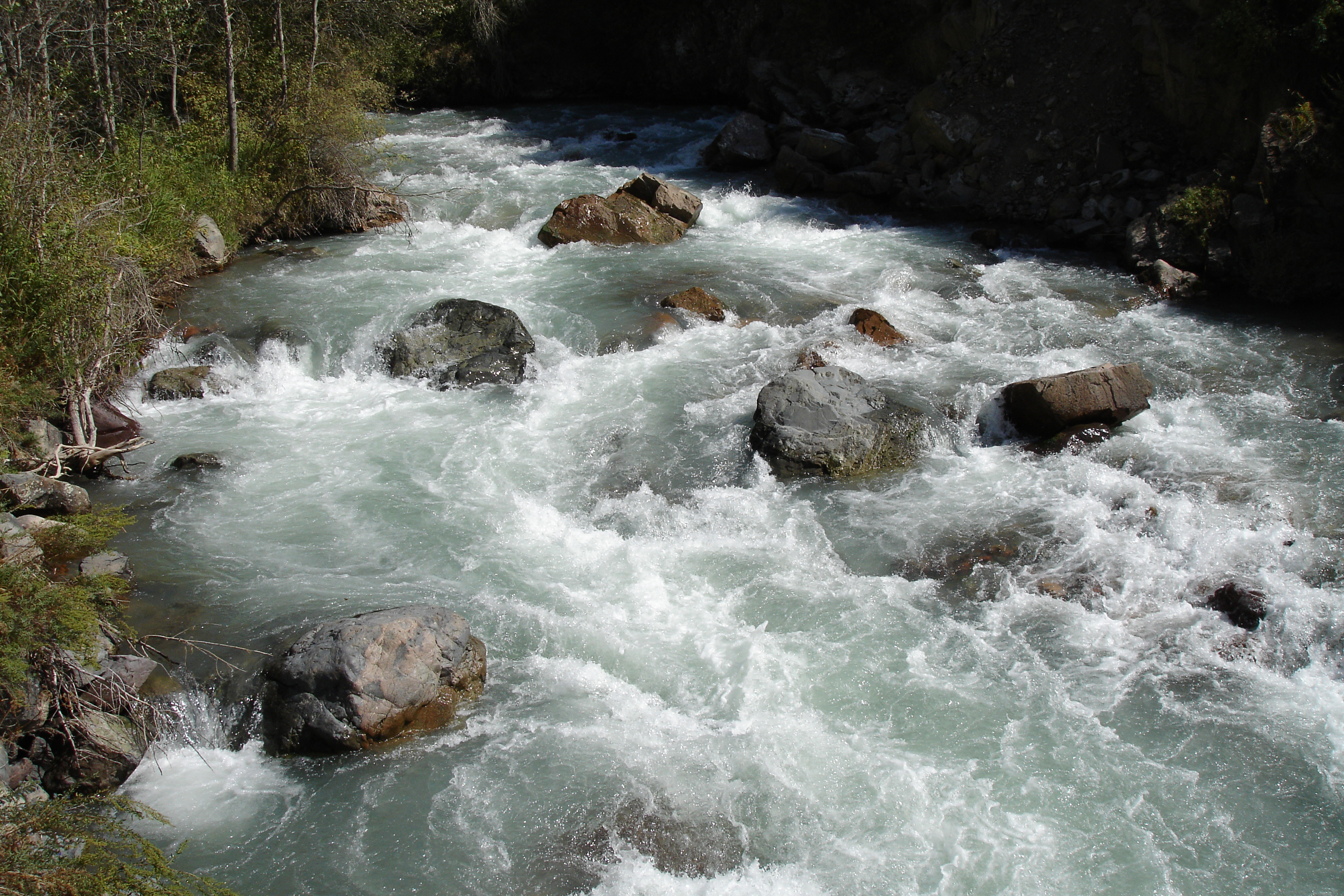

Location
- Country: Kazakhstan
- Region: Almaty

Physical characteristics
- Source: Tuyuksu Glacier
- Mouth
  - location: Kaskelen
  - coordinates: 43°46′12″N 77°06′58″E
  - elevation: 475,6 m
- Length: 125 km (78 mi)
- Basin size: 710 km²

Basin features
- Cities: Almaty

Small Almaty (Kazakh: Кіші Алматы, romanized: Kışı Almaty; Russian: Малая Алматинка, romanized: Malaya Almatinka) is a river located in Almaty, the right tributary of the Qaskelen River. It originates from the Tuyuksu glacier of the Trans-Ili Alatau Range. The river length is 125 km, and its watershed area 710 km^{2}. The main tributaries are Sarysay, Kuigensay, Kimasar, Jarbulaq, Batareika, Butakovka, Qarasu-Turksib, Esentai, Qarasu, and Terenqara.

== History ==
In 1854, by a group of Major Peremyshelsky, left bank of the Small Almaty was selected as the most suitable place for the construction of Zailiyskiy fortification. Later Cossack families settled here and formed Bolshaya Stanitsa and Malaya Stanitsa. From that moment the history of the town of Verny began. The Small Almaty River served as the main source of drinking water for the first settlers.

== Physical and geographical features ==
The Small Almaty is located in three different landscape zones: mountain, foothill and plain. The river channel in the mountain zone is moderately winding, composed of boulder and pebble deposits, width 3–13 m; the river depth is from 0.15 to 0.5 m; average annual flow of the river 0.32 m^{3}/s, at the meteorological station Mynzhilky, 2.3 m^{3}/s.

Small Almaty and its tributaries are mudflow-prone. The most catastrophic mudflows were observed in 1921, 1956, and 1973. In October 1966, a mudflow control dam was built in the Medeu tract by means of directed explosion in the river basin.

At the outflow of the Small Almaty Gorge, the river divides into three branches: the Esentai (Vesnovka), the Jarbulaq (Kazachka) and the Small Almaty itself. Within Almaty city limits, the Small Almaty flows along the eastern part of the city, its banks are concreted. There are 46 lakes, ponds and reservoirs with a total area of 2.5 km^{2} in the river basin.

== Improvements and flood protection ==
=== Water cascades ===
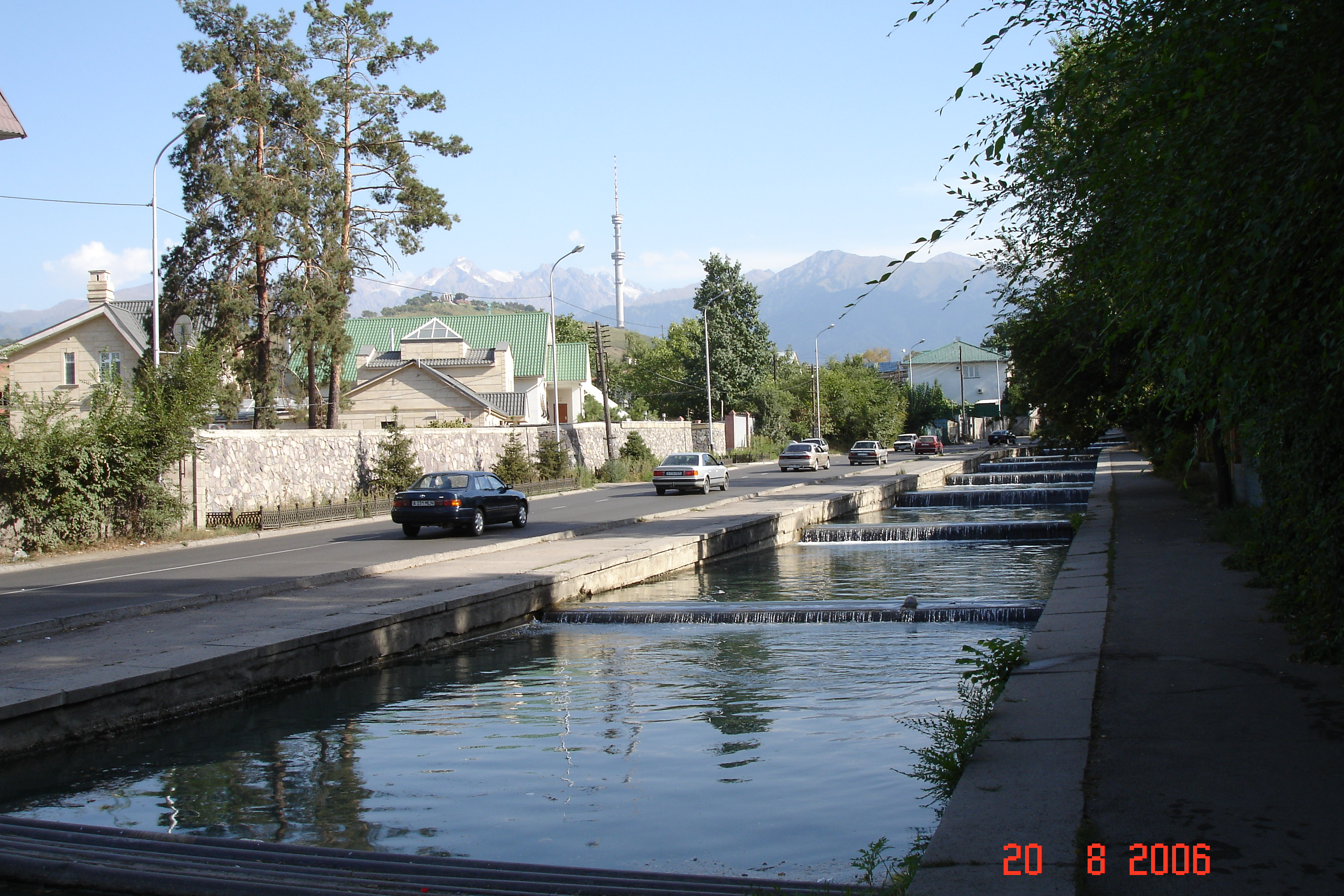
Water cascades of Malaya Almatinka river

In 1971, according to the project of Soviet engineers, a water cascade was created along the channel of the Malaya Almatinka River, consisting of 28 reinforced concrete water basins of 8x12 size, with a total length of 600 meters. The riverbed was reinforced and concreted, along the whole channel at a certain distance special walls-weirs were installed, which are important dampers of the velocity of water flow, protecting the city from flooding and floodwaters. The task and purpose of water cascade basins of the river is not only to protect the city from floods, but also to improve the microclimate by cooling the city's air in the summer heat.

=== Landscaping ===
In 1971, a protective green zone was established along the river embankment under the project "Green Belt of Alma-Ata" on both sides of the channel, where protective green plantings (elms) were planted. At present, the green zone is partially preserved and partially cut down due to the illegal sale of lands of the water protection zone for the construction of residential complexes and cafes.

=== Terrenkur ===
Along the river, above Satpayev Street, the Terrenkur promenade takes off.

== Reconstruction ==
In 2012, a major reconstruction of the channel and embankment of the Malaya Almatinka River from the Palace of the Republic to Makataeva Street was completed by order of the Akimat of Alma-Ata city. As a result of the reconstruction the reinforced concrete walls of the riverbed itself and the cascades were completely renewed. The asphalt coating of the existing sidewalks was renewed, and new lighting poles and cantilevered sodium lamps were installed.

In 2017, at the request of the Medeu District Akimat, there was a reconstruction of the reinforced concrete river channel KL, laid along the bed on the south side under the promenade sidewalk on the section from Bogenbai Batyr Street to Makataeva Street.

In 2017, the "Department of Urbanism" of the Akimat of Almaty proposed a radical transformation of the embankment of the Malaya Almatinka River and its riverbed into a public space, and ordered the development of the project. In 2020, the Department of Comfortable Environment received a finished project and called a tender for the transformation of the embankment and the Malaya Almatinka Riverbed. Having got acquainted with the project, the city residents, the environmental and town protection organizations were indignant with the planned works. By the project of transformation the officials intended to carry out large-scale cutting of a green zone of a water-protective zone of the river. Numerous trees and grass natural covers were to be demolished for the construction of numerous new paths, fountains and platforms. The conversion project also intended to remove all of the river's water cascades-basins. In order to prevent the felling of trees and the dismantling of the cascades of the Malaya Almatinka River, environmental and urban conservation organizations wrote an open appeal to the President of Kazakhstan, Tokayev K.K., with a request to ban the destruction of trees and cascades. After that, on behalf of the head of state, the "Department of Urbanism" made a statement that the water cascades will be preserved, and the trees of the green zone will not be cut down. However, despite the assurances of the akimat, in October 2020, the contractor demolished several reinforced concrete cascades on the Malaya Almatinka River, broke the reinforced concrete bed in the channel, and dug a two-meter ditch. These works caused a violent outcry from residents and environmental organizations in the city.

== Pollution ==
In the "Mayak" neighborhood, on the lower outskirts of the city, polluted water is illegally discharged into the Malaya Almatinka River from a cattle ranch. Environmentalists call this situation an environmental disaster.

== River arms ==
- Esentai is the left branch. The length is 43 km. Within Almaty city limits, the river banks are concreted. The average annual water flow is 0.06 m^{3}/s. Flooding is in May–June. The water is supplied by snow and rain.
- Jarbulaq (Kazachka). Length 4.5 km, catchment area 5.92 km^{2}, feeding by snow and partly by soil. The average width of the channel is 1.8 m, the average depth is 0.10-0.15 m. The flow is observed all year round. The average long-term water flow is 0.083 m^{3}/s, the highest - 1.16 m^{3}/s

== Main inflows ==
The main tributaries of the Malaya Almatinka River are:

- Kuigensai (Gorelnik) originates from the northern slope of the Zailiisky Alatau ridge at an altitude of 3 thousand meters. Its length is 5.8 km, the catchment area is 12 km^{2}, and it has two tributaries with a total length of 4 km. There are three moraine lakes in the upper reaches of the river. The width of the channel is 1.8–2 m, the depth is 0.15-0.2 m. The average long-term water flow is 0.24 m^{3}/s, the runoff is year-round. The river is mudflow-prone. The largest mud flows were observed on May 10, 1944 (mud flow of 9.9 m^{3}/sec) and on May 22, 1951 (mud flow of 20 m^{3}/sec). There is a waterfall of about 10 m high, 5 km above the mouth.
- Qotyrbulaq originates on the northern slope of the Kotyrbulak mountain and flows into the Malaya Almatinka river. It is 32 km long. The catchment area is 81.5 km^{2}. The highest average annual flow rate is up to 0.5 m^{3}/sec.
- Qarasu is the right tributary. It originates from the springs of the northern slope of the Zailiisky Alatau Range. It is 17 km long and has 11 small tributaries. The flow is observed all year round. The average long-term water flow rate is about 10 L/sec. The highest flow rate is 30-40 L/sec during snowmelt.
