= Issyk =

Issyk may refer to

- Esik/Issyk town
- Issyk (river), Kazakhstan
- Lake Issyk, Kazakhstan
- Issyk-Kul (Issyk Lake, Warm Lake), Kyrgyzstan
