= Kaynazar =

Kaynazar Қайназар
- Village
- Location in Kazakhstan
- Coordinates: 43°21′59″N 77°18′39″E
- Country: Kazakhstan
- Region: Almaty Region
- District: Enbekshikazakh District

Population (2009)
  - Total: 4,058
- Time zone: UTC+6 (Omsk Time)

Kaynazar (Kazakh: Қайназар, Qainazar) is a village in Almaty Region, in south-eastern Kazakhstan.

== Notable people ==
- Quddus Khojamyarov (1918–1994), composer
