= Qiakemake River =

Coordinates: 40.0983°N 75.3994°E

- Native name: 恰克玛克河 (Chinese); 恰克马克河 (Chinese)

Location
- Country: People's Republic of China

Physical characteristics
- Length: 166 kilometers

The Qiakemake River or Qakmak He (Chinese: 恰克玛克河; 恰克马克河), also known as Chaqmaq River, Chakmak River, is a tributary of the Kashgar River (喀什噶尔河) in the southwestern Xinjiang Uygur Autonomous Region of the People's Republic of China, located in the northern part of the southern foothills of the Tianshan Mountains and the western edge of the Tarim Basin.

Qiakemake River originates from the Suyok River (苏约克河) in the Aktau Mountains (阿克套山) in the territory of Wuqia County, turns southeast and descends to the middle section where it merges with the Tuyugaardt River (图尤噶尔特河) to become the Chakmak River. The river has a total length of 166 kilometers, a watershed area of about 4,820 square kilometers, and a catchment area of about 3,788 square kilometers.
