= Issyk Golden Cataphract Warrior =

Suit of armor found in Kazakhstan

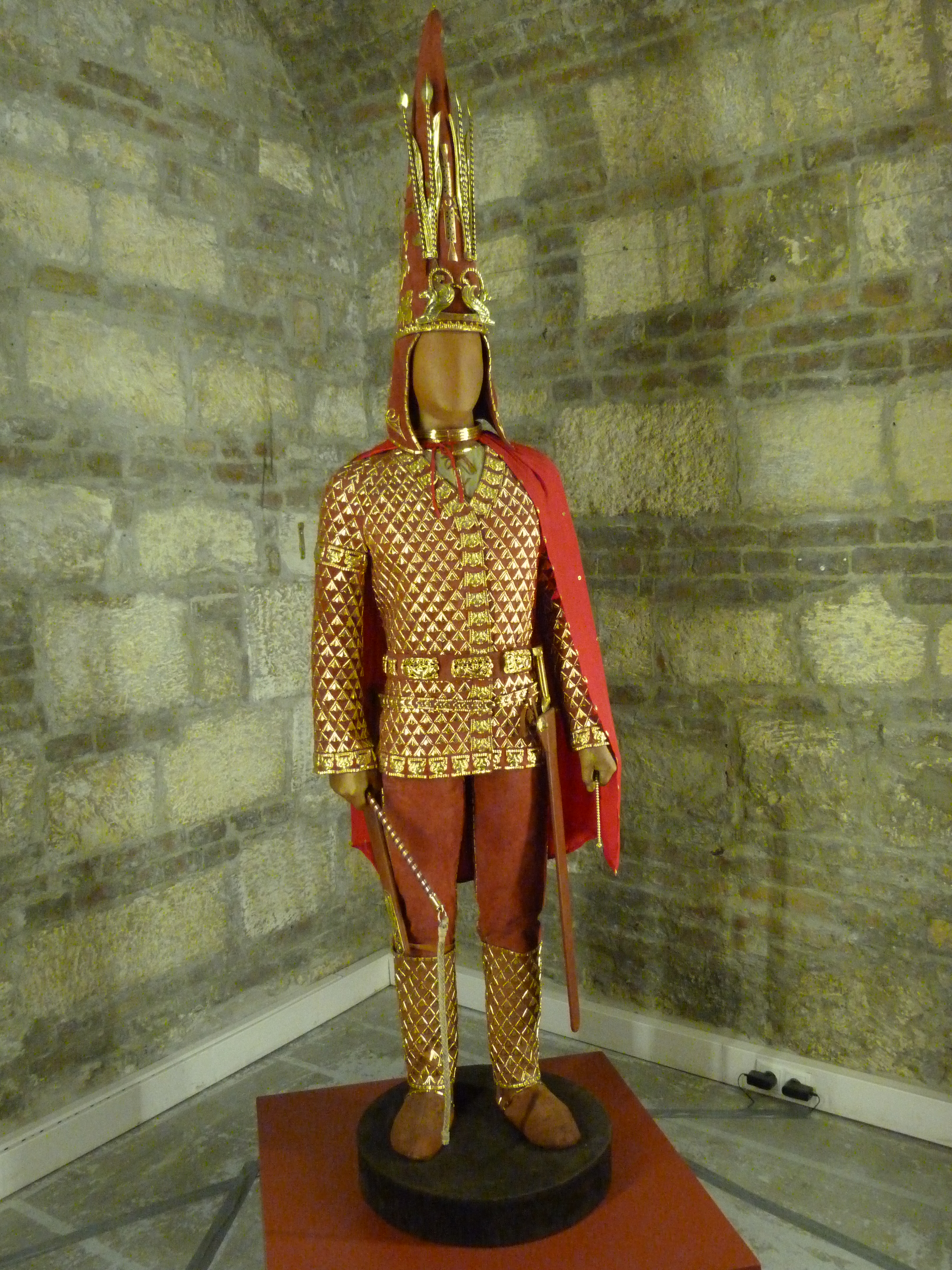
Cataphract made of gold found in the Issyk kurgan.

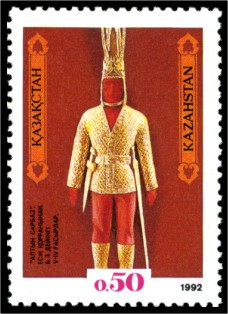
The stamp of Issyk Golden Cataphract Warrior in Kazakhstan.

The Issyk Golden Cataphract Warrior, is a suit of armor consisting of thousands of gold pieces found by chance in 1969 during the construction of a garage and road improvement works at the Issyk burial mound in the south of the country of Almaty. It was recovered from the Issyk kurgan, which was examined by a team of archaeologists from the Kazakhstan Institute of History, Ethnography and Archaeology headed by Kimal Akishev.

It is thought to have belonged to the Scythians or Sakas. The Golden Cataphract Warrior is thought to be a Saka prince or princess around the age of 18, since he dates to the 4th century BC and the region where the kurgan was found was ruled by the Sakas in the 4th century BC. The armor was exhibited in Ankara for 2 weeks in 2019 and then moved back to Kazakhstan. Today, it is exhibited in the National Museum of the Republic of Kazakhstan.
