= Akshiy =

Akshiy Ақши
- Village
- Location in Kazakhstan Akshiy (Asia)
- Coordinates: 43°30′54″N 77°37′57″E
- Country: Kazakhstan
- Region: Almaty Region
- District: Enbekshikazakh District

Population (2009)
  - Total: 4,923
- Time zone: UTC+6 (Omsk Time)
- Postal code: 040411
- Area code: 72775

Akshiy (Kazakh: Ақши, Aqşi) is a village in the Almaty Region of south-eastern Kazakhstan. Akshiy is located along the A351 highway, to the east of Baltabay.
