= Bughyty =

Mountain range in Almaty Region, Kazakhstan

- Бұғыты (Kazakh); Бугутты (Russian)
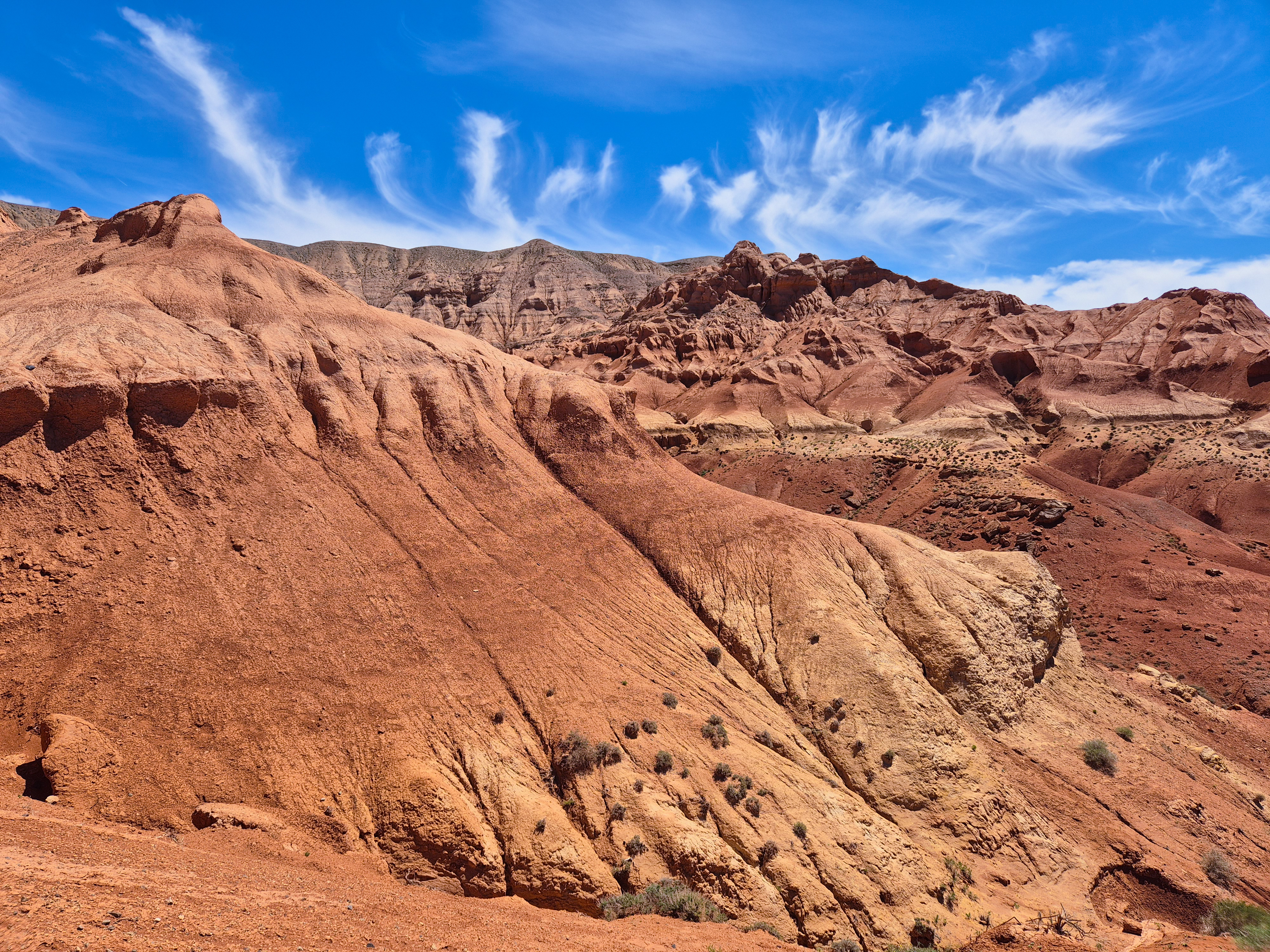

Highest point
- Coordinates: 43°34′N 78°49′E

Geography
- Location within Kazakhstan
- Location: Enbekshikazakh District, Almaty Region, Kazakhstan

The Bughyty (Kazakh: Бұғыты, romanized: Buğıtı; Russian: Бугутты, romanized: Bugutty) is a mountain range within the Trans-Ili Alatau branch of the northern Tengri Tagh (Tian Shan) in Kazakhstan. Administratively, it is part of the Enbekshikazakh District of Almaty Region.
