= Wooden Lake =

Lake in Kazakhstan

Coordinates: 43.845°N 79.420°E

Derevyannoe, or "Wooden Lake", is a reservoir in the Almaty Region of Kazakhstan. It is in the Uygur District at an altitude of 520m and is the source of the river Karaeren. The lake sits to the West of the Sharyn River, near its mouth, and is surrounded by salt marshes, swamps and Turanga groves to its South and East. The sandy shores of the lake are surrounded by beaches & reeds, creating a beautiful and unusual contrast. The local population believes the mud of the lake to have healing properties for illness and disease.

== History ==
The reservoir is said to have been formed around the turn of the twentieth century or in the preceding one. It gets its name from the trees growing within the lake.

== Description ==
The Aktau Mountains (White Mountains) lie on the opposite bank of the Ili River, north of the lake, in the territory of the state National Natural Park "Altyn-Emel". They are visible from the tops of lake's sand dunes. The Karabaskum Desert borders the lake to the west and north, where its sands are advancing. Tugai and Turanga thickets border it to the east and south. The lake supports plants and animal life and is visited by tourists.

== Wildlife ==
The lake's rich marine life includes carp, white cupid, and catfish, similar to the Sharyn and Ili rivers. It is commonly believed that up to the 1930s, the reeds and polar on the banks of the Wooden Lake were home to the Turanian Tiger, now long extinct. Today, among the diverse mammalian wildlife of the region are found boars, foxes, hares, and occasionally, wolves. The region is also home to a wide variety of birds, such as ducks, geese, herons and cranes.

== Climate ==
The climate of Wooden Lake is continental.

Winter sees a stable snow cover and an average temperature of around −4 °C in January. There are often frosts up to −40 °C.

The average temperature in July is 28 °C, occasionally rising to 45 °C. Precipitation falls up to 300mm per year, mainly in spring and autumn. Travelers traveling by car are advised not to visit the lake during a downpour as the roads in the salt marshes becomes impassable. Fishing and hunting are year-round activities in the area.

It is believed that the life of the Wooden Lake will be short-lived, and that the reason for its disappearance will be sand. The way the belief goes, the destruction and recreation of the lake is an endless cycle: the desert encroaches on the lake, gradually absorbing it, eventually, the lake disappears, leaving behind numerous dried-up trunks of sand-choked trees on the shore. Several more years later, the lake is reborn, and again fights the advancing desert.

== Legend ==
A fable explaining the creation of Lake Derevyannoe brings Sharyn, Ili and the Karabasan desert to life as characters in an imaginative account of geological change.

"Stormy Sharyn was in a hurry to bring his water to Ili. Nothing could prevent its rapid flow. Along the way, Sharyn cut deep canyons, and, washing away the clay banks, made a muddy stream rush to the intended goal. Nothing seemed to stop him. Then came the powerful desert Karabasan, standing up to Sharyn. The desert began to advance on the wayward river and was able to cut off one of the branches from it, blocking its further path with sand dunes. The water spread, flooding the surrounding banks with Turanga groves, and formed a lake that people called Wooden. But Sharyn still brought its main waters to the Ili."

== Sources of information about the monument ==
- Marikovsky P. I. The Fate Of Charyn. Almaty: Foundation "XXI century", 1997.-120
- Luterovich O. G. Three popular excursions in Semirechye: a guide, Almaty: "Service Press", 2016.- 92c.
- Maryashev Monuments of Semirechye archeology and their use in excursions-Almaty, 2002
