= Alga, Almaty =

Alga Алға
- village
- Location in Kazakhstan
- Coordinates: 43°26′42″N 77°10′23″E
- Country: Kazakhstan
- Region: Almaty Region
- District: Enbekshikazakh District

Population (2009)
  - Total: 1,866
- Time zone: UTC+6 (Omsk Time)
- Postal code: 040412

Alga (Kazakh: Алға, Alğa) is a village in Almaty Region of south-eastern Kazakhstan.
