= Avat =

Avat Ават
- Village
- Location in Kazakhstan
- Coordinates: 43°24′0″N 77°16′03″E
- Country: Kazakhstan
- Region: Almaty Region
- District: Enbekshikazakh District

Population (2009)
  - Total: 5,670
- Time zone: UTC+6 (Omsk Time)
- Postal code: 040405
- Area code: 72775

Avat (Kazakh: Ават, Avat) is a village in Almaty Region of south-eastern Kazakhstan.
