= Oshaktas Monument =

Historical monument in Kazakhstan

Coordinates: 43°55′43.4″N 78°29′11.3″E

The Oshaktas Monument
- The Oshaktas Monument
- Location: Republic of Kazakhstan, Almaty region, State National Natural Park "Altyn-Emel"
- Material: stone
- Height: 2m each

The Oshaktas Steles is a historical monument, which is located in the State National Natural Park "Altyn-Emel" in Almaty region Republic of Kazakhstan.

== Description ==
The Oshaktas stone steles located near the mountains of Kalkan in open foothill plains. The historical monument of Oshaktas is 3 blocks of stone about 2 meters high, which are installed vertically. There are 2 versions of the monument formation. According to the first legend, in 1219, the Mongol conqueror Genghis Khan, during his campaign to conquer Central Asia, set up a camp near the Mynbulak cordon. A giant cauldron was set up on the rocks where food was prepared. According to the second version, "Oshaktas" designed as a signal tower, where a fire lit in case of approaching enemies.
