= Baltabay =

- Location in Kazakhstan
- Coordinates: 43°30′18″N 77°32′26″E
- Country: Kazakhstan
- Region: Almaty Region
- Time zone: UTC+6 (Omsk Time)

Baltabay is a small town in Almaty Region of south-eastern Kazakhstan. Baltabay is located along the A351 highway, to the west of Akshiy. A small lake is located to the north-west of the town. To the east of the town are industrial buildings.
