= Besshatyr Burial Ground =

Burial mounds in Kazakhstan

- "Five Tents"
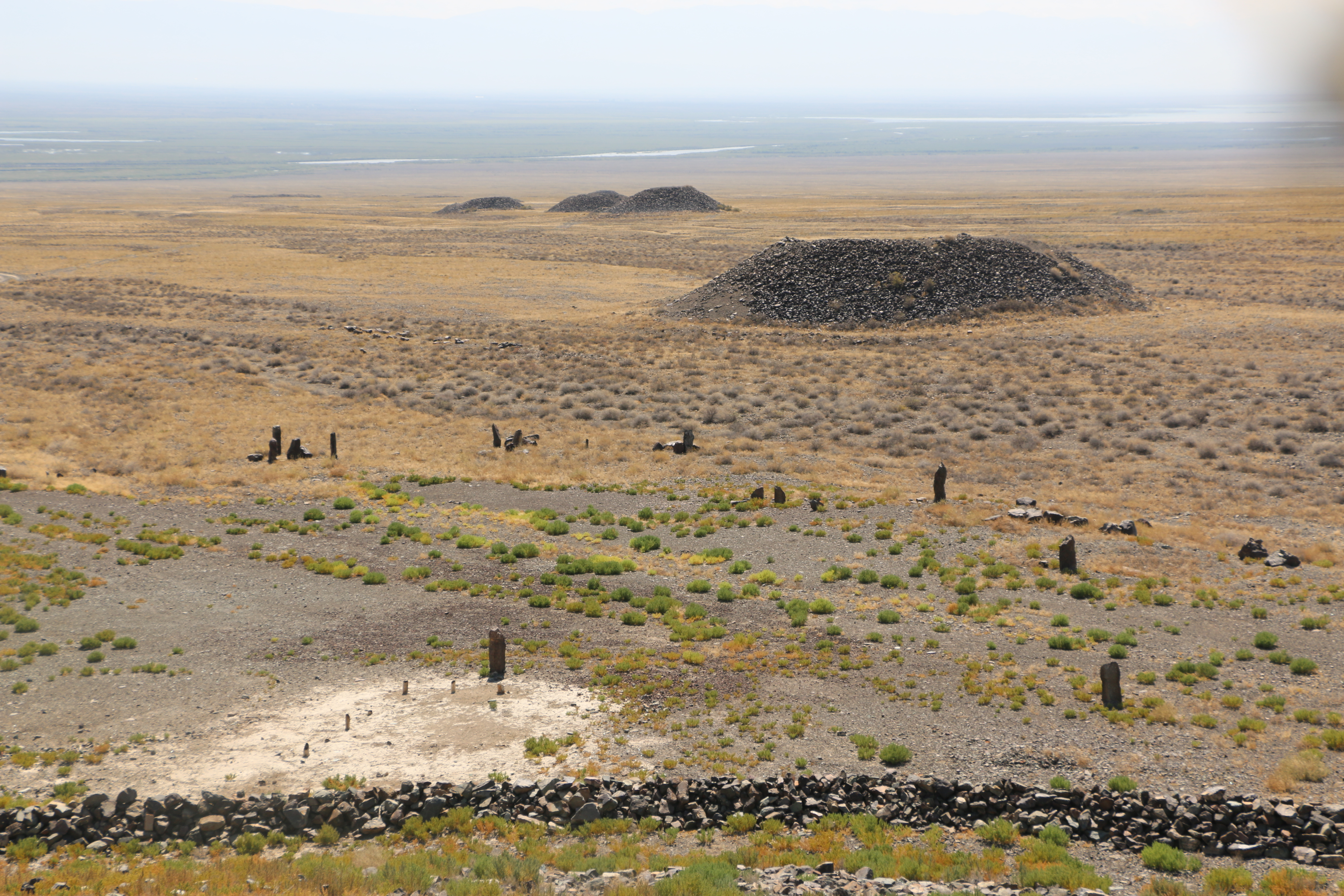
- Besshatyr Burial Ground

Geography
- Location: Ili River, Altyn-Emel National Park, Kazakhstan.

The Besshatyr Kurgan (the royal burial mounds of Besshatyr) in Kazakhstan is a complex of tombs of the Semirechye-Saka tribe era. From the Kazakh language, "Besshatyr" translates as "Five Tents" which is most likely derived from the number of the largest mounds in this area.

The mounds are located in the valley of the Ili River on the territory of the Altyn-Emel National Park in the Kerbulak district, Almaty region.

== Description ==
The Besshatyr mound consists of many burial grounds covering a total area of about 2 km^{2} (0.77 sq mi). These burial grounds date to the 6th to 4th centuries BC.

The big Besshtyrski mound is the largest of the mounds. The height of the mound is 17 meters (56 ft), the diameter - 105 meters (344 ft). The mound has the shape of a truncated body and a stone layer at the base. The mound is surrounded by 94 ring fences made of stone pillars-menhirs and large boulders in a spiral. Some of the menhirs have tamgas of Kazakh families painted on them. In one of the mounds was a wooden building made of massive trunks of Tien Shan firs.

== Archaeology ==
The first mention of the necropolis was by Vladimir Gorodetsky in 1924. About 33 years later the burial grounds were first investigated by an archaeological expedition led by K. Akishev from 1959 to 1961. Archaeologists have established that the mound includes thirty-one large and small burial grounds. Twenty-one burial grounds are covered with stone, ten with a layer of rubble and clay.

Conventionally, burial grounds divided into northern and southern ones. Large burial mounds have a diameter of 45 to 105 m (148 to 344 ft); a height of 6–17 m (20–56 ft), medium-sized mounds, 25–38 m (82–125 ft), and 5–6 m (16–20 ft) respectively, and small 6–18 m (20–59 ft) and 0.8–2 m (2 ft 7 in – 6 ft 7 in). Six of the twenty mounds are fenced with a chain of 45 fences made of stone slabs and small stones. There are images of mountain goats, wild boars, wolves, and other animals, as well as other markings on a variety of plates. There are also symbols of the sun and circles depicting the Kazakh Tamga "eye". There found complex of underground passages with a total length of 55 m (180 ft) 6 large mounds. The height of the passageways are 1.68 m (5 ft 6 in) and the width 0.8 m (2 ft 7 in).

According to scientists, the Besshatyr complex was a sacred place for the Saka tribes, who for centuries have performed religious ceremonies, various religious rites, and offered sacrifices there. Barrows were not only a place of burial, but also a place of religious rites. Studies of 18 burial grounds of different sizes have given valuable scientific information about social groups, economy, life, customs, religious beliefs, architecture, weapons and equipment of the Saka tribe. In small burial grounds were buried ordinary soldiers and ordinary people. Military leaders and famous warriors were interred in the middle ones. Large burial grounds were intended for the burial of civilian and military leaders of the Saka tribes.

== Area ==
Next to the burial ground at Besshatyr are situated the Saka burial grounds Kzylauyz, Altyn-Emel, and Karashoky. Three kilometers (1.9 mi) to the southeast are located burials from a later period: Besshatyr Usuns II, consisting of 33 mounds; Kalkan I, with 118 burial vaults, and in the area of the Altyn-Emel pass, cemeteries of the same name, with 36 mounds. From this, it appears that the Saka tribe of Semirechye moved only in the warm season, and with the onset of winter, they went to wintering places. This gives new knowledge about the culture of the Saka tribes of Semirechye.

== Sources ==
- Бесшатыр, Казахстан. Национальная энциклопедия. — Алматы: Қазақ энциклопедиясы, 2004. — Т. I. — ISBN 9965938997 (in Kazakh)
- Железный век // Казахстан. Национальная энциклопедия. — Алматы: Қазақ энциклопедиясы, 2005. — Т. II. — ISBN 9965974632 (in Russian)
