= Issyk kurgan =

Burial mound in Kazakhstan

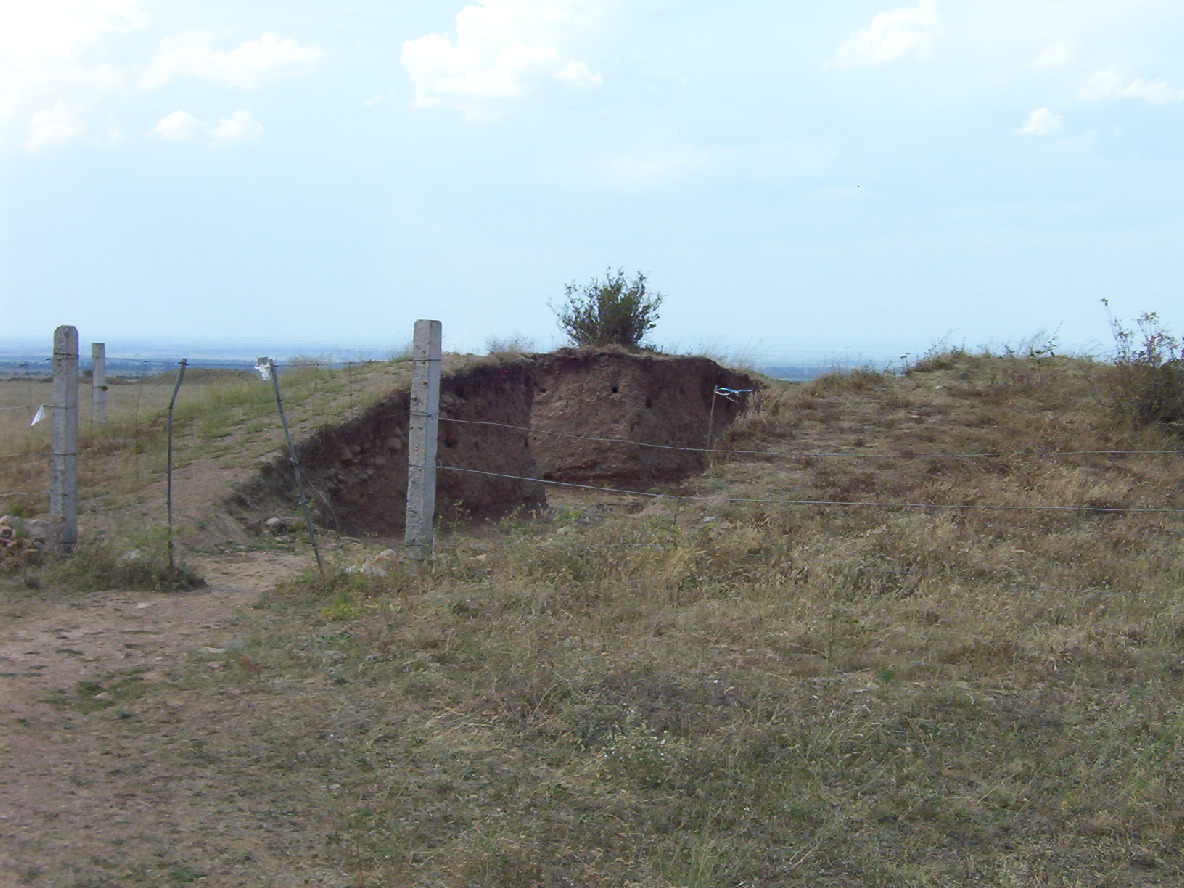
- One of the kurgans at Issyk

- Location within Continental Asia Location within Kazakhstan
- 43°19′48″N 77°37′07″E
- Type: Kurgan

The Issyk kurgan, in south-eastern Kazakhstan, less than 20 km east from the Talgar alluvial fan, near Issyk, is a burial mound discovered in 1969. It has a height of 6 meters (20 ft) and a circumference of 60 meters (200 ft). It is dated to the 4th or 3rd century BC. A notable item is a silver cup bearing an inscription, known as the Issyk inscription. The finds are on display in Astana. It is associated with the Saka peoples.

The burial complex is located on the left bank of the Issyk Mountain River, 50 kilometers (31 mi) to the east of the city of Almaty. The unique archaeological complex found by a small group of Soviet scientists led by archaeologist Kemal Akishevich Akishev in 1969. The burial ground consists of 45 large royal mounds with a diameter of 30 to 90 and a height of 4–15 meters (13–49 ft). The Issyk barrow is located in the western half of the burial ground. Its diameter is 60 meters (200 ft), and its height is 6 meters (20 ft).

== "Golden man" ==
Situated in eastern Scythia just north of Sogdiana, the kurgan contained a skeleton, warrior's equipment, and assorted funerary goods, including 4,000 gold ornaments. The skeleton may have been an 18-year-old Saka (Scythian) prince or princess, the sex is uncertain.

The richness of the burial items led the skeleton to be dubbed the "golden man" or "golden princess", with the "golden man" subsequently being adopted as one of the symbols of modern Kazakhstan. A likeness crowns the Independence Monument on the central square of Almaty. Its depiction may also be found on the presidential standard of Nursultan Nazarbayev.

=== Symbol of Kazakhstan ===
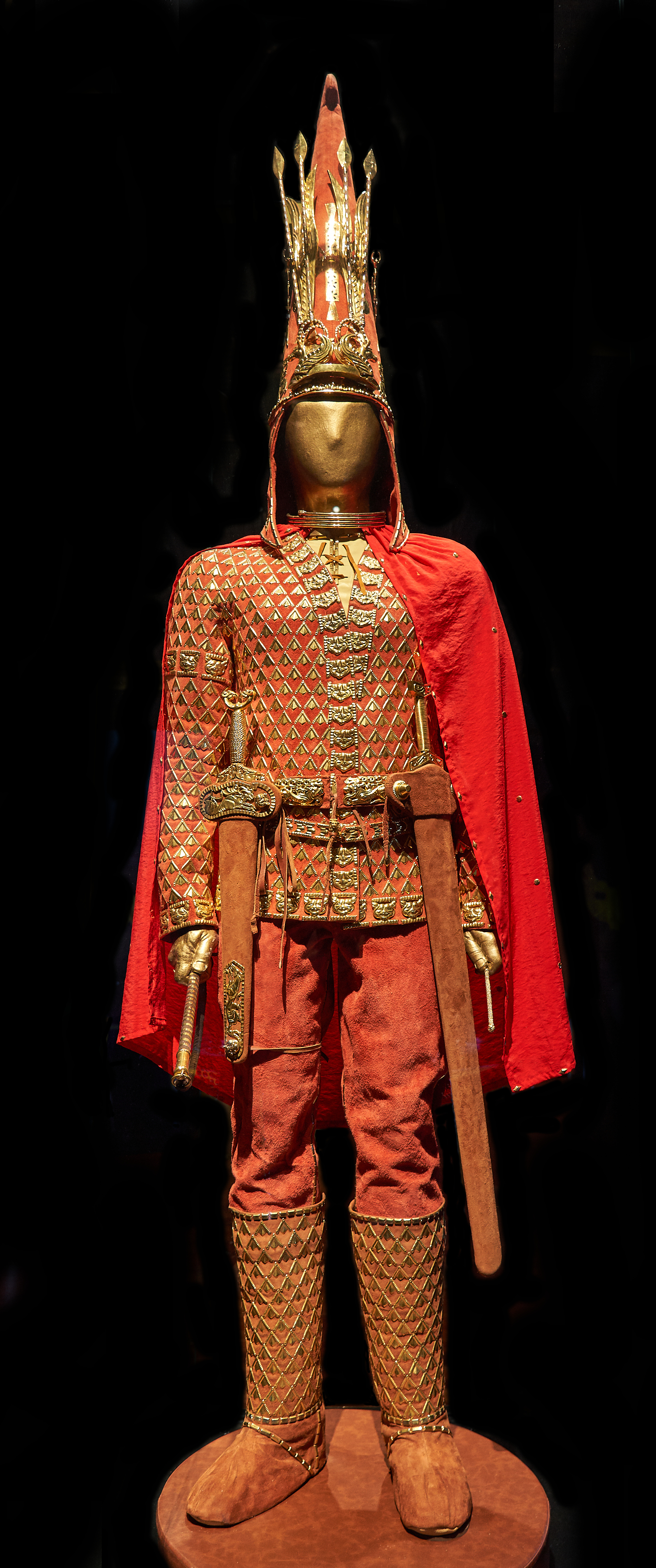
The Saka ruler, or "Golden Man"

The treasures of the Issyk mound and an exact copy of The Golden man are located in the Kazakh Museum of archaeology in Almaty city and in the State Museum of gold and precious metals of the Republic of Kazakhstan in Astana city. The Golden man on the winged leopard is one of the national symbols of Kazakhstan. Copies of the Saks warrior are installed in many cities of Kazakhstan. One of the copies crowns the Independence monument on the Republic square in Almaty city.

Altogether other five tombs with so-called Golden men were found in the country: the second Golden man found in the Araltobe barrow, the third in Chiliktinsk Kurgan Biglobe, the fourth near Astana city and fifth found in the burial ground Taldy Karkaralinsk district.

== Burials ==
There were two burials in the grave complex: the Central one and the Southern one (to one side). Unfortunately the Central burial site had been robbed but the side grave was undisturbed. The burial chamber in the side grave was constructed from spruce logs. The tomb and its contents remained intact and buried. The skeletal remains were found in the Northern half of the chamber.

More than 4,000 gold items were found in the chamber, as well as iron sword and dagger, a bronze mirror, vessels made of clay, metal and wood, shoes, headdresses, gold rings, statuettes, bronze and gold weapons, and an inscribed silver bowl dating from the 6th to 5th century BCE. Many clothing ornaments made of gold, a headdress and shoes were found on and under the remains. Next to the remains were an arrow with a gold tip, a whip (the handle of which was wrapped with a wide ribbon of gold in a spiral pattern) and a bag containing a bronze mirror and red paint.

Scientific research, particular that of the anthropologist O. I. Ismagulov, shows that the remains belong to a member of the Saka peoples of Semirecheye, who have a European appearance with an admixture of Mongoloid features. The age of the body at death is estimated at 16–18 years, and its sex is indeterminate. The form of clothing and method of burial suggest that "The Golden Man" was a descendant of a prominent Saks tribe leader, or a member of the royal family. Some Kazakh historians suggest that the burial belongs to Usun.

== The Issyk inscription ==
A text was found on a silver bowl in Issyk kurgan, dated to approximately the 4th century BC. The context of the burial gifts indicates that it may belong to Saka tribes.

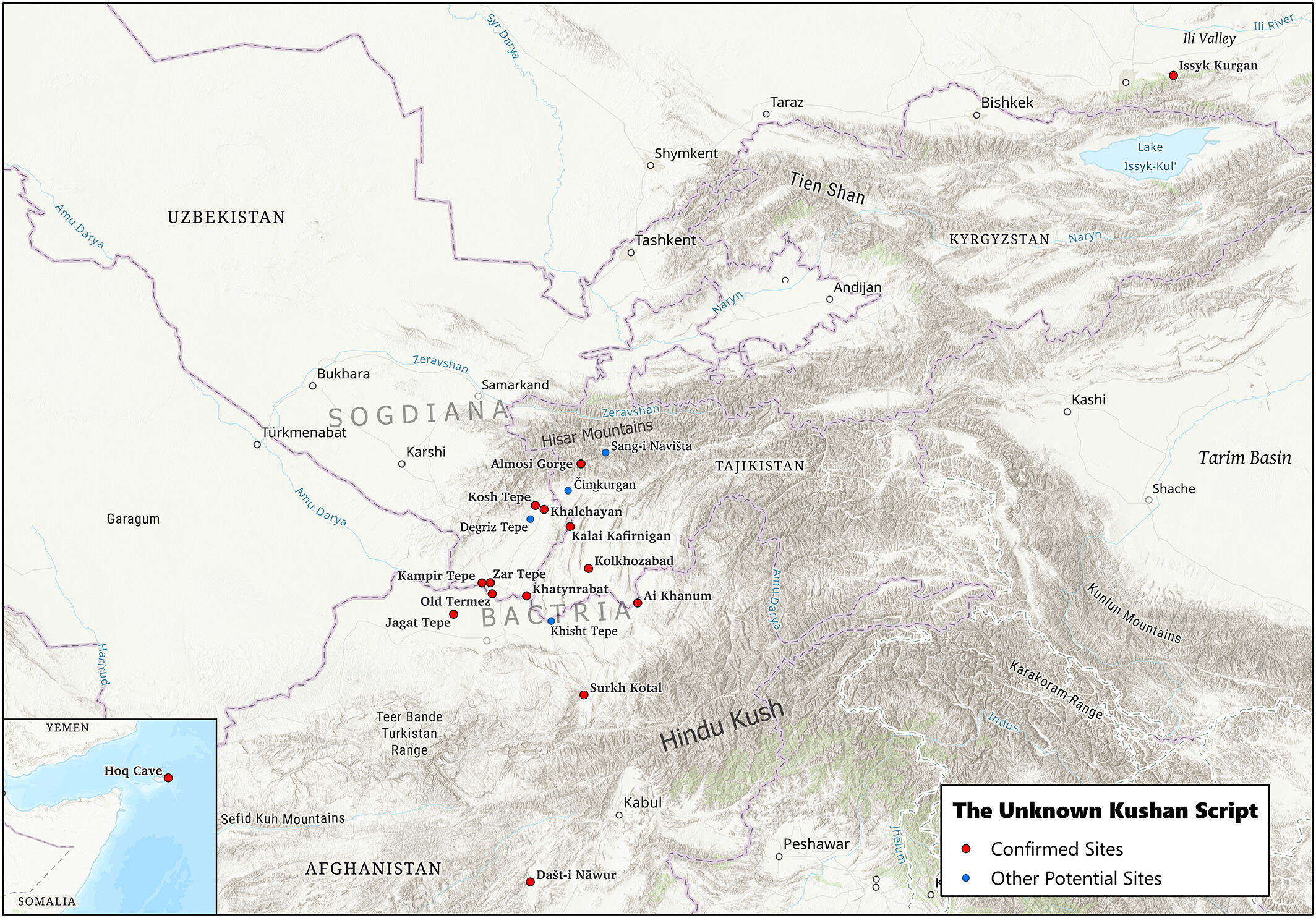
Sites with inscriptions in the unknown Kushan script, divided into confirmed and potential sites.

The Issyk inscription is not yet certainly deciphered, but was likely used by the Kushan Empire side by side with more common scripts such as Greek for the Bactrian language and Kharoṣṭhī for Gāndhārī during their rule from the western Tarim Basin to northern India. János Harmatta, using the Kharoṣṭhī script, identified the language as a Khotanese Saka dialect spoken by the Kushans. A 2023 analysis suggests an affiliation with Eastern Iranian languages, particularly "a missing link between Bactrian, Sogdian, the Saka languages, Old Ossetic/Alanic and ‘Old Steppe Iranian’ (and perhaps individual modern Iranian languages), participating in several isoglosses with one or the other of these languages, but with none of them exclusively". Bonmann identifies the Kushan script in multiple locations shown right, most notably the Dašt-i Nāwur inscription and previously unknown inscriptions in the Almosi gorge, Tajikistan. Bonmann also theorizes that the script is a direct derivative of the Aramaic alphabet, without the use of the Kharoṣṭhī script as an intermediary.

== Golden treasures in the kurgan ==
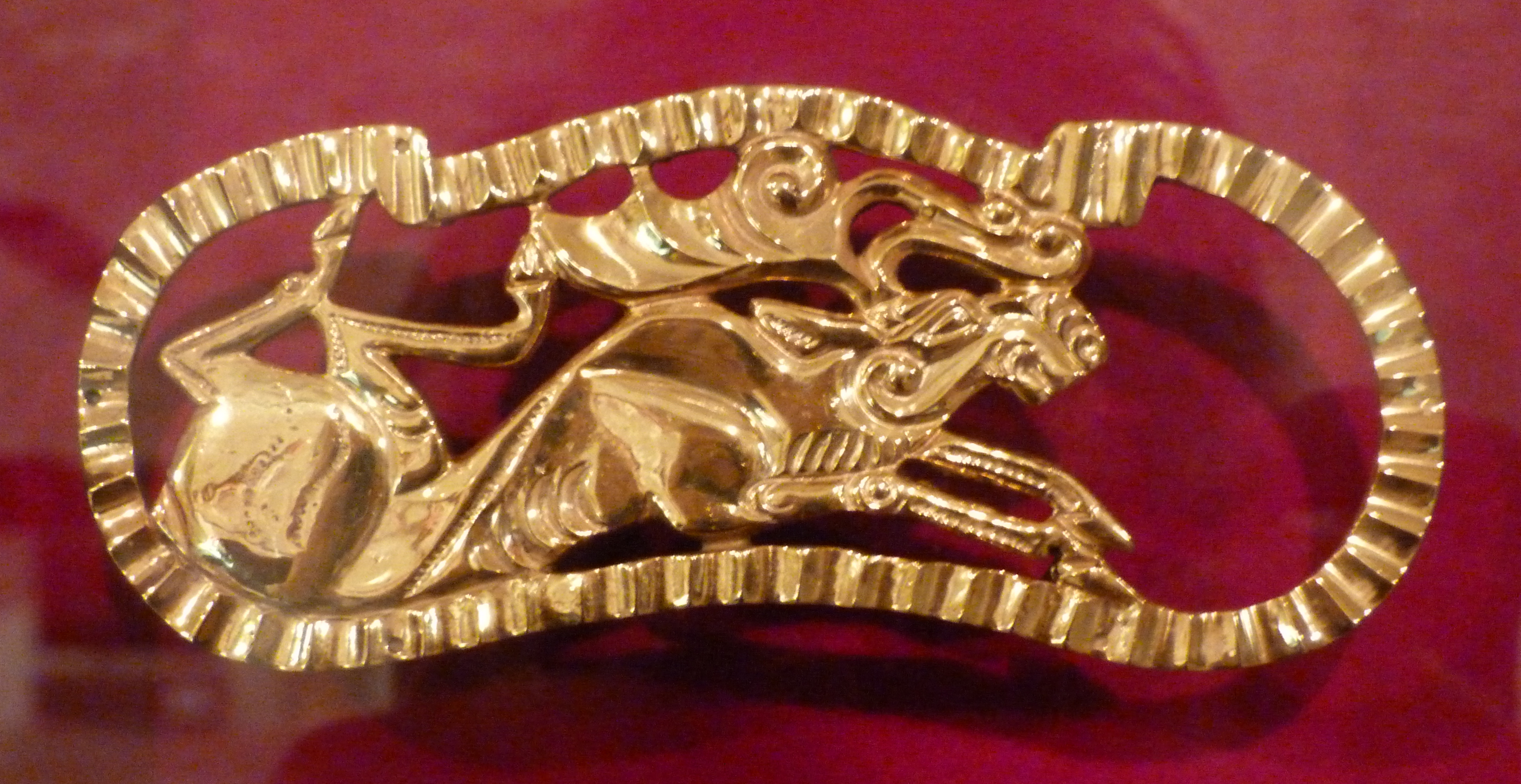
Elk. Burial mound Issyk (5th–4th centuries BC)

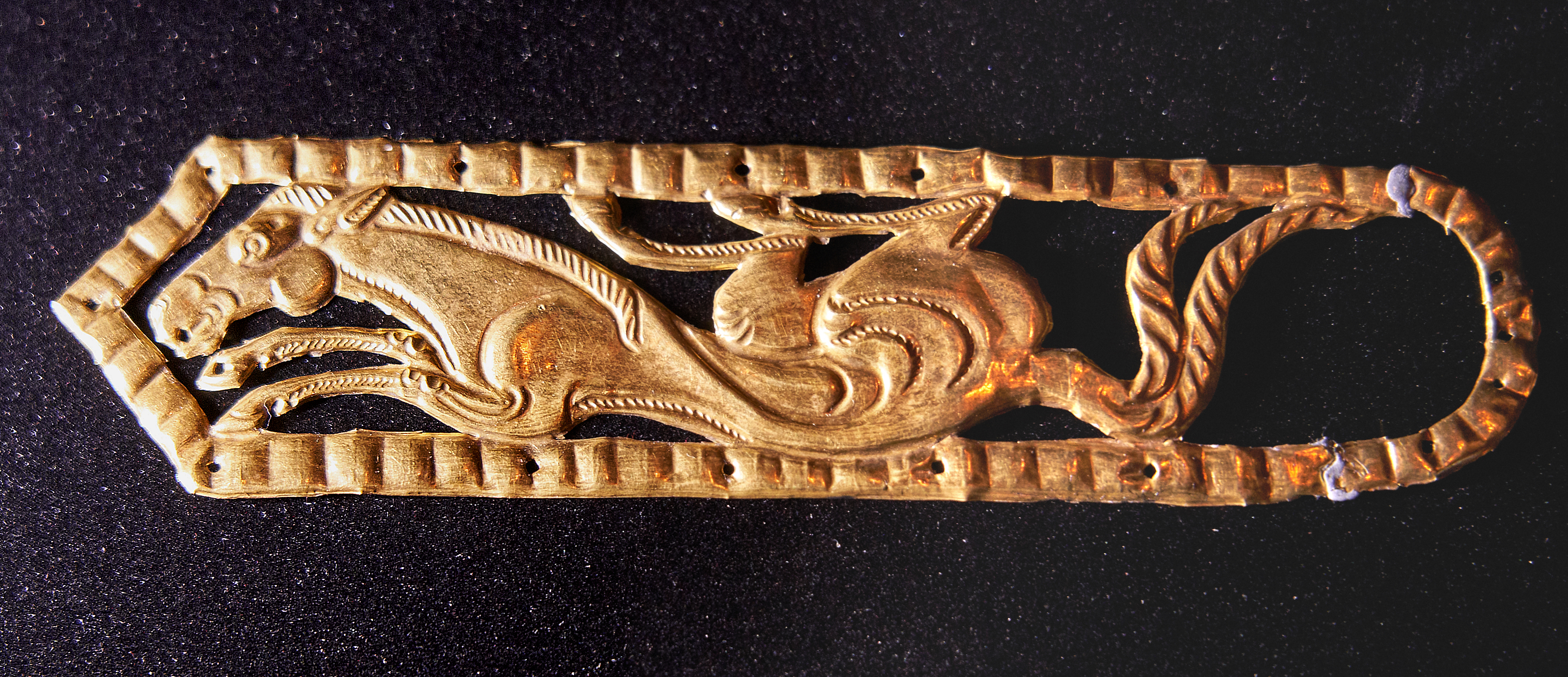
Horse. Burial mound Issyk (5th–4th centuries BC)

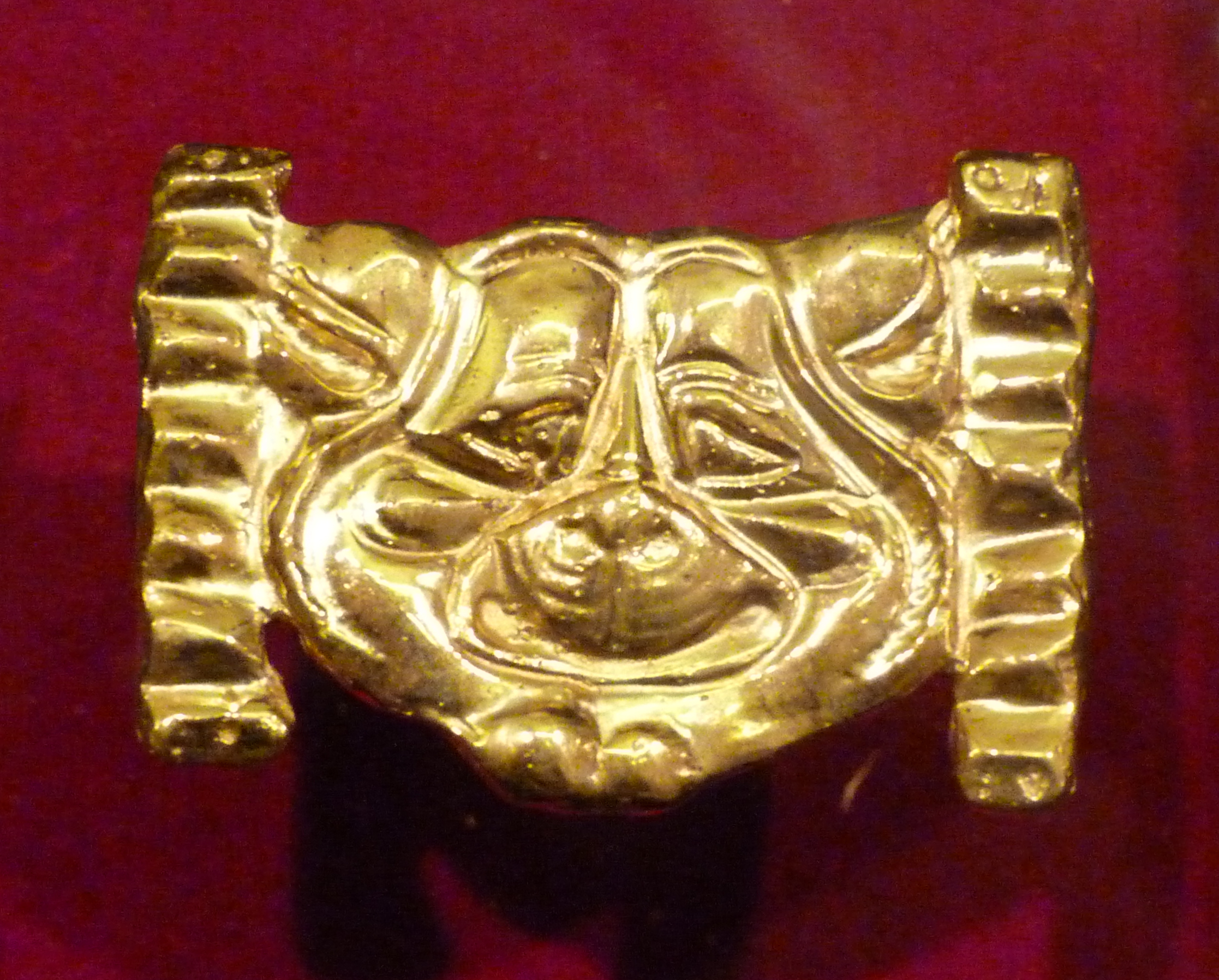
Head of tiger, burial mound Issyk (5th–4th centuries BC)

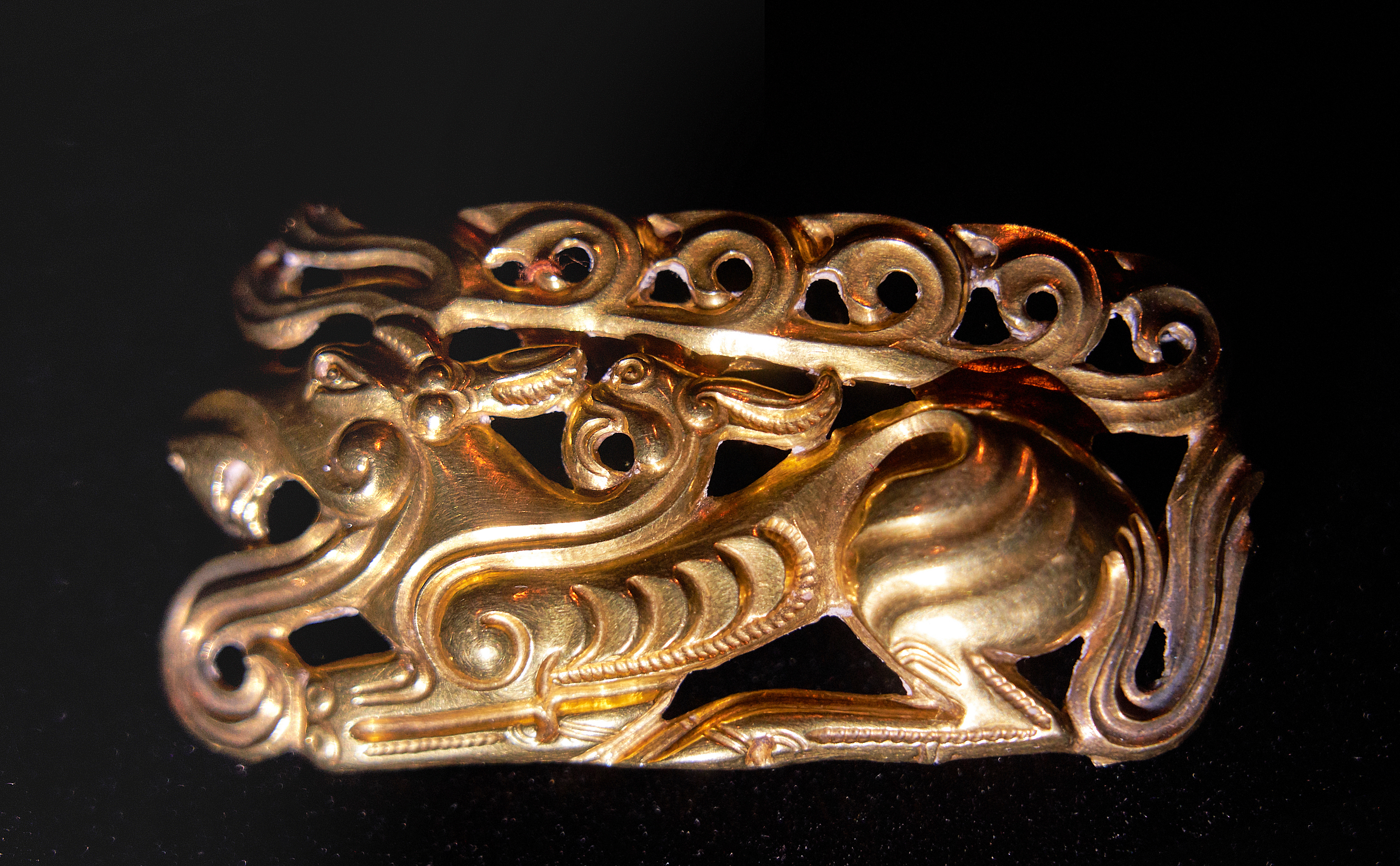
Flying elk with griffin burial mound Issyk (5th–4th centuries BC)

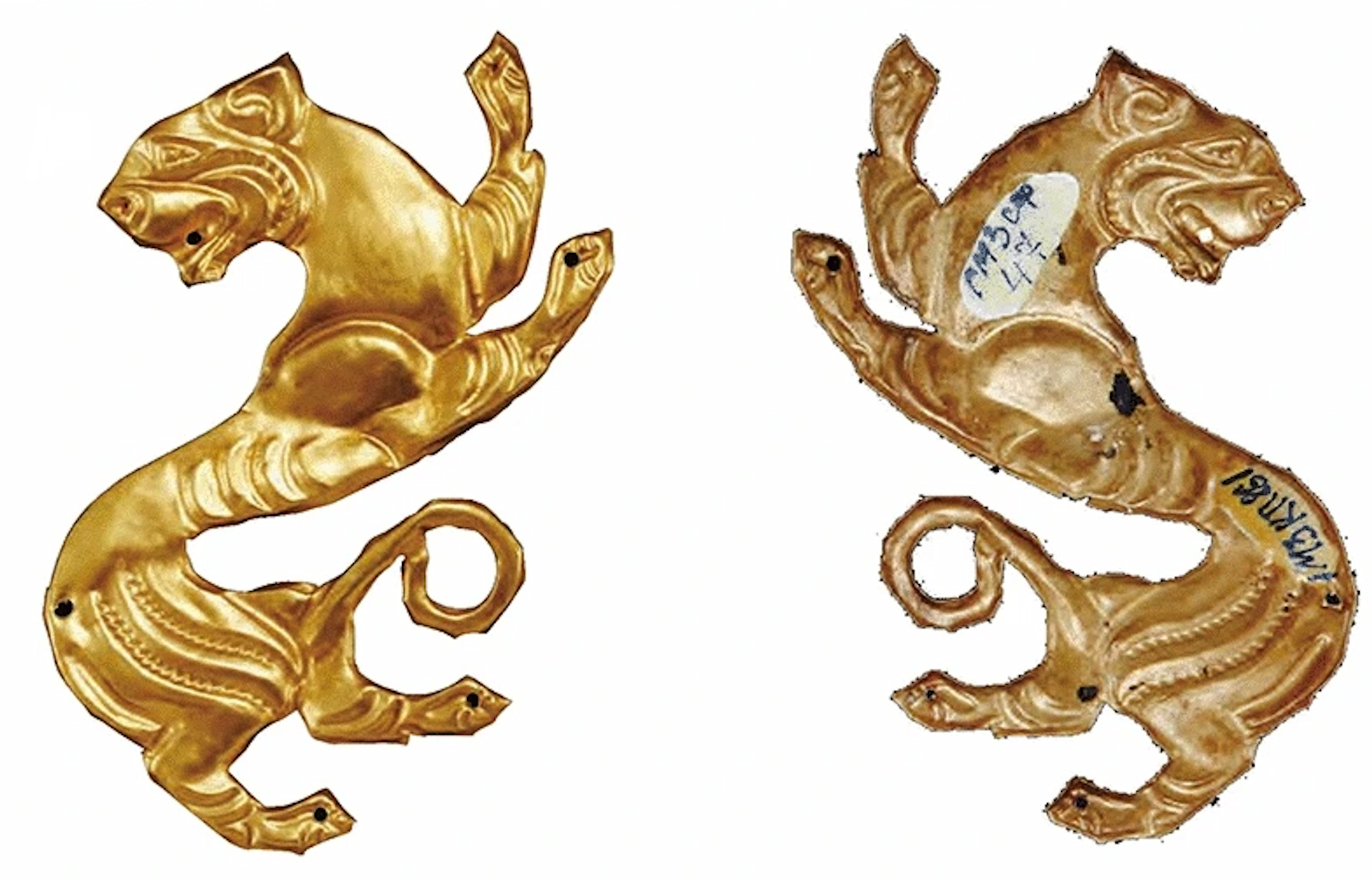
Gold plaques in tiger form, Issyk Kurgan, Kazakhstan

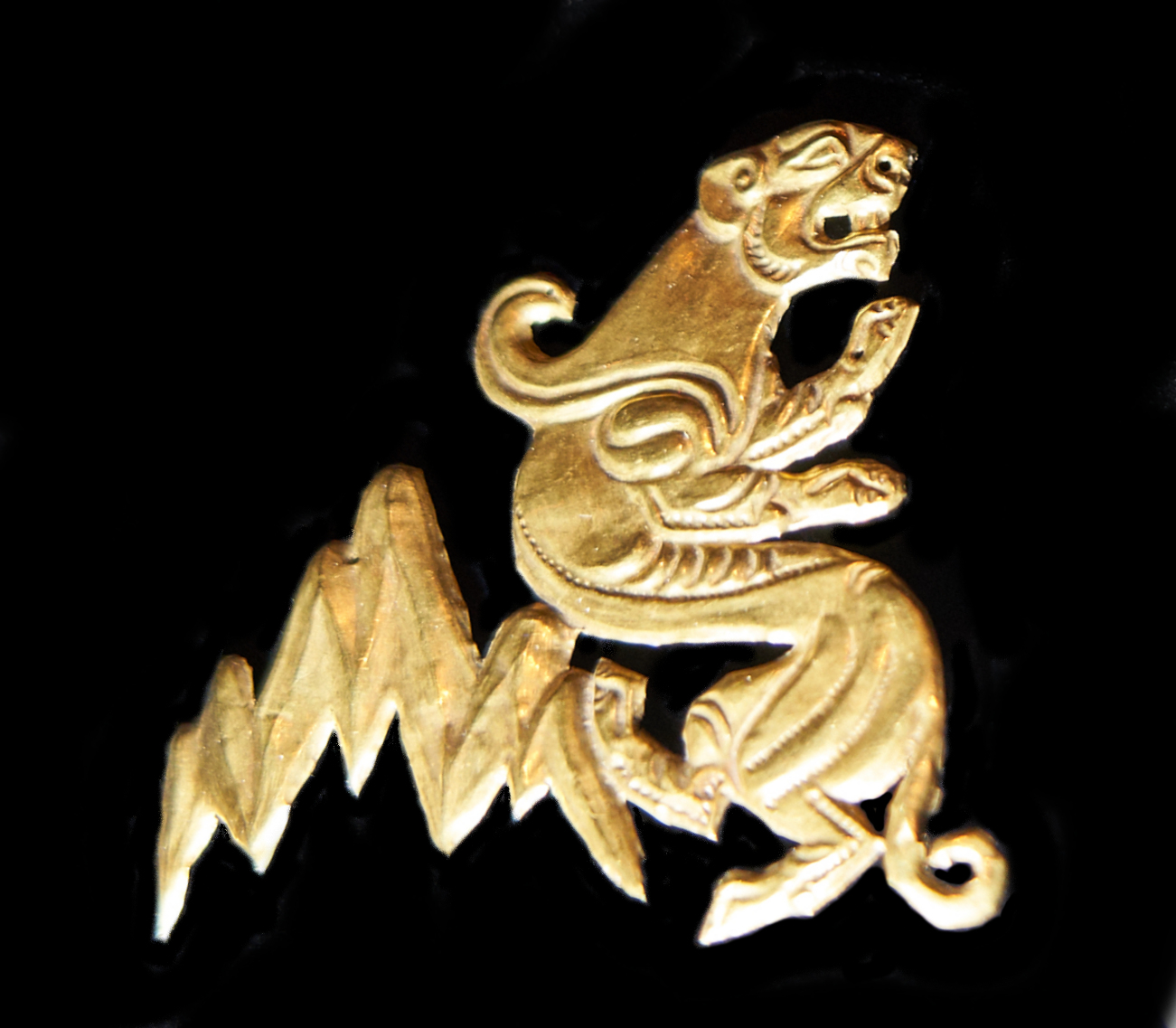
Leopard with mountain, Issyk Kurgan, 4th-3rd century BCE

== See also ==
- Issyk Golden Cataphract Warrior
