= Quddus Khojamyarov =

Kazakhstani composer

- Қуддус Хоҗамяров
- Born: May 21, 1918; Kaynazar, Turkestan ASSR, Russian SFSR, Soviet Union (present-day Kazakhstan)
- Died: April 8, 1994 (aged 75); Almaty, Kazakhstan
- Occupations: Composer; Teacher

Quddus Khojamyarov (Note: Uyghur: Қуддус Хоҗамяров, romanized: Quddus Khojamiarov; Kazakh: Құддыс Қожамиярұлы Қожамияров, romanized: Quddys Qozhamiyaruly Qozhamiyarov; Russian: Куддус Ходжамьярович Кужамьяров, romanized: Kuddus Khodzhamyarovich Kuzhamyarov) (May 21, 1918 – April 8, 1994) was a Uyghur and Soviet composer from Kazakhstan. He was named a People's Artist of the USSR.

He is best known for his Muqam melodies, often composing in 12 muqams. Notable compositions include Nazugum, regarded as the first Uyghur opera, Zolotyegorye (The Golden Mountains) (1960) and his Taklimakan symphony.

== Biography ==
Kuzhamyarov was born on May 21, 1918, in the modern village of Kaynazar in Enbekshikazakh District, Almaty Region, Kazakhstan. His father died when he was just 3 months old. From a young age he was distinguished by discipline, commitment, lack of youthful frivolity and common weaknesses. He did not smoke, drink and was innocent of the temptations in life. Kuzhamyarov was admitted to the College of Music and Drama in Alma-Ata (present-day Almaty College of Music named after P. I. Tchaikovsky, despite not yet being 16 years old. First, he went to college studying the violin, then switched to the piano, where he began composing music. He passed the examinations for the composition faculty of the Moscow Conservatory. However, due to World War II he had to postpone his studies; he was drafted into the army. In 1943, he joined the Communist Party.

After demobilization, he returned to Alma-Ata and in 1951 he graduated from the Alma-Ata Conservatory, under professor Yevgeny Brusilovsky, who cited Kuzhamyarov as a very important Uyghur musician. He finally left Alma-Ata and attended the Moscow Conservatory in the class of Professor Vissarion Shebalin from 1953. He taught in the years 1957–1967 years and became rector of the Alma-Ata State Conservatory in 1968, receiving the title of professor in 1965.

He is credited with creating the first Uyghur opera Nazugum (1956), Zolotyegorye (The Golden Mountains) (1960) and the ballet Chin Tomur (1967). The originality of the author's handwriting, is indicated in the search for national identity, embodied in a program of symphonic poem "Rizvana" (1950), for which he received the Stalin Prize of the third degree in 1951. He composed many chamber, instrumental and choral works, songs and ballads and music for dramatic productions. Strongly interested in the history of the Xinjiang region, he also wrote the Taklimakan symphony which according to him is "an expression of... the irrigation and cultivation of the desert", its disappearance by sandstorm and then "a foreshadowing of the future, in which the flourishing past will return."

He was a member of the Union of Composers of Kazakhstan and from 1955 to 1959 was its chairman. In the years 1959–1966 he was a member of the Committee on Lenin and USSR State Prize in Literature and Art. He was a participant in international festivals in Tehran in 1961 and Baghdad in 1964. He was elected a member of the Communist Party of the Kazakh SSR (1961–1967).

Towards the end of his life he composed a "Children's Album" consisting of 15 piano pieces based on his childhood memories and other lyrical works. In 1992, he lectured in the art college in Ürümqi, Xinjiang, China on Muqam music.

== Honours and awards ==
- Order of Lenin
- Medal "For the Victory over Germany in the Great Patriotic War 1941–1945"
- Order of the Badge of Honour
- Order of the Red Banner of Labour
- Order of the October Revolution
- Medal "Veteran of Labour"
- People's Artist of the Kazakh SSR
- People's Artist of the USSR
- Stalin Prize
