= Aktau Mountains =

Mountain range in Kazakhstan

The Aktau Mountains (meaning "White Mountains") are in the Almaty region of Kazakhstan.

== History ==
On the right Bank of the Ili river, South of the Altyn Emel ridge, sections of multicolored sedimentary layers of Paleogene and Neogene of lake and river origin have been preserved. The length of the mountains is about 30 kilometers.

The chalk mountains of Aktau are amazing in their beauty – a Museum of the distant past of the Earth, conquering with their grandeur and quaint canyons. In the dry channels of the gorge, large calcite crystals sparkle in the cliffs. The mountains are composed of a layer of stones with a multi-colored range of colors. These lifeless blue, red, white, pink, green slopes, curiously indented by erosion, are so extraordinary that it is impossible to look away. Slopes composed of fragile rocks, painted in all the colors of the rainbow, rose from the bottom of the ancient sea, and huge conical mountains resemble the pyramids of Egypt. The base of some mountains is ochre – yellow, the middle is red, and the top is white and blue. The white clays are probably the latest precipitation to fall at the bottom of the great lake. They formed the bulk of the White mountains. The most popular place in Aktau is the Red gorge, whose slopes are composed of red and yellow rocks. The gorge is crowned by a red mountain, shaped like a huge animal's paw. The tourists, the mountain is called "paw". It is surrounded by snow-white ridges and peaks and rises above them. Spring water and wind from year to year continue to hone their skills as a sculptor, creating a unique landscape of the area, striking with its splendor. The Cretaceous mountains of Aktau, which are a world-famous paleontological Deposit, where the remains of rhinoceroses, crocodiles, and turtles, estimated to be 25-30 million years old, are preserved in layers of Paleogene-Neogene lake sediments. Here you can find polbotinka accumulation of objects of flora, representatives of subtropical forms of ancient plants. P. P. who visited this area. Semenov-Tien-Shansky left the following evidence: "in Front of us towered melkosopochnik, which received the name Aktau from its white color, similar to the color of bleached rocks sulfatara. In Aktau there were deposits of alum and, according to local Kyrgyz, ammonia. The Chinese left everywhere traces of their mining experiments on sulfur, alum, and ore, according to their testimony, iron and silver – lead, as in Kalkan." The surface of the mountains is almost devoid of vegetation, only on rare pebbles stand out single saxaul bushes, contrasting their greenery with the red slopes of the mountains. The vegetation of the mountains is quite diverse, despite the fact that there is no fertile land here, only pebbles, sand and compressed clay. There are no signs of water in these areas. The animal world is represented by gazelles, wild goats (Teke) and kulans. This stretch of desert is considered untouched and wild. Staying in these mountains, you involuntarily fall out of modern time and come into contact with eternity. Landscapes existed thousands of years ago, as they were seen by our ancient ancestors, so we see them now.

== Tourism ==
The mountains are located on the Eastern edge of the Altyn – Altyn-Emel National Park. For the elderly and people with disabilities, you can display the object without walking around the surrounding area. The zone is part of a Specially protected natural area with the status of a nature conservation and scientific institution. Protection of the object is assigned to the administration of the state unitary enterprise "Altyn-Emel". Due to its location, the object has a favorable acoustic environment (silence, melodic sounds in nature). Recommended visiting periods: April–June; August–October.

== Sources of information about the monument ==
- Semenov Tian-Shansky P. p. Journey to Tian-Shan in 1856–1857. Moscow: State publishing house of geographical literature, 1946.
- Marikovsky P. I. in the deserts of Kazakhstan-M: "Thought" 1978.-125
- Golden cradle of the Zhetysu. Ed. "Golden book" 2009M. Ginatullin linguistic and Local history dictionary. - Almaty: Rarity, 2010
- Maryashev Monuments of Semirechye archeology and their use in excursions-Almaty, 2002
- A. P. Gorbunov Mountains Of Central Asia. Explanatory dictionary of geographical names and terms. Almaty, 2006
