= Esik =

Esik Eсik
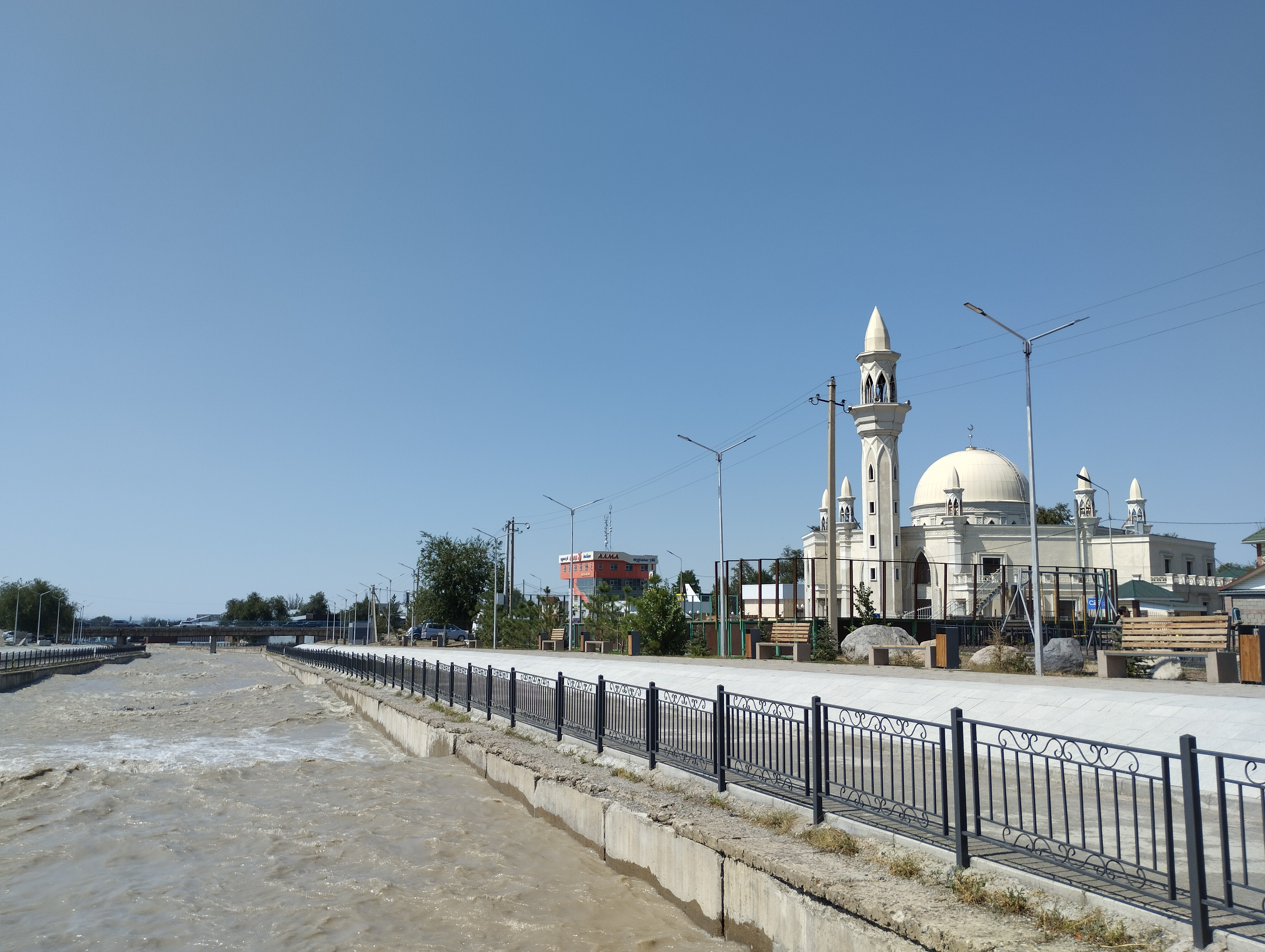

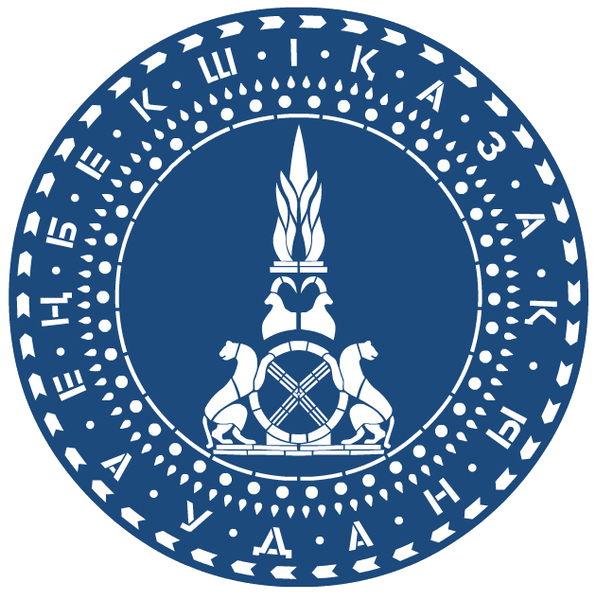
- Seal

- Location in Kazakhstan
- Coordinates: 43°21′N 77°28′E
- Country: Kazakhstan
- Region: Almaty Region
- First settled: XIX
- Founded: 1858
- Incorporated (city): 1968

Government
  - Akim (mayor): Zhan Kurametov

Area
  - Total: 25.8 km^{2} (10.0 sq mi)
- Elevation: 1,214 m (3,983 ft)

Population (2021 census)
  - Total: 41,018
- Time zone: UTC+6 (UTC)
- Postal code: 040400 (town)
- Area code: +7 72775
- License plate: 05, B

Esik (Kazakh: Есік, pronounced [jesɪ́k]), also spelled Yesik and Issyk, is a town in Almaty Region of Kazakhstan, the administrative center of Enbekshikazakh District. It is located on the Issyk River, at the foot of the Tian Shan, 53 km east of Almaty and 112 km over the mountains from Issyk Kul Lake. Population: 34,355 (2009 census results); 31,254 (1999 census results).

It was founded by Cossacks in 1858 as stanitsa Nadezhdinskaya. The Issyk kurgan of the famous "Golden Man" is nearby.

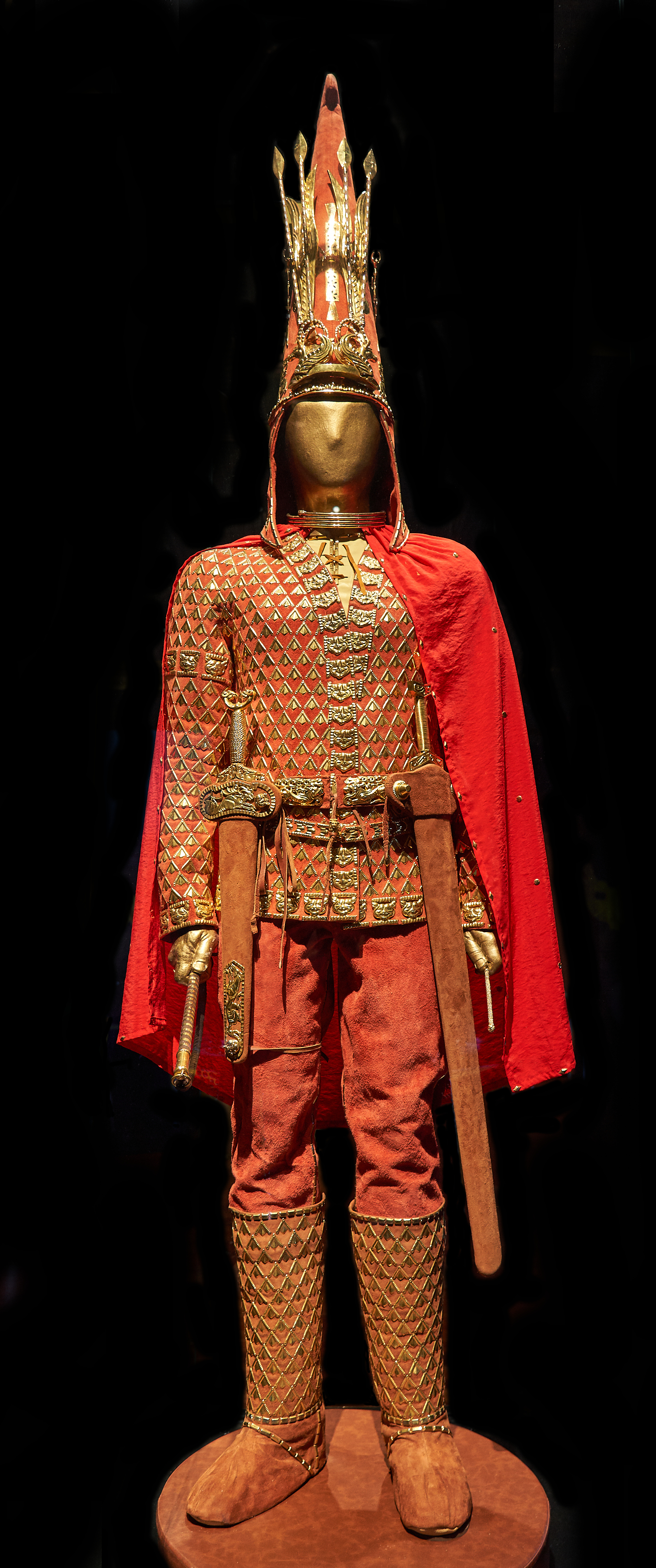
A cataphract-style parade armour from gold scales of Sakas' King found in Issyk in Kazakhstan in 1970

The nearby Issyk Lake (not to be confused with the much greater Issyk Kul Lake in Kyrgyzstan) is mostly famous for the way it was created (as a result of an ancient natural landslide damming a valley), destroyed (another natural landslide destroying that dam in 1963, with a subsequent damage to the city of Esik as well), and re-created (with human help).

== Enterprises ==
There are large enterprises such as "Koktem", "Esik Wine Factory", "Dionys", "Eles", "FoodMaster", "Gold Produkt". In addition, construction, transport, etc. institutions and small industrial enterprises.

== Climate ==
Climate data for Esik (1991–2020)
Month	Jan	Feb	Mar	Apr	May	Jun	Jul	Aug	Sep	Oct	Nov	Dec	Year
Mean daily maximum °C (°F)	0.3 (32.5)	2.2 (36.0)	9.0 (48.2)	16.7 (62.1)	21.8 (71.2)	27.0 (80.6)	29.6 (85.3)	28.6 (83.5)	23.4 (74.1)	15.8 (60.4)	7.6 (45.7)	2.1 (35.8)	15.3 (59.5)
Daily mean °C (°F)	−5.3 (22.5)	−3.4 (25.9)	3.4 (38.1)	10.9 (51.6)	15.8 (60.4)	20.8 (69.4)	23.2 (73.8)	22.1 (71.8)	16.9 (62.4)	9.7 (49.5)	2.0 (35.6)	−3.3 (26.1)	9.4 (48.9)
Mean daily minimum °C (°F)	−9.3 (15.3)	−7.4 (18.7)	−1.0 (30.2)	5.9 (42.6)	10.4 (50.7)	15.2 (59.4)	17.3 (63.1)	16.1 (61.0)	11.3 (52.3)	4.8 (40.6)	−1.9 (28.6)	−7.0 (19.4)	4.5 (40.1)
Average precipitation mm (inches)	38.3 (1.51)	42.0 (1.65)	65.5 (2.58)	102.2 (4.02)	93.3 (3.67)	50.9 (2.00)	41.9 (1.65)	30.0 (1.18)	27.3 (1.07)	49.2 (1.94)	62.0 (2.44)	45.2 (1.78)	647.8 (25.50)
Average precipitation days (≥ 1.0 mm)	6.7	7.3	9.0	10.0	8.9	7.3	5.8	4.1	3.6	5.8	7.5	7.3	83.3
Source: NOAA
