= Kimal Akishev =

Kimal Akishev (also spelled Kemal; Kazakh: Kemel Aqyshuly Aqyshev; 1924–2003) was a Kazakhstani scientist, archeologist, and historian. Akishev was a fifth generation descendant of the Argyn tribe head Chorman-bi. His parents were Abu Ali, or Akysh, and Gaziza Chorman. He was the youngest son of three sons and four daughters in the family, which lived in the South Siberia and Northern Kazakhstan. In accordance with a Turkic tradition, he was brought up by his grandfather Aujan Chormanov in the Keregetas mountains. In the 1930s both of his parents and three of his sisters died of starvation. He and his brothers were saved by his maternal uncle Kanysh Satpaev, and he grew up as Kimal Satpaev. Before graduation from a high school in Alma-Ata, he informally took the last name Akishev in memory of his father; in 1942 it became his official name. The next year he was drafted into the army, and in 1944 Akishev was badly wounded in his right arm, demobilized for disability, and returned to Alma-Ata. His arm was disabled for life.

In 1945 Akishev continued his education in the Kazan University, and completed his doctorate in Leningrad Branch of USSR Academy of Sciences Archeological Institute. From 1954 he headed a series of archeological expeditions, among which were excavations of the Otrar city, Saka pyramids in Besshatyr, and Issyk kurgan, which brought him into international prominence.

Akishev authored over 200 scientific works, monographs, textbooks, and articles. Many of them were translated into various languages. A number of his works were co-authored with his wife, archeologist A.K. Akishev. In his works, Akishev developed periodization of history and cultures, analyzed social and economic relations during the Bronze Age, the origin of agriculture and nomadic cattle husbandry; nomadic social and political organization, art and mythology of the Saka, and medieval city civilizations. His 1967 contribution to the collective work Ancient Culture of Central Kazakhstan was awarded a Kazakh SSR Academy of Sciences Shokan Walikhanuli (Ch.Ch.Valihanov) premium. In 1982, Akishev won a Kazakh SSR State premium. In 1989 he was elected a corresponding member of the German Archeology Institute.

== Publications ==
- Ancient culture of Sakas and Usuns in the valley of r. Ili, Alma-Ata, 1963 (in Russian)
- Issyk Kurgan, Moscow, Science, 1978 (in Russian)
- "Problem of chronology of Saka culture early phase". Archaeological sites of Kazakhstan, Alma-Ata, Science, 1978 (in Russian)
- Ancient gold of Kazakhstan, Alma-Ata, 1983 (in Russian)
- Art and mythology of Sakas, Alma Ata, Science, 1984 (in Russian)
- "Kushan royal tamgas". Art and mythology of Sakas, Alma Ata, Science, 1984 (in Russian)
- "Issyk script and runiform writing". Ancient Türkic civilization: monuments of writing. (Materials of international scientific theoretical conference), Astana-Almaty, 2001, p. 389-395 (with summary in English)
