= Enbekshikazakh District =

Coordinates: 43°21′N 77°28′E

Enbekshikazakh
- District
- Еңбекшіқазақ ауданы
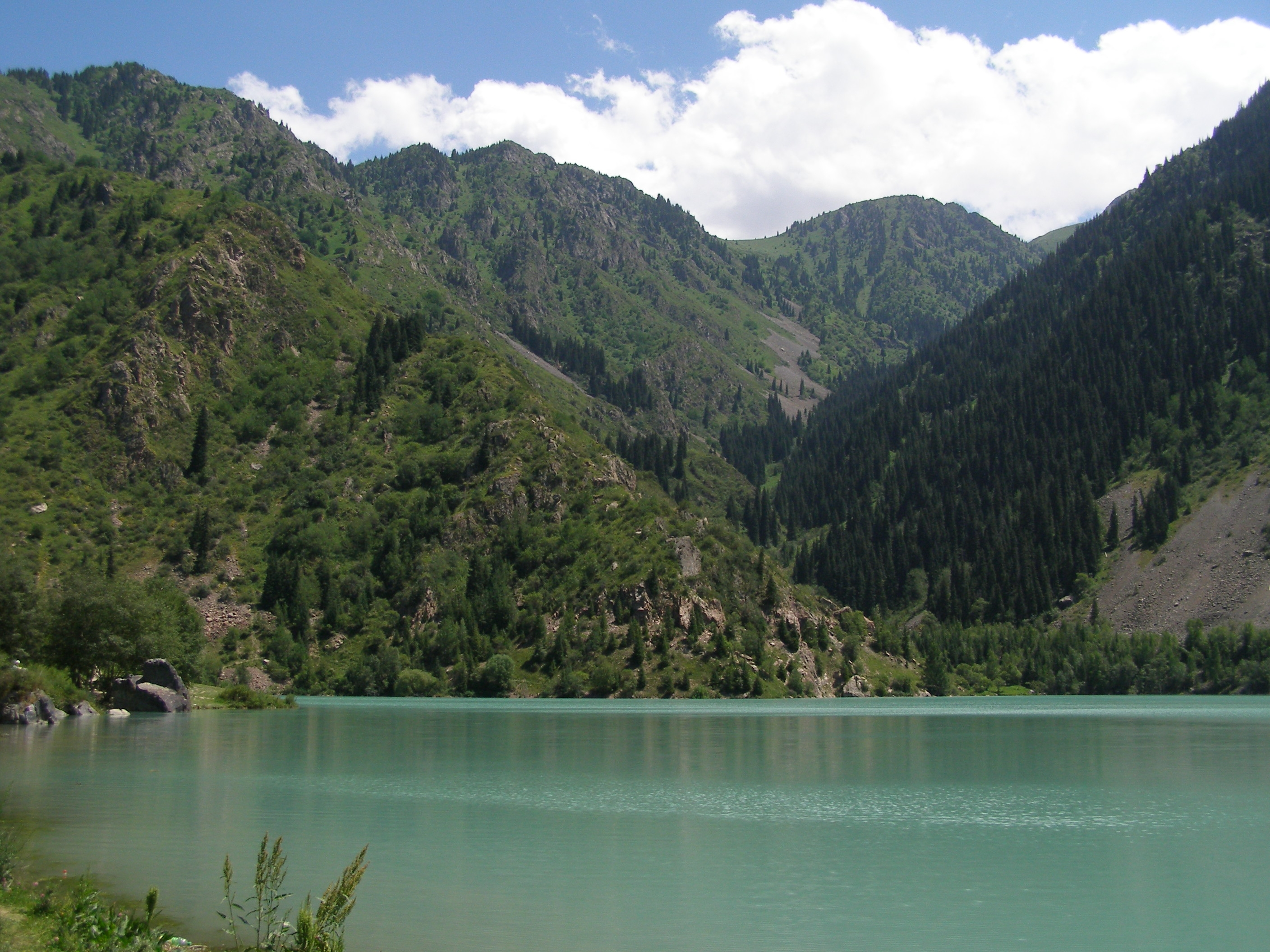
- Lake Issyk, in Enbekshikazakh District

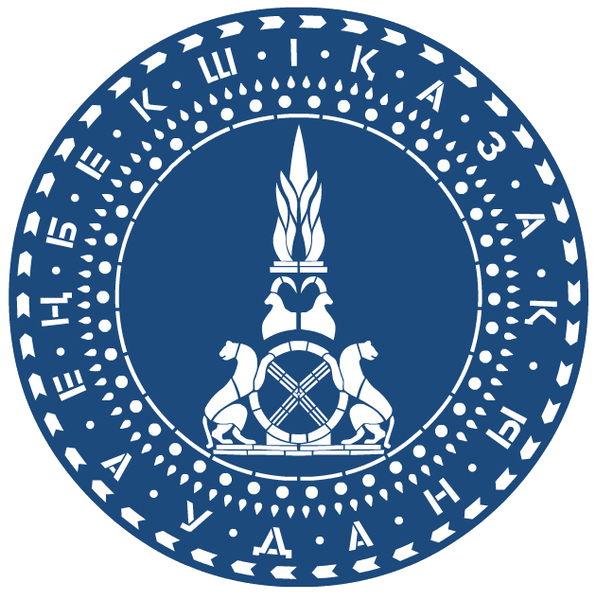
- Coat of arms

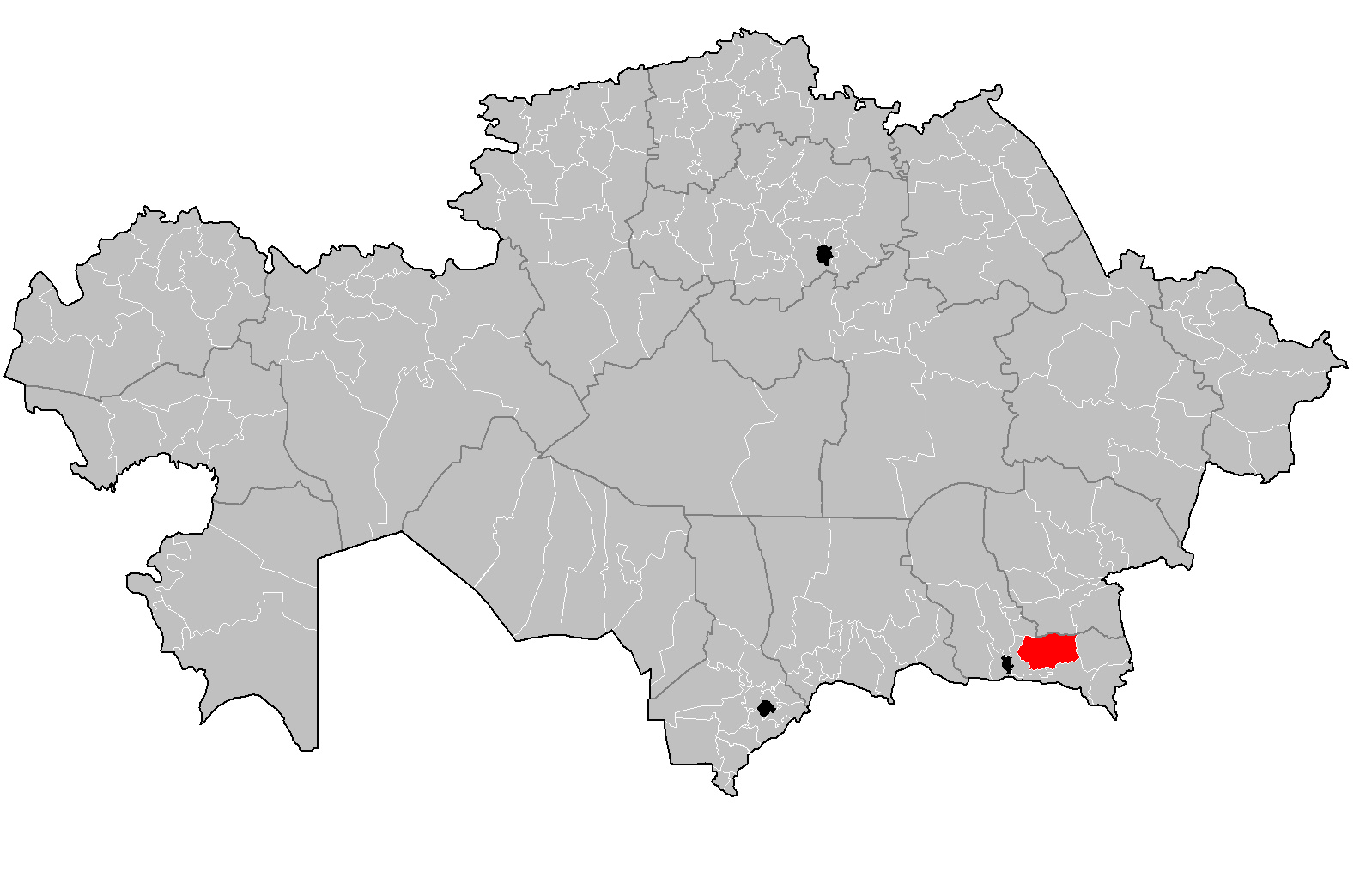
- Country: Kazakhstan
- Region: Almaty Region
- Administrative center: Esik
- Founded: 1928

Government
  - Akim (mayor): Dosumbaev Altai Mashikovich

Area
  - Total: 3,200 sq mi (8,300 km^{2})

Population (2013)
  - Total: 278,538
- Time zone: UTC+6 (East)

Enbekshikazakh District (Kazakh: Еңбекшіқазақ ауданы, Eñbekşıqazaq audany) is a district of Almaty Region in Kazakhstan. The administrative center of the district is the town of Esik. Population: 278,538 (2013 estimate); 257,506 (2009 census results); 202,659 (1999 census results).

== Geography ==
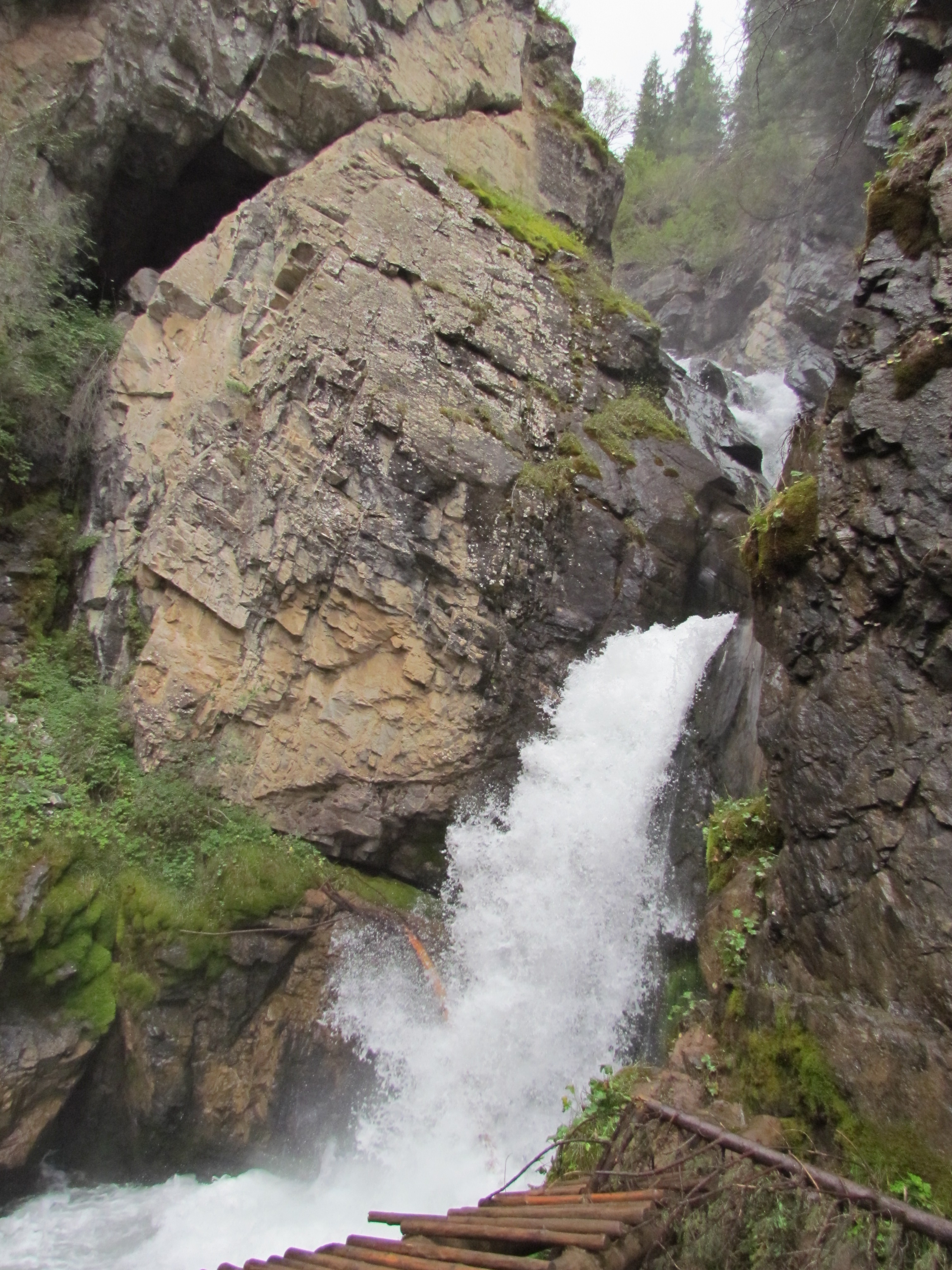
Kairak Waterfall

The south, and east parts of district have mountainous landscape, while the northern parts consist of plains (Ili valley). The highest point in the district, the Saz mountain, is covered with permanent snow. The terrain has a slope towards the Kapchagay Reservoir.

Having mild winters and hot summers, the district's climate is continental; in January, temperatures are between -6 and -10°С, and in July, temperatures are 20—24°С. Annual precipitation is 200—400 millimeters, increasing to 550—700 millimeters near the mountains.

There are a lot of rivers in Enbekshikazakh District, including Issyk, Turgen, Kiikbay, Sholak, Shybykty, Belshabdar, Karaturyk, Lavarsaz, Asy and Chilik. The Konayev Canal (or Big Almaty Canal) passes through the district. Hydroelectric power stations are built on some of the rivers. In addition to the rivers, the district has lakes, including Issyk, Jasylkol and others.

The non-mountainous part of the region is mostly semi-desert. Mountainous areas are affected by altitudinal zonation; steppes first changing to forests, and then switching to montane grasslands and shrublands. The district has some protected areas, including Almaty Conversation, Issyk Kurgan, Shynturgen Refuge, and the Ile-Alatau National Park which partially lies within the district boundaries.

== History ==
The district was formed in 1928 as Syugatin District. Then, in 1929, it was renamed to Enbekshikazakh. First, the district's center was situated in Kara-Kemir. In 1932, it was moved to Esik city. In 1997, Chilik District's territory was added to Enbekshikazakh District.

== Notable people ==
- Quddus Khojamyarov (1918–1994), composer
