= Lake Issyk =

Lake in southeastern Kazakhstan

Issyk Lake
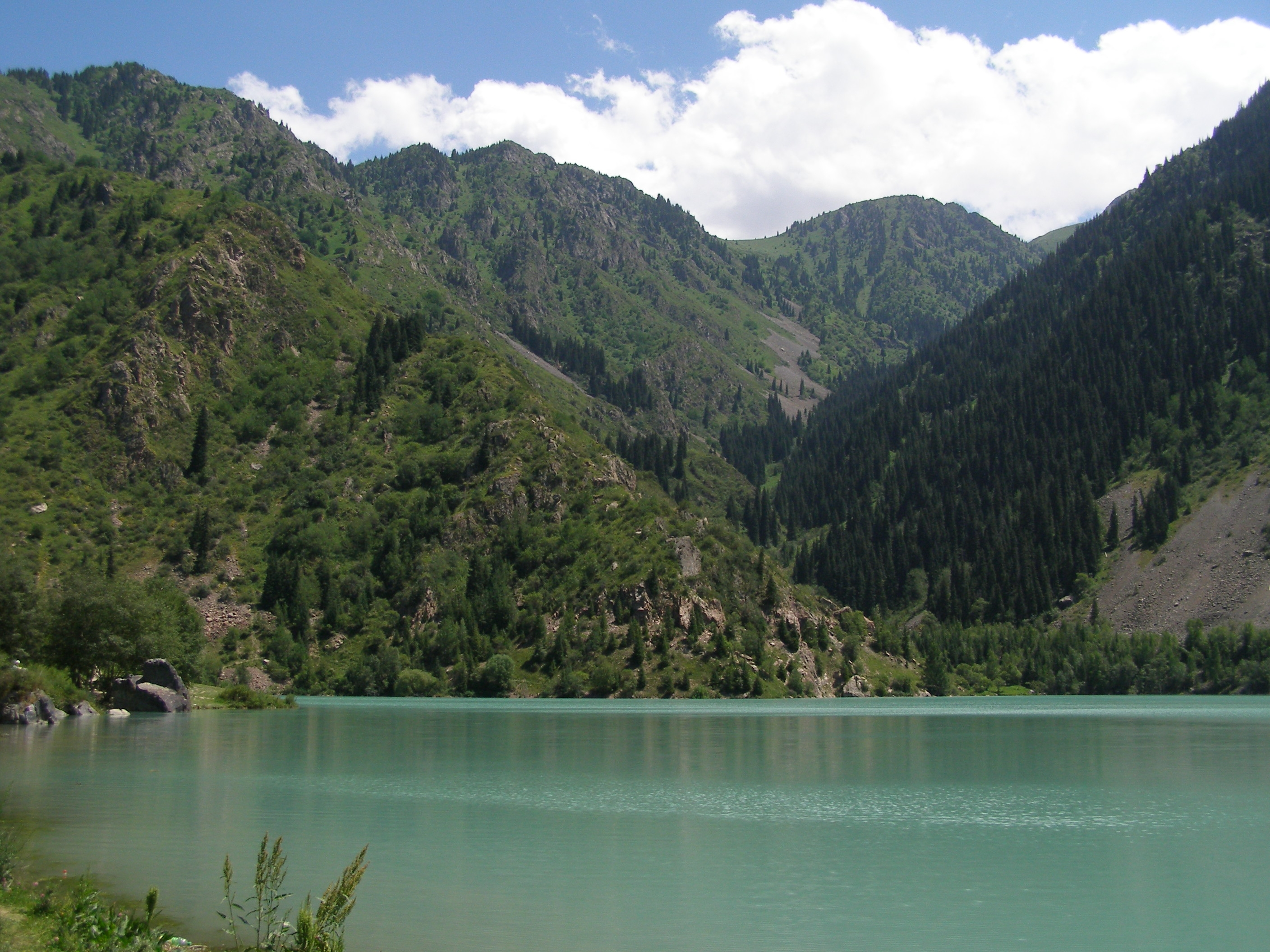
- Lake Issyk in July 2010

- Location within Kazakhstan Location within Asia
- Coordinates: 43.2531°N 77.4847°E
- Basin countries: Kazakhstan

The Lake Issyk also known as Issyk Lake (Kazakh: Есік көлі, romanized: Esık kölı) is a lake in Kazakhstan fed by the Issyk River.

== History ==
It is estimated that the lake was formed about 8-10 millennia ago, as a result of a catastrophic earthquake that caused the collapse of the right slope of the gorge. After the collapse, debris blocked the gorge and created a dam about 300 meters tall. A lake formed behind the dam was about 1,850 meters long, 500 meters wide and 50 to 79 meters deep, located at an altitude of 1,756 meters. The lake became known in Russia and Europe by the middle of the 19th century, after the formation of the village of Nadezhdinskaya at the mouth of the gorge. One of the first researchers was the geographer Semenov Tien-Shansky, who mentioned the lake in his diaries: "we were delighted to see at our feet the "Green lake" (in Kazakh "Jasyl-Kol"), which had the purest and most transparent, thick bluish-green color of the TRANS-Baikal beryl. Beyond the lake rose a bold and steep jagged ridge of high squirrel ... this mountain the guide called Issyk-bash."

The Caspian tiger was found in the Issyk gorge and around the lake at least at the beginning of the 1900s and is mentioned in the diaries of Pyotr Semyonov-Tyan-Shansky.

The lake is mostly famous for the way it was created (an ancient natural landslide damming a valley), destroyed (another landslide destroying that dam in 1963, with a subsequent flood damaging the city of Esik), and re-created (with human help).

In 2019, the road surface was restored at the dam and parking was organized right on the ridge. Infrastructure for camping has been created, gazebos, tables and benches have been built, and fireplaces organized.

== Threat to the lake due to the construction of a hydropower plant ==
In 2005, "BTA Bank" and a private company LLP "EnergoAlem" proposed a project to build more than four private hydroelectric power plants (HPPs) along the river below the Issyk Lake mudflow protection dam. The peculiarity of these HPPs is that their operation is possible only by regulating the flow in the river by discharging from the reservoir of Lake Issyk. In 2008 the first HPP-2 was put into operation at the expense of financing of "BTA Bank" and "EnergoAlem" LLP. At the end of 2019 the second "HPP-1" was put into operation. Immediately after the commissioning of "HPP-1", the water level in the lake and the river below it dropped as much as possible, almost to the point of emptying. In June 2020, the public, environmentalists, and residents of the town of Esik were outraged by what was happening to the lake and called on the authorities to prevent an environmental disaster.

Earlier in 2016, during the start of construction of HPP-1, local residents sounded the alarm by appealing to the Emergency Committee of the Ministry of Internal Affairs of the Republic of Kazakhstan. In the appeal it was noted that construction with the use of drilling and blasting is carried out near the mudflow protection dam of the lake without a working draft and any permits. KChS responded to the appeal that "KazSeleZashchita" State Institution conducted a survey of the territory near the mudflow protection dam, which found that drilling and blasting operations were carried out behind the dam on Lake Issyk (downstream the Yesik River at a distance of about 250–300 meters). The branch of the State Institution Kazselezaschita of the Ministry of Internal Affairs and the Department of Emergency Situations of Almaty Oblast were not notified of these works. The branch of GU Kazselezaschita KChS MIA initiates the issue of informing the prosecutor's office of Almaty region regarding the threat of violation of the integrity of the Issyk Lake mudflow retaining dam".
