= Altyn-Emel National Park =

National park in Kazakhstan

Altyn-Emel State National Nature Park
- «Алтынемел» мемлекеттік ұлттық табиғи паркі (Kazakh); Государственный национальный природный парк «Алтын-Эмель» (Russian)
- IUCN category II (national park)
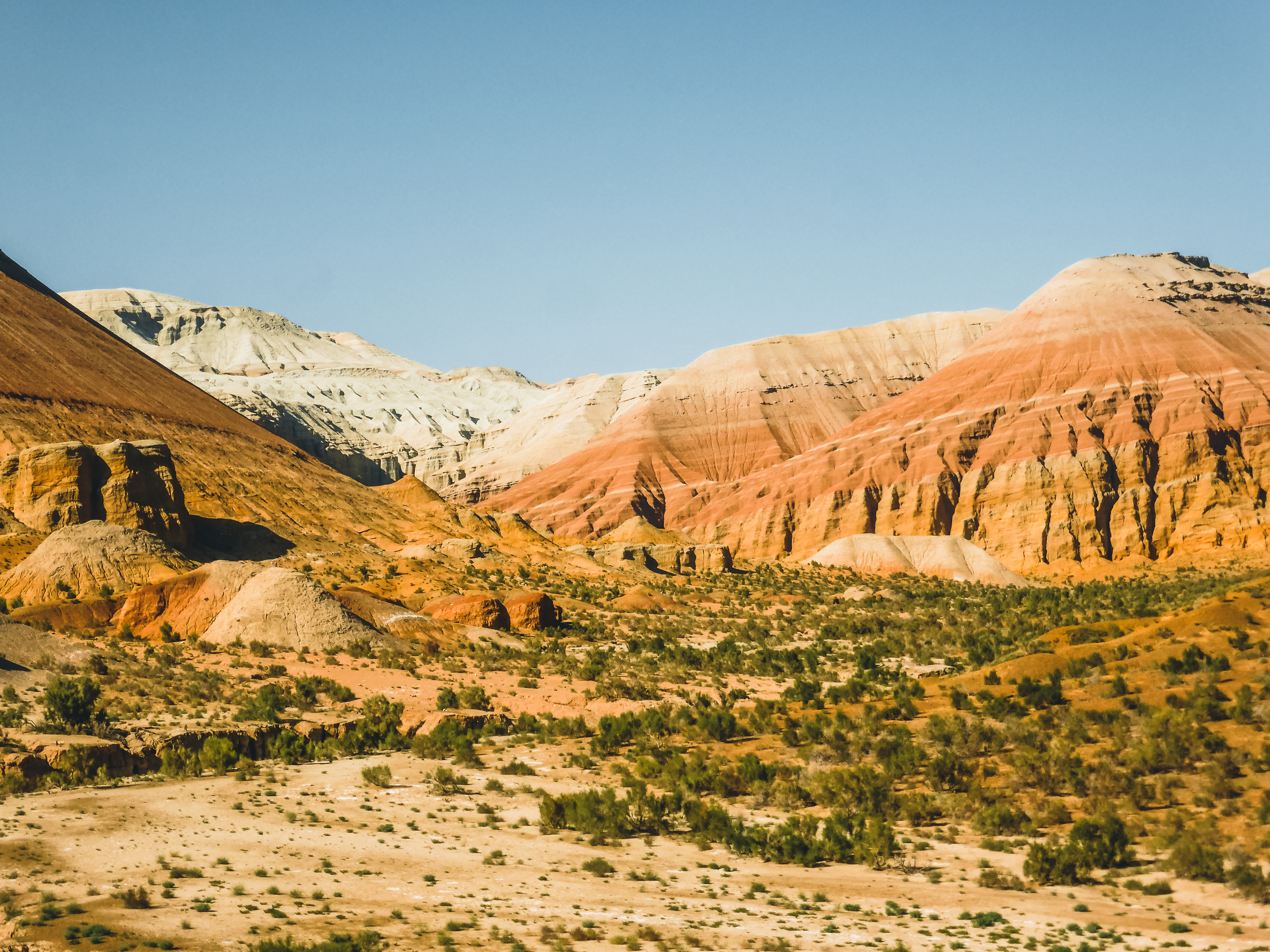

- Location within Kazakhstan Location within West and Central Asia
- Location: Almaty Region Kazakhstan
- Coordinates: 44°20′0″N 78°26′0″E
- Area: 460,000 ha
- Established: 10 April 1996; 30 years ago

UNESCO World Heritage Site
- Official name: Cold Winter Deserts of Turan
- Type: Natural
- Criteria: ix, x
- Designated: 2023 (45th session)
- Reference no.: 1693

The Altyn-Emel State National Nature Park (Note: Kazakh: «Алтынемел» мемлекеттік ұлттық табиғи паркі, romanized: „Altynemel“ memlekettık ūlttyq tabiği parkı; Russian: Государственный национальный природный парк «Алтын-Эмель», romanized: Gosudarstvennyj nacionaljnyj prirodnyj park „Altyn-Emelj“) is a national park in Kazakhstan. It was created in 1996. The park covers about 4,600 km^{2} (1,800 sq mi) between the Ili River and the Aqtau mountain range, near Lake Kapchagai, and consists mostly of desert and rocky terrain.

== Features ==
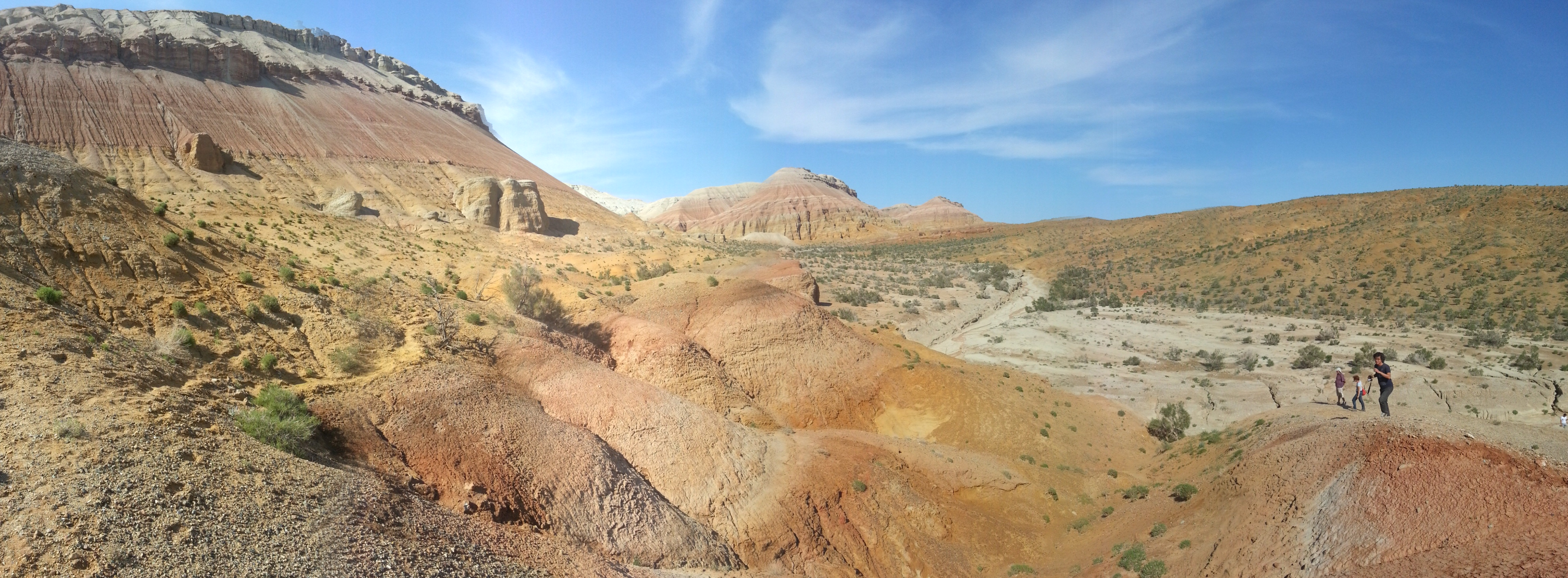
Altyn Emel - Aktau

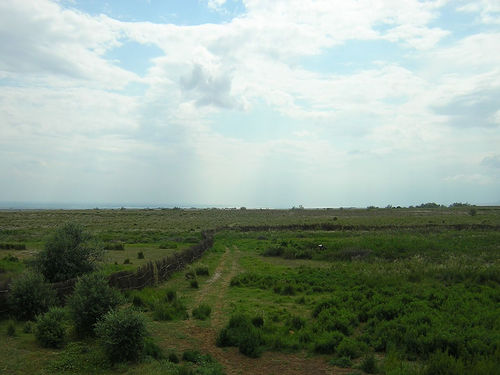
Steppe in Altyn-Emel National Park

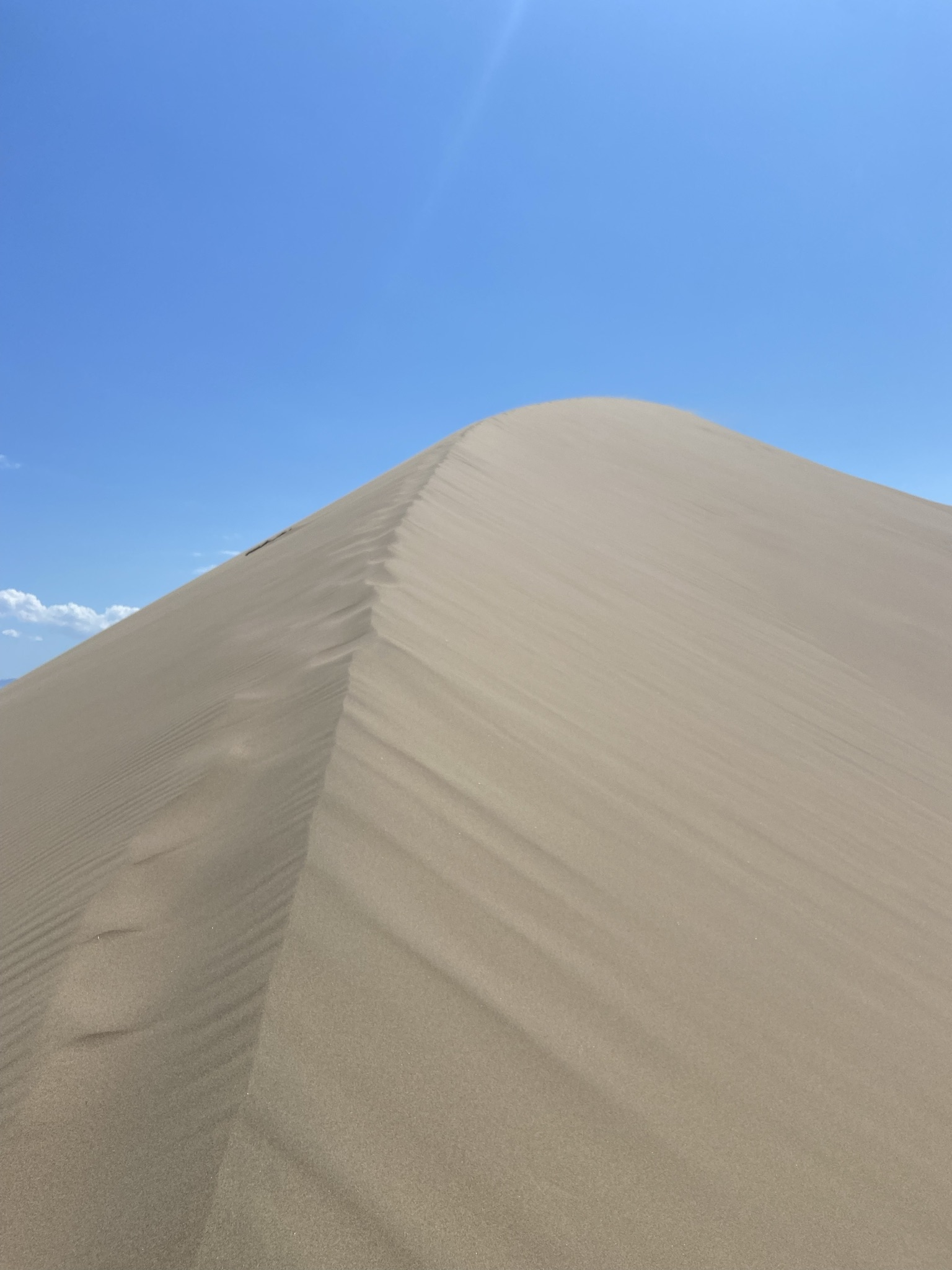
Singing dune in Altyn-Emel National Park

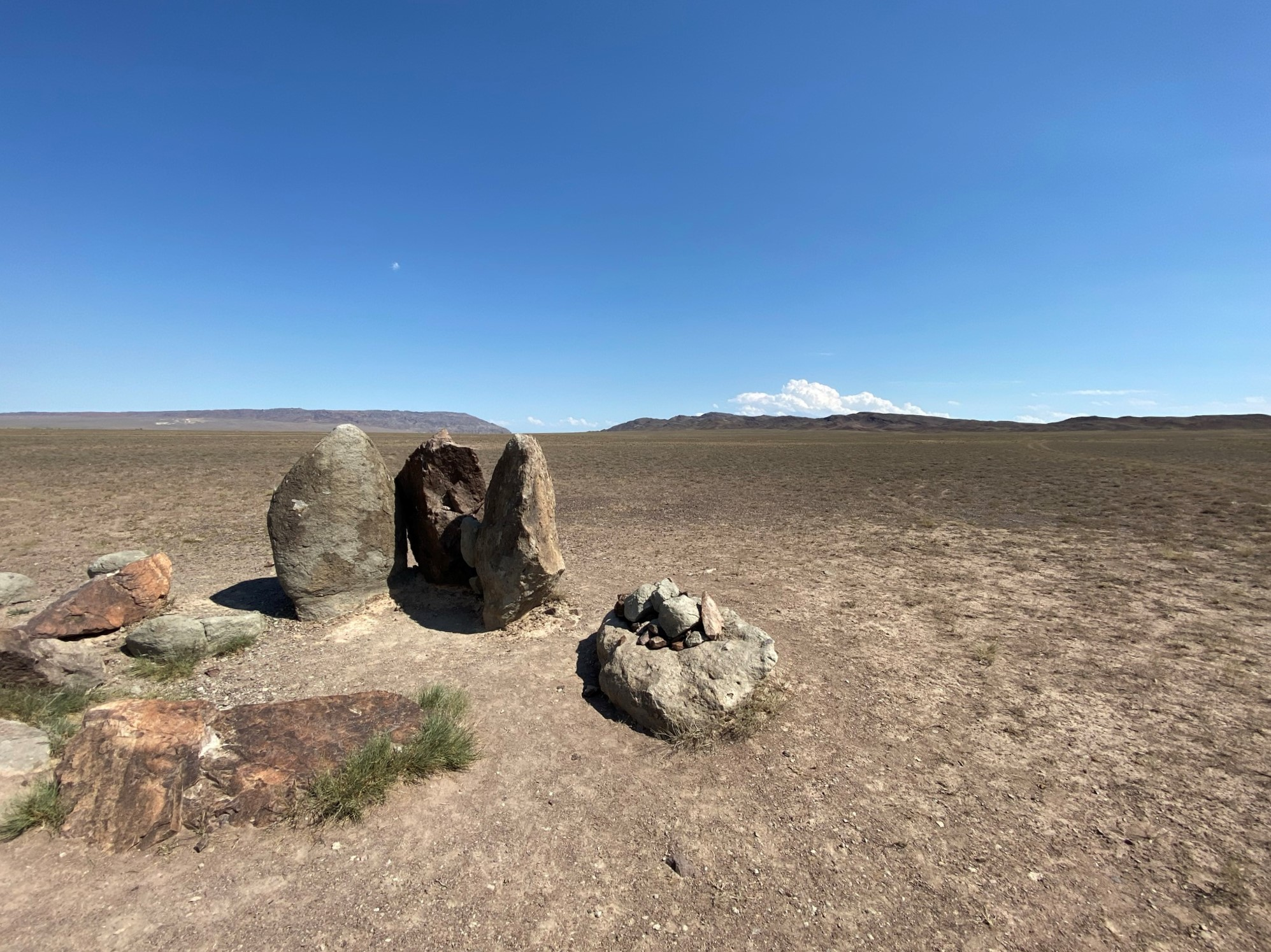
Stone steles Oshaktas

Altyn-Emel National Park is located in the Ili River Valley. It comprises various landscapes, including sand desert, mountains, and flora. The park was founded on 10 April 1996, with the objective to preserve a natural park complex, as well as archaeological and historical monuments. It is the largest reserve in Kazakhstan.

It consists of two main parts: the plain that adjoins the right Bank of the Ili river and the mountain, and the spurs of the Dzungarian Alatau and the macro-slope of the Altyn-Emel range. Small island mountain ranges are located on the plains. On the territory of the park, Carboniferous deposits (300 million years old) have been identified, which are mainly represented by volcanites, Permian and Carboniferous deposits, and the most ancient deposits are Silurian. The park's mountains are mostly composed of Paleozoic rocks that are 200 to 400 million years old.

Located within the park, the Besshatyr Burial Ground is a historical monument of Saka mounds. The burial mounds date back to the Iron Age, and were built by the nomads of the Central Asian steppes. Objects found within the burial mounds include gold-plated trappings, gold adornments and utensils, weapons and armor.

Another prominent feature of the area are the Aktau mountains, also referred to as the "lunar mountains" on account of their particular colors.

In May 2021, it was announced by the Kazakh Ministry of Ecology, Geology, and Natural Resources that the tourism in the Altyn-Emel National Park region will be developed with an emphasis on historical heritage as well as ecotourism.

In 2021, the Kazakh National Geographic Society announced that eco-toilets, gazebos, shade awnings, drinking fountains, and additional observation decks will be installed in the Altyn-Emel area in the near future.

== The Singing Dunes ==
The "Singing Dunes" are located 300 kilometers (190 mi) from Almaty National Park. The area is referred to as the Singing Dunes on account of the rumbling sound emitted from the sand. The Singing Barchan dune is 1.5 km (0.93 mi) long and 120 m (390 ft) high. The barchan is crescent-shaped. When the wind is blowing from the west dispersing the sands, it can sound as if a pipe organ is playing. The cause of this phenomenon is still a mystery, but scientists theorize that in hot dry weather the sand gets electrified due to friction and creates a certain sonic vibration.

== Climate and ecoregion ==
The climate of Altyn-Emel is Humid continental climate, warm summer (Köppen climate classification (Dfb)). This climate is characterised by large seasonal temperature differentials and a warm summer (at least four months averaging over 10 °C (50 °F), but no month averaging over 22 °C (72 °F)). The park is in the Tian Shan foothill arid steppe ecoregion.

== Flora and fauna ==
The park serves to preserve rare and endangered plant and animal species. The flora of the park includes 1,800 plant species, including 69 rare species. Also, 56 animal species within the park are considered rare, including argali, dziggetai, and Persian gazelle. Not counting insects and fish, at least 260 different animals live in Altyn-Emel. There are endangered amphibians including the Siberian toad and rare and endangered birds including black stork and imperial eagle. Of the 78 species of mammals, 11 are recorded in the Red Book of Kazakhstan, including stone marten, polecat, otter, manul (wild cat), wild ass, gazelle, argali, Asian barbastelle bat, Bukhara deer, lynx and Tien Shan brown bear. Kulan and Przewalski horses also live in the park. Among the flora, it is worth noting the ancient white and black saxaul, small groves of iron wood (Caucasian frame), and Sievers apple trees.

== Kosbastau oasis ==
The Kosbastau oasis, consisting of a grove of trees with a warm radon spring, is located in the plain between the Ulken-Kalkan Mountains in the west and the Katytau Mountains in the east. The exact age of the tree was revealed during the examination of the tree trunk, thick branches and roots. The willow was discovered during geological work in 1960. The monument is on the list of specially protected natural areas with the status of a nature protection and scientific institution, under the care of the administration of the Altyn-Emel National Park.
