= Issyk (river) =

River in Kazakhstan

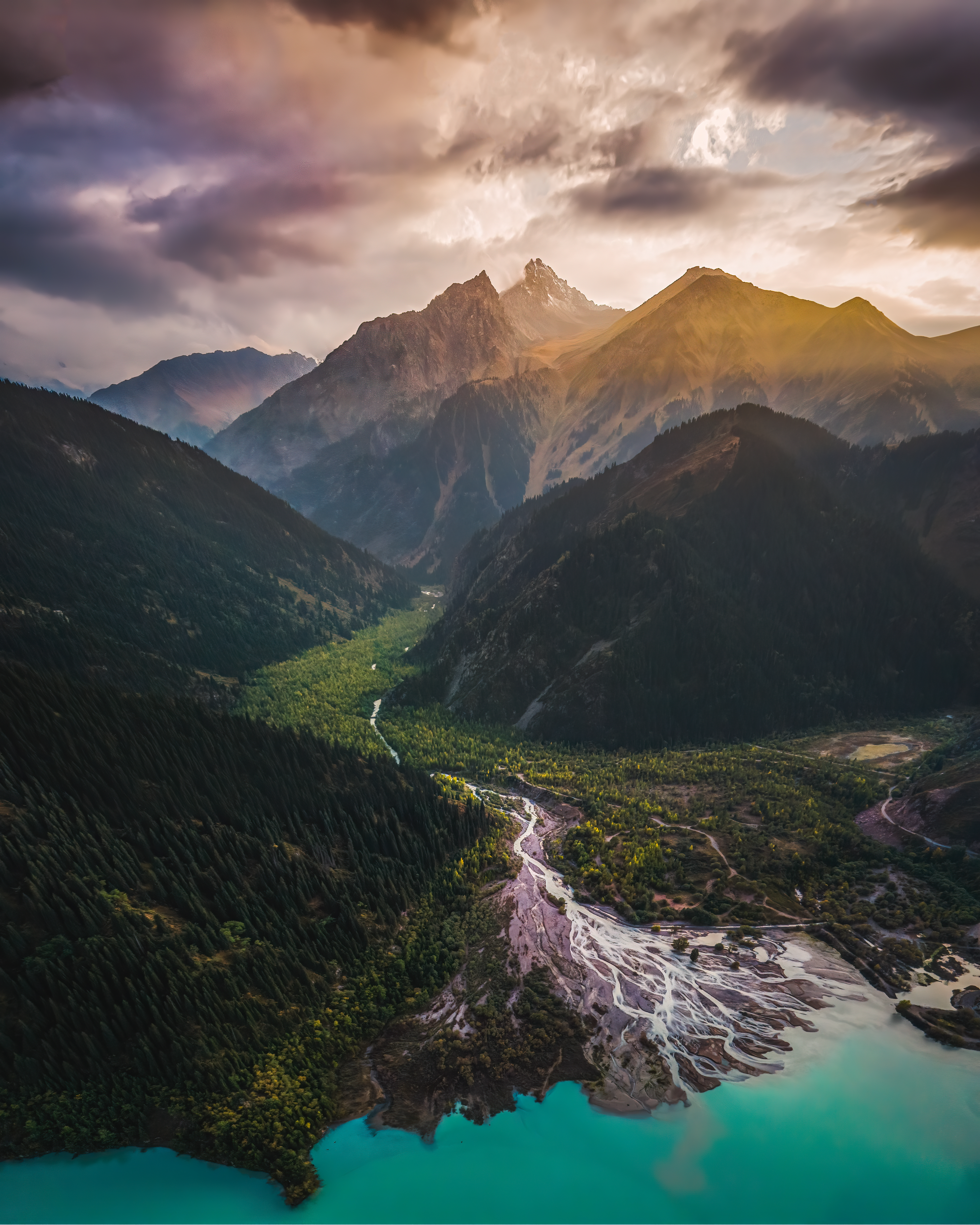
- The Issyk at Issyk Lake

Location
- Country: Kazakhstan

Physical characteristics
- Mouth: Ili
  - location: Kapchagay Reservoir
  - coordinates: 43.7602°N 77.3704°E

Basin features
- Progression: Ili→ Lake Balkhash

The Issyk (Kazakh: Есік, romanized: Esık, pronounced [(j)esɪ́k]) is a river in Kazakhstan that crosses the Issyk Lake and the town of Esik. It is a tributary of the river Ili. It is not to be confused with the Issyk Kul Lake in Kyrgyzstan.

One of the largest rivers on the northern slope of the Trans-Ili Alatau, its headwaters come from 32 active glaciers that cover an area of 43 square kilometres (17 mi^{2}). The largest glaciers are the Zharsai with an exposed length of 3.8 kilometres (2.4 mi) and an area of 6.37 square kilometres (2.46 mi^{2}), the Grigoriev with a length of 3.6 kilometres (2.2 mi) and an area of 5.86 square kilometres (2.26 mi^{2}), and the Pal'gov at 3.8 kilometres (2.4 mi) long with a surface of 6.95 square kilometres (2.68 mi^{2}). They descend from the crest of the main divide, which has an average absolute height of more than 4,000 metres (13,000 ft). Within the mountains the river is 22 kilometres (14 mi) long, the gradient of its longitudinal profile is 102 metres (335 ft) per kilometer, and the basin area is 210 square kilometres (81 mi^{2}).

In its upper reaches the river flows down a very steep slope (10-15°) over the deposits of a moraine overgrown with some vegetation and forms a deep (as much as 70 m) canyon; then, in front of the terminal vegetation-free moraine of the Pal'gov glacier, its longitudinal profile flattens out abruptly. Here the river forms numerous branches over an outwash plain. Below Lake Akkul' (its absolute elevation is 3,140 m), the longitudinal profile undergoes another sharp drop because of a large mountainous obstruction damming the lake and, perhaps, because of moraines buried under the obstruction.

In 1963, the overspill of Issyk Lake caused a large flood.
