= Peaks of Trans-Ili Alatau in Almaty region =

Mountains in Asia

The peaks and mountain passes of Trans-Ili Alatau bear the names of different explorers, cosmonauts, revolutionaries, pilots, statesmen, and other prominent figures. Namings also come from names of forms and reliefs - Trapezium, Window (Taschoky), Raw, Rocky, Stony, etc. The highest point of the Trans-Ili Alatau ridge is Talgar Peak - about 4,980 meters.

Some of the peaks and summits of Trans-Ili Alatau are Talgar Peak, Sergo Ordzhonikidze Peak, Youth Peak, Mayakovsky Peak, Antikainen Peak, Zoya Kosmodemyanskaya Peak, M. Mametova Peak, Big Alma Peak, Kumbel Peak, Titov Peak, Ozerny Peak, Khan-Tengri Peak, Tuyuksu Peak (Tuyuksu Glacier).

== List of peaks and summits ==
=== Antikainen peak ===
Located between the peaks of Otechestvennaya Voina and Manshuk Mametova. The peak was named after Toivo Antikainen, a Finnish politician, one of the organizers and leaders of the Communist Party of Finland. The peak is shaped like a pointed tower 4,000 meters high and rises 6–7 meters above the ridge. The Mametova Glacier slides down the northern slope of the ridge. July 7, 1940 a group of Almaty climbers led by I. Mezdrikov climbed the peak for the first time.

=== Kumbel summit ===
Kumbel peak is located in the Kok-Zhailau tract. Kumbel translates as "sandy ridge, sandy pass, sandy back" or fine-rocky ridge from the Kazakh language. Kumbel peak is one of the eponymous hills of the ridge. The height of the peak is 3,280 meters. The ridge is covered with scree and there is almost no eternal snow. The ridge is clearly visible from anywhere in the city of Almaty, and climbing the mountain is not difficult.

=== Manshuk Mametova peak ===
Located in the main ridge of the Small Almaty spur between Antikainen Peak and eponymous mountain pass (3,750 m). The height of the peak is 4,144 meters. Named after Manshuk Mametova, the hero of the Great Patriotic War.

=== Mayakovskiy peak ===
Mayakovsky Peak is situated to the north of Ordzhonikidze Peak. The height of the peak is 4,208 meters. The peak is a piling up of rocky debris, while the peak itself is staring upwards as a single monolith. The pioneers of the main route were a group of instructors of the Tuyuksu mountaineering camp led by E. Alekseyev and V. Senokosov in 1940.

=== Talgar Peak ===
Main peak of the Trans-Ili Alatau ridge. It has a powerful mountain massif with a trapezoidal shape. The massif consists of 3 unexpressed dome-shaped peaks. Location between South and North Talgar occupies the main talgar. The peak has a high level of complexity.

=== Big Almaty Peak ===
Located in the mountain spur of the Almaty-Alagir massif to the North of the Tourist peak. To the East of the peak is located Big Almaty Lake. The height of the peak is 3680 meters and it's shaped like a pyramid.
