= The Ancient Settlement Talhiz (Talgar) =

Coordinates: 43°16′43.5″N 77°13′24″E

- Traditional Chinese: 塔爾加爾遺址
- Simplified Chinese: 塔尔加尔遗址
Transcriptions

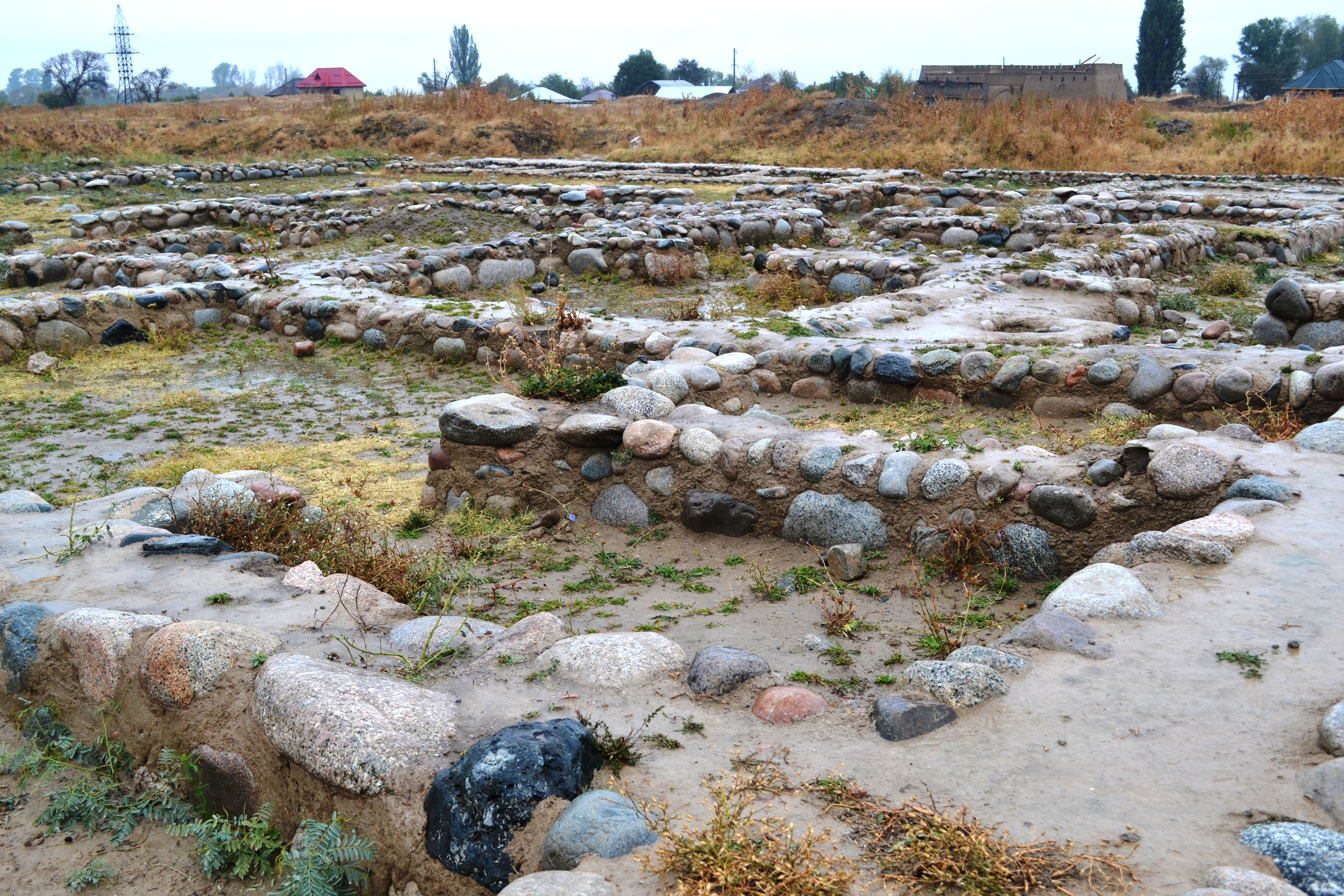

The Ancient Settlement at Talkhiz is included in the UNESCO World Heritage list, as it is the medieval settlement through which the Great silk road once passed. The city was formed in the 8th century and reached its development by the 13th century. Near the settlement there are endless steppes, fields and picturesque Zhailau, as the local population was engaged in grain cultivation and Handicrafts. On the other side, a panorama of the mountains of the Trans-Ili_Alatau opens.

== History ==
According to some statements – the word Talhiz is certainly very ancient, it is well distinguished by its second part "Gar", which goes back to the Indo- European languages and means "mountain". The city, classified as a major one, was first mentioned in the geographical register "Khudad al-Alem" (" Borders of the world"), compiled in the 10th century. Artifacts found in Talhiz, the trade and craft centers of the Iliisk valley, confirm that it was a medieval center of trade that had links to China, Iran, India and Japan via the silk road.

== See also ==
- The list of world heritage of Kazakhstan
- Talgar city
