= Kairak falls =

Natural waterfall in Kazakhstan

Coordinates: 43°11′9.3″N 77°44′0.1″E

Kairak
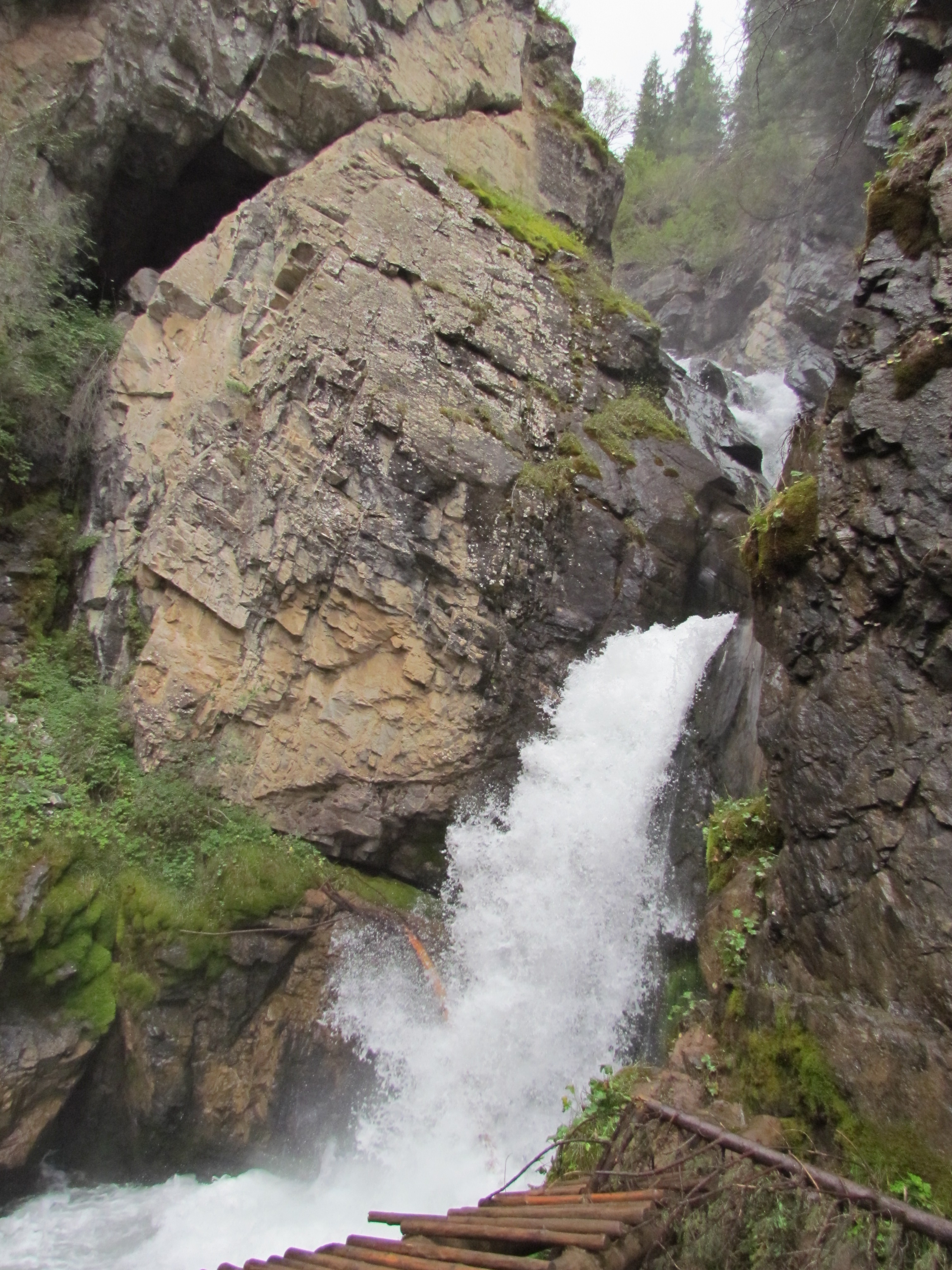
- Location: Almaty Region, Kazakhstan
- Total height: 55 m (180 ft)

Kairak Falls is a waterfall on the Kairak River in the Enbekshikazakh District in the south of Almaty Region of Kazakhstan on the right tributary of the Turgen River. The source of the river is located in the glaciers of the central part of the Zailiysky Alatau ridge (ili Alatau, Ileysky Alatau), near the border of Enbekshikazakh and Talgar districts of Almaty region. It flows through the territory of the Ile-Alatau National Park, the prevailing direction of flow is north — northwest. Approximately about ten thousand years ago, the right tributary of the Turgen Bozgul river broke through a tunnel in the rocks, thereby forming the most powerful and unique waterfall in the T-ili Alatau. The Kairak waterfall is located on the northern slope of the Zailiysky Alatau mountain range in the OI-Karagay tract. The waterfall is located at an altitude of 2,130 m (6,990 ft) above sea level. The height of the water fall is about 55 m (180 ft), with thresholds 74 m (243 ft). The height exceeds the famous Niagara Falls in North America at 53 m (174 ft) The waterfall got its name not by chance. Kairak-translated from the Kazakh language-is a "sharpener", it literally cut its way into the gorge.

== Protection of objects ==
The territory of the park is included in a specially protected natural area with the status of a nature conservation and scientific institution. Protection of the object is entrusted to the administration of the state natural Park of Ile - Alatau.
