= Monakhov gorge =

Canyon found in Kazakhstan

Monakhov Gorge (Kazakh: Монахов шатқалы, translating to English as Monk's Gorge) is a canyon located in Kazakhstan. The name is traditionally associated with Orthodox Christian monks who, according to locals, took refuge in the area during the early Soviet period. Today, a shallow corridor and a wooden cross mark the entrance to the site thought to be the location of the former cave complex.

== Description ==
The Monakhov Gorge is located within the Almaty State Reserve in the Trans-Ili Alatau mountains. The gorge merges with the Right Talgar Gorge at an altitude of approximately 1400 m (4593 ft.). It is characterized by steep rock walls, caves, and waterfalls.

The Monashka River flows through the gorge, and its water is generally regarded as safe for drinking. A hiking path runs alongside the river through the gorge and ends at a two-tiered waterfall.

== Cultural significance ==
The Monakhov Gorge is recognized locally as a site of cultural interest and is among the more frequently visited areas in the reserve. Visitor appeal is attributed to its natural landscape and association with religious history, particularly the remains of the wooden cross.
