= Almaty State Reserve =

Protected area in Almaty, Kazakhstan

- IUCN category Ia (strict nature reserve)
- Location within Kazakhstan
- Location: Almaty Region
- Nearest city: Almaty, Kazakhstan
- Coordinates: 43°6′49.824″N 76°54′32.652″E
- Area: 177,000 acres (720 km^{2})
- Established: 1961
- Governing body: Ministry of Ecology, Geology and Natural Resources

Almaty State Natural Reserve (Note: Kazakh: Алматы мемлекеттік табиғи қорығы, romanized: Almaty memlekettık tabiği qoryğy) is a 71,700 ha (177,000-acre) nature reserve in the Almaty Region, Kazakhstan, in the central part of the Trans-Ili Alatau ridge. In 1966, the Singing Mountain desert area (now located within the territory of the Altyn-Emel National Park) was added to the reserve, but in January 1983 the natural monument was placed under the jurisdiction of the Kapchagai Hunting Sector.

== Altitude belts ==
There are four high-altitude zones in the reserve:

- deciduous forests with wild apple, apricot, aspen and mountain ash grow in the forest-steppe up to a height of 1,600 metres (5,200 ft);
- from 1,600 to 2,800 metres (5,200 to 9,200 ft) – coniferous forests of Shrenk spruce and Tien Shan spruce;
- higher there are alpine meadows with creeping juniper;
- above 3,500 metres (11,500 ft) – bare rocks and glaciers.

== Flora and fauna ==
In the reserve, the following fauna are common: in the Ili River valley – argali, gazelle, keklik, pheasant; in the mountains – maral, roe deer, brown bear, lynx, snow leopard, black grouse, mountain partridge, bearded partridge, Himalayan snowcock, bluebird, juniper grosbeak, woodpecker, nutcracker.

The reserve is home to over 1,300 plant species, including 112 species of trees and shrubs.

== Mountains and glaciers ==
The highest point is Talgar peak (4,973 m; 16,316 ft) within the Talgar massif, which is a powerful center of glaciation.

Peaks-giants stand out with a special harsh beauty: Bogatyr (N-4626), Corp (N-4631), Aktau (N-4686), Metallurg (N-4600). The impressive Talgar peak (H-4973) is the highest point of the entire ridge, well distinguishable from the foothill plain for many tens of kilometers. The peaks, "headed" by the Talgar peak, form a powerful Talgar knot, which occupies the entire middle part of the reserve. This is one of the centers of the modern glaciation of the Trans-Ili Alatau; the largest glaciers of the Northern Tien Shan are concentrated here: the Korzhenevskiy glacier and the Bogatyr glacier. The first is 11 km (6.8 mi) long and has an area of 38 km^{2} (15 sq mi). The second is slightly inferior to it: length – 9.1 km (5.7 mi), area – 30.3 km^{2} (11.7 sq mi). The glaciers of Shokalsky, Grigoriev, Kassin, Palgov, Kalesnik and others are almost as extensive. The unique Talgar mountain knot is widely known among the country's climbers. For more than 40 years the alpine camp of the union significance "Talgar" has been operating here. In 1979, it was destroyed by a mudflow. In the upper reaches of the Issyk gorge, there are two high-mountain moraine lakes – Ak-Kol (White), which lies at an altitude of 3,140 m (10,300 ft), and Muz-Kol (Ice) at 3,400 m (11,200 ft). Glaciers sparkle dazzlingly – Zharsai, Palgova, Grigoriev, etc. The Talgar section includes three gorges – Left, Right and Middle Talgars. The longest of them – the Left Talgar (more than 30 km; 19 mi) – has, like most others, a direction from south to north. On the southern slope of the Trans-Ili Alatau there are protected gorges of South-Eastern Talgar, Southern Issyk and a number of other smaller gorges (Gubar, Kosbulak, Tamchi). In total, there are 160 glaciers in the reserve (with a total area of 233.7 km^{2}; 90.2 sq mi) out of 466 known in the Trans-Ili Alatau.

== Rivers and lakes ==
The river network is well developed. On the bottom of most gorges, there are rather turbulent rivers 5 to 7 metres (16 to 23 ft) wide and up to 1 metre (3 ft 3 in) deep; many keys. In the northern part of the territory, the largest (from 16 to 28 km; 9.9 to 17.4 mi long) rivers are Issyk, Left Talgar, Right Talgar and Middle Talgar. In the southern part, the Southeast Talgar (13 km; 8.1 mi), which originates from the Bogatyr glacier, and the South Issyk (10 km; 6.2 mi) flowing into it, flowing from the Korzhenevsky glacier, stand out noticeably. Both rivers are very deep, especially during the warm season. Southeast Talgar and Zhangyryk, merging, give rise to the river. Chilik is the largest in the Northern Tien Shan. Chilik (10 to 12 km; 6.2 to 7.5 mi) runs along the border of the reserve. The rivers are fed mainly by the seasonal melting of snow, firn fields and glaciers. The flood period begins in April and lasts throughout the spring and summer. The water discharge reaches 12 to 15 m/s (39 to 49 ft/s) and more in July – August. On some hot days, as well as after heavy rains, the rivers turn into roaring frenzied streams, destroying the banks and carrying large stones, gravel and sand. In winter, the rivers are shallow, do not freeze, but they form powerful ice on bends and bends, and in narrow places – arched cornices of ice and snow between the banks. There are almost three dozen small (from 0.1 to 3.8 ha; 0.25 to 9.39 acres) alpine moraine and glacial lakes in the reserve. All of them lie in the beds of temporary streams and feed mainly on melt water. These lakes are usually very deep and accumulate significant amounts of water.

== See also ==
- Peaks of Trans-Ili Alatau in Almaty region
