= Kaskelen gorge =

River gorge in Kazakhstan

Coordinates: 43°0′14″N 76°37′14″E

The Kaskelen gorge or Kaskelenskoye gorge is a protected natural monument situated on the Kaskelen river in Kazakhstan. The gorge is located 25km from the western boundary of the city of Almaty and sits in the Trans-Ili Alatau mountain system in Ile-Alatau National Park, Kazakhstan.

== Notable features ==
The gorge is known for 'Yurt', a large stone located on the ridge. A glacial erratic, the boulder is 5 meters high, 6 meters across, and weighs over 500 tons. This vast boulder is formed of the monolithic grey granite block without a crack.

Beyond the Kaskelen gorge, the Trans-Ili Alatau mountains run west for another hundred kilometers, after which the mountains become lower and the climate drier.

== Protection of the monument ==
The natural monument is included in a protected area. Protection of the monument is assigned to the administration of the Ile-Alatau National Park.

== Sources ==
- M. Zh. Zhandaev Nature Of The TRANS-Ili Alatau. ed. «Kazakhstan».- Alma-ATA, 1978
- V. N. Vukolov On the Northern Tien Shan. Ed. "Profizdat" M:, 1991
- A. P. Gorbunov Mountains Of Central Asia. Explanatory dictionary of geographical names and terms. Almaty, 2006
