= Talgar District =

Talğar
- District
- Талғар ауданы
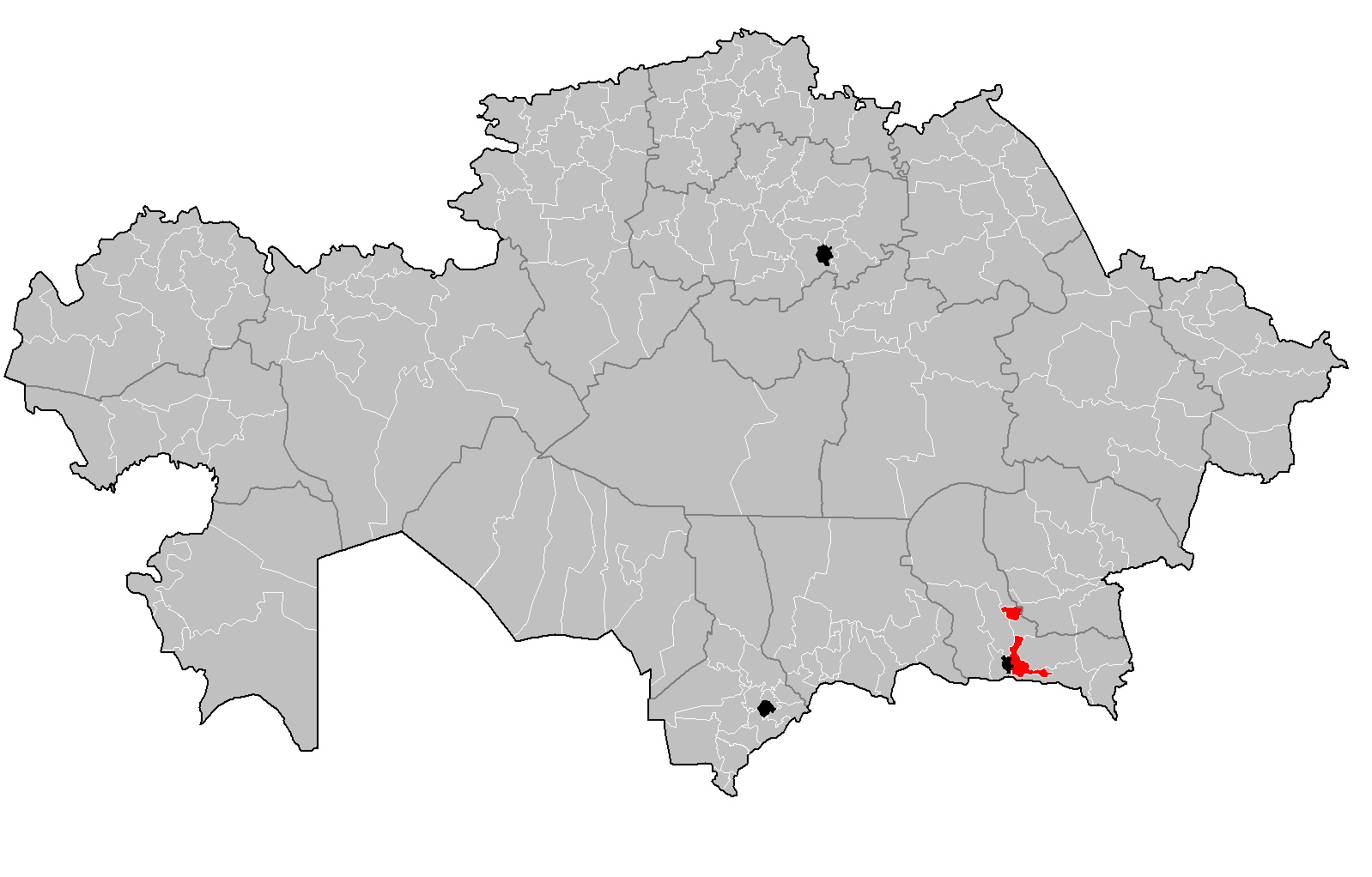
- Coordinates: 43°18′55″N 77°14′35″E
- Country: Kazakhstan
- Region: Almaty Region
- Administrative center: Talgar
- Founded: 1969

Government
  - Akim: Tanat Aidarbekov

Area
  - Total: 1,400 sq mi (3,700 km^{2})

Population (2013)
  - Total: 184,834
- Time zone: UTC+6 (East)

Talğar District (Kazakh: Талғар ауданы, Talğar audany) is a district of Almaty Region in Kazakhstan. The administrative center of the district is the eponymous town of Talǵar. It consists of an alluvial apron formed by the Talgar River, extending northwards from the glacier peaks of the Trans-Ili Alatau (topped by Talgar Peak, 4,973 m), an extension of the northern flanks of the Tien Shan Mountains. The district's population was 184,834 (2013 estimate); 170,221 (2009 census results); and 132,692 (1999 census results).

== List of settlements ==
- Beskainar
