= Birlik, Kazakhstan =

Birlik Бiрлiк
- Village
- Location in Kazakhstan
- Coordinates: 43°18′29″N 77°8′30″E
- Country: Kazakhstan
- Region: Almaty Region
- Elevation: 3,000 ft (900 m)
- Time zone: UTC+6 (Omsk Time)
- ZIP code: 040 308

Birlik (Kazakh: Бiрлiк, Bırlık) is a village (selo) in Talgar District of Almaty Region of south-eastern Kazakhstan.

== Geography ==
It is located several kilometres to the west of the district's administrative centre Talgar and several kilometres southeast of the former capital of Kazakhstan, Almaty. It is directly accessed via a road from Almaty to Talgar. The main road leads west and then forks off to the northwest, joining the A351 highway which leads to the Turksib District in the eastern suburbs of Almaty and the airport. To the south of the village, across the main road, the area is mountainous and climbs dramatically from the approximate elevation of 900 metres in Birlik village.

In 1987, the village was a part of Belbulaksy Selsoviet when the country was part of the Soviet Union.

== Economy ==
Industrial factories are located to the north of the village. Given its proximity to Almaty and good international connections through the nearby airport, Birlik is a developing settlement. In recent years there has been interest from investors, including an Indian firm looking to develop beer production facilities in Birlik.

In July 2003 it was reported that a Social Youth Service Centre was likely to open in Birlik as part of a scheme with Almaty Region to improve youth development. A conference was held in which the Almaty Youth Association presented a plan for developments in the Almaty area to tackle youth unemployment and drug abuse.

== Biology ==
Botanical studies were conducted in the Birlik area in August 1999. Calligonum turbineum (C4) seeds were collected from near Birlik and examined.
