= Kok Zhailau =

Kok Zhailau Көк Жайлау
- Plateau
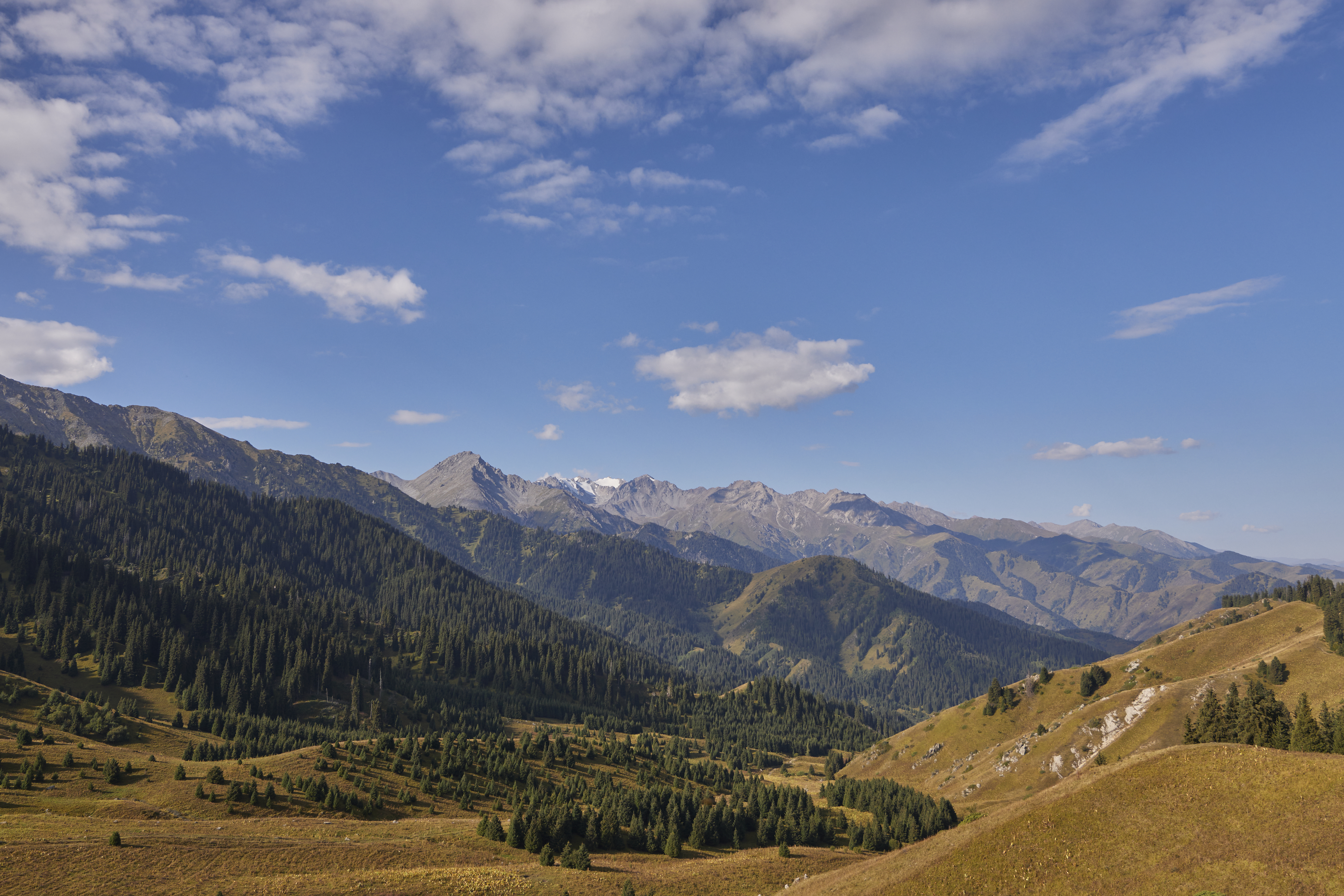
- Landscape of the plateau

- Location in Kazakhstan
- Coordinates: 43°8′34.231″N 77°0′14.364″E
- Location: Kazakhstan
- Part of: Trans-Ili Alatau, Tian Shan
- Elevation: 1,450 m (4,760 ft) to 1,740 m (5,710 ft)

Kok Zhailau (Kazakh: Көк Жайлау, romanized: Kök jailau, lit. 'Green Pasture', Russian: Кок Жайляу) is a plateau in the Trans-Ili Alatau. It is located at an altitude of 1,450 m (4,760 ft) to 1,740 m (5,710 ft) between the Small and Big Almaty gorges, 10 km from the city of Almaty (in Kazakhstan).

The plateau is part of the Ile-Alatau National Park, a protected area. Almaty, ski resort Shymbulak, Medeu and Big Almaty peak can be seen from the plateau.

== Flora and Fauna ==
There is a number of endangered species, insects and plants that inhabit the Kok-Zhailau plateau. These include 145 species of diurnal butterflies (Parnassius apollo, Tien-Shan apollo, Mountain Apollo, Karanasa dublitzkyi carnase, Karins dublitzkyi and others), 252 species of ground beetles, 110 species of bees, 97 species of burrowing wasps and 33 species of ants.

There are also 105 of birds in the area including the black stork, the eagle-dwarf, the golden eagle, the kumai, the shahin, the serpoklyuv, the eagle owl, the peregrine falcon and others.

Animals include the Tien Shan shrew, the red pika, the gray marmot, the Tien Shan mouse, the silver vole, the mountain goat, the roe deer, wild boar, foxes and squirrels.

Endangered animals include the Tien Shan brown bear, the stone marten, the Central Asian river otter, the manul, the Turkestan lynx, the Indian porcupine and the snow leopard.

The area includes tulips of Ostrovsky and Zinaida, Alatava saffron (Crocus alatavicus), as well as medicinal plants and spices (oregano, peppermint and others).

== Tourism ==
The Kok-Zhailau plateau is a popular tourist attraction. The area is accessible for hiking, biking, skiing, and horse riding. It is the only reachable area within the Ile-Alatau National Park.

The area is major tourist attraction on account of its unspoilt nature. Ecotourism is prevalent in the area. This also includes scientific ecotourism, cognitive ecotourism, blindwatching, botanical excursions, video and photo excursions, ethnic tourism and other activities.

To climb the Kok-Zhaylau is necessary to make an ascent on the Northern watershed of the gorge. This route is very popular due to the fact that during one day from the Kok-Zhailau plateau, you can make different hikes: 1) on the Terisbutak river, make a descent to The Big Almaty gorge– to the city along the "Observatorsky comb"; 2) along the Kamenskiy ridge to the health resort "AK Kain" through the Maloalmatinsky and Kamenskoye gorges, etc.

The key point that attracts European tourists to Kazakhstan, according to the opinion tourism professionals are pristine nature and its corners, which are similar to Ile Alatau national park. In recent years, ecotourism tourism has become famous all over the world, who pays little attention to the surrounding environment. There are hiking trails of various difficulty levels in the tract. There are places for camping. Information stands were installed with a description of the animals living here and information about rare plants. The end point of the trail to Kok Zhailau is considered to be a waterfall.

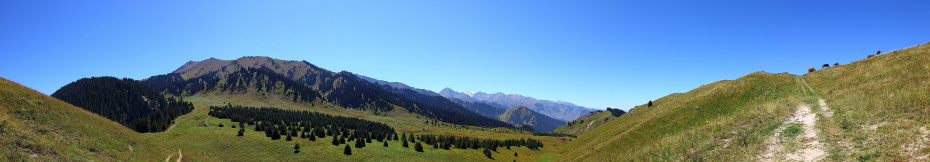
Kok Zhailau landscape.

== Controversy ==
The former president of the Republic of Kazakhstan, Nursultan Nazarbayev, gave way to build a major ski complex within the Ile-Alatau National Park. This will involve modifications to the Kok-Zhailau plateau and Kumbel mountains. The resort is scheduled to include ski runs, guesthouses and hotels. The region is considered as a protected natural reserve area and thus the project has caused controversy.

=== Ecological Impacts ===
Ecological concerns included air pollution due to dust and other emissions, like nitrogen oxide and sulphur along with soil erosion in the steep alpine terrain. Infrastructure such as roads and ski slopes would alter grazing and farmland, while causing a shortage of water used by local communities.

=== Water Usage ===
Water contamination by additives for artificial snow and melted run-offs, transferring pollutants into rivers and other water sources. Use of groundwater would cause long-term water shortages, called aquifer depletion. Disruption of lake levels and stream flows, would decrease already scarce drinking and irrigation water in Kok Zhailau's mountains.

=== Activism ===
Organizations such as the We’ll Protect Kok Zhailau have campaigned against public-private partnership projects (PPP) in natural protected areas such as Ile-Alatau National Park. Additionally, a Supreme Court decision in May 2023, as a result of lawsuits filed by The Green Salvation Organization, saw the creation of a buffer zone establishing stricter controls around the recreational usage of the park.

=== Recent News ===
In 2025, the Almaty Mountain Cluster plan was proposed, combining the Kok Zhailau Gorge and Mount Kumbel into a one large resort with other existing ones into the Almaty Superski, with 65 km of ski slopes and 16 ski lifts. It is projected to receive up to 7 and a ½ million tourists annually by 2029. However, the Ministry of Ecology had previously rejected the transfer of parts of Ile-Alatau National Park to the Almaty city government for the sake of protecting the park’s core and buffer zones.

=== WHC UNESCO ===
The UNESCO World Heritage Centre recommended that the leadership of Kazakhstan abandon the project to build a ski resort on the territory of the Ile-Alatau national natural Park. At the same time, the great importance of the development of eco-tourism and the nomination of protected areas in the UNESCO world natural heritage list indicate. The President of the UNESCO World Heritage Centre Mr. Kishor RAO, requests information from the Kazakh government regarding this project, but there is no answer yet.
