= Tuyuksu Glacier =

Glacier in Kazakhstan

Coordinates: 43°2′53″N 77°4′50″E

The Tuyuksu Glacier (Kazakh: Тұйықсу, romanized: Tūiyqsu, pronounced [tʊjʊqsú]) is a valley glacier in Kazakhstan. It located on the northern slope of the Zailiyskiy Alatau ridge, in the upper reaches of the Malaya Almatinka River, located from south to north at the foot of the eponymous mountain pass, in the center of a group of glaciers which form a horseshoe-shaped circus.

== Characteristics ==
The length of the open part is 3.5 km (2.2 mi), the width in the area of the circus is 1.5 km (0.93 mi), in the lower part (the glacier tongue) is 0.3–0.4 km (0.19–0.25 mi), the area of open ice is 3.1 km^{2} (1.2 sq mi). The average height of the snow line in the period 1973–1983 was 3,040 m (9,970 ft). The open end of the glacier descends to 3,400 m (11,200 ft). The thickness of Tuyuksu ice is on average 50 m (160 ft), with a maximum of 100 m (330 ft). The ice volume as of 1983 is about 150 million m^{3} (5.3 billion cu ft). The lateral moraines, connecting with the terminal moraine, created a giant rampart about 300 m (980 ft) high, which blocked the valley of the Malaya Almatinka River and made it difficult to access the glacier. A significant part of the glacier 1.4 km (0.87 mi) is located under this moraine. On average, the glacier shrinks (retreats) by 10 m (33 ft) per year, as a result, between the terminal moraine and the tongue of the glacier in summer, a significant lake is formed from melt water.

== Exploration ==
The Tuyuksu glacier was firstly discovered and described by Dmitriev S.E. in 1902. He was the first one to calculate the height of the snow line as 3,680 m (12,070 ft) above the sea level. V.D. Gorodetsky visited the area of Tuyuksu glacier in 1916 and photographed its central part, where the entire lower part of the glacier appeared as a powerful monolith without traces of surface contamination.

N.N. Palgov made expedition trips to the Tuyuksu area and the results of his observations confirmed the visual impressions which were compiled from the analysis of Gorodetsky's photographs from 1922 to 1926.

Two expeditions were led by G.R. Yunusov in 1937–1938. During the expeditions glaciers were plotted on the plan, conducting observations of glacier's melting and movement.

A seasonal weather station Tuyuksu-2 began operating in 1968, which carried out measurements of snow and ice ablation near the meteorological station.

In 1971 two wooden huts were built to continue year-round observations of the glacier. The set up of these huts significantly improved the living conditions of the glaciologists and had a positive impact on the process of observation and research.

In the early 1990s research almost ceased for lack of funding. However, the 2000s (decade) brought several foreign grants for research.

== Melting ==
From 1958 to the present day, Tuyuksu has lost about 57 million m^{3} (2 billion cu ft) of ice. If earlier it reached a length of 4 km (2.5 mi), now it is only 2 km (1.2 mi). The glacier is rapidly melting, as the air temperature in the mountains rises by an average of 2 °C (3.6 °F) annually. Scientists believe that the Tuyuksu glacier, which is of great importance for the whole of Central Asia, will cease to exist by 2050, and in this regard, an acute shortage of fresh water will begin in the region.
