= Big Almaty Lake =

- Ülken Almaty kölı (Kazakh)
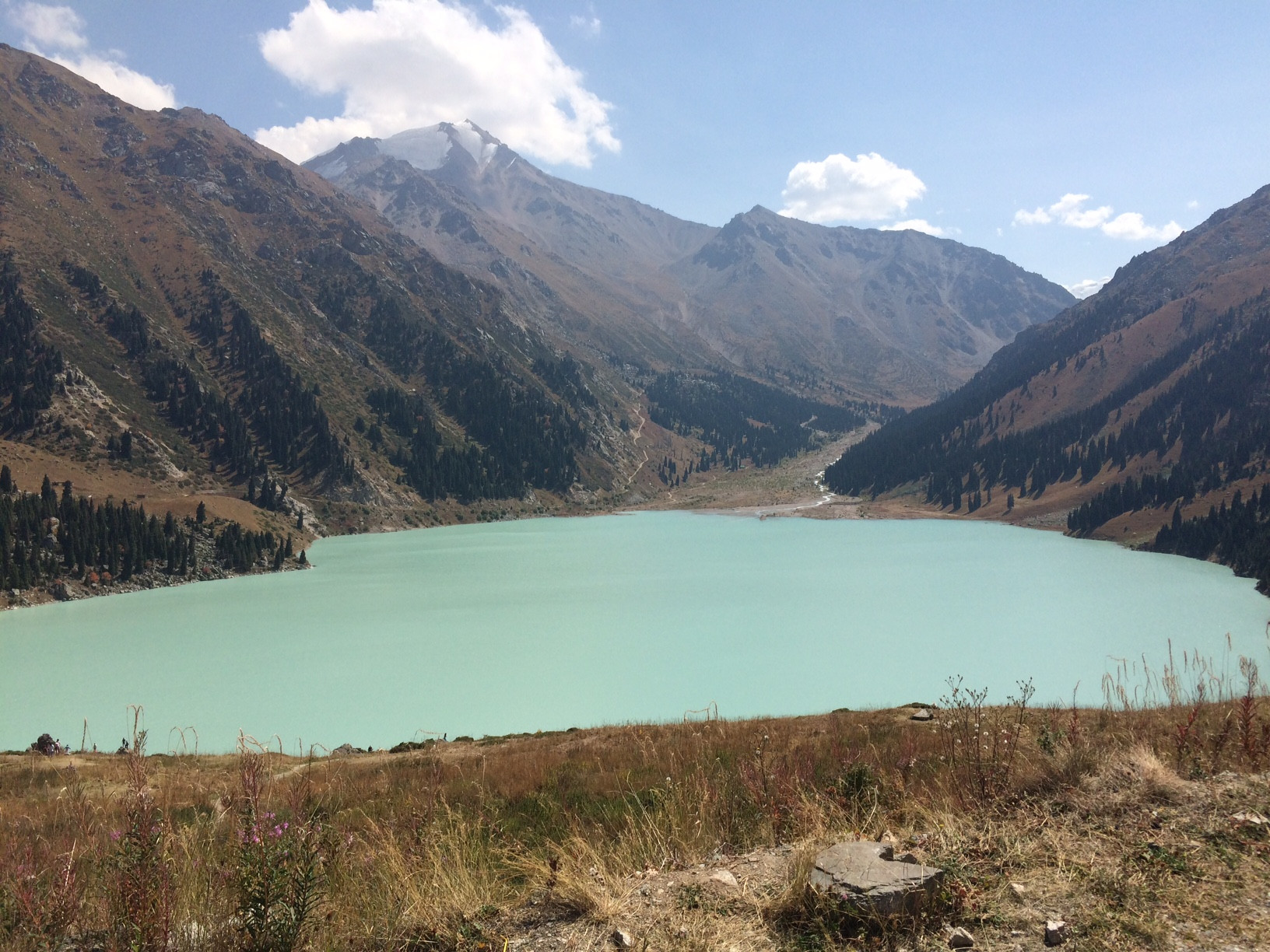

- Location within Kazakhstan Location within Asia
- Location: Kazakhstan
- Coordinates: 43.0506°N 76.9850°E
- Type: Lake
- River sources: Big Almaty river
- Max. length: 1.6 km (0.99 mi)
- Max. width: 0.75–1 km (0.47–0.62 mi)
- Settlements: Almaty

Big Almaty Lake (Kazakh: Үлкен Алматы көлі, romanized: Ülken Almaty kölı; Russian: Большое Алматинское Озеро) is a natural alpine reservoir. It is located in the Trans-Ili Alatau mountains, 15 km south from the center of Almaty in Kazakhstan. The lake is 2511 meters above sea level.

== Characteristics ==
The basin of the lake has tectonic origin with complex shape and general slope to the north. The lake is 1.6 km in length and from 0.75 to 1 km in width. The coastline is 3 km, the depth is 30–40 m, the volume of water mass is about 14000000 m^{3}. The maximum water level is in August, the minimum is in February. Level fluctuations reach 20 m. Lakeside is abrupt and steep.

From the south, the lake flows into the river Big Almaty. It is part of the Ile-Alatau National Park.

== Description ==
Like the vast majority of lakes in the Tien Shan mountains, the lake appeared as a result of a number of earthquakes. Above the lake rise the three main peaks that can be seen from the northern end of the dam: the peak of Councils (4,317 m) on the south-east, Ozerny (4,110 m) on the south and Tourist (3,954 m) on the south-west of the lake.

Big Almaty Lake is located at an altitude of 2511m on the upper side of the Almaty canyon. The Almaty River runs through it. It is located 2.511m above sea level. There are three peaks Sovetov (4,317 m), Ozyorny (4,110 m), and Turist (3,954 m) surrounding the lake, which can be seen from the northern end of the dam.

The lake is made up of glacial water and is 1.6 km long, 1 km wide, and approximately 40m deep. Turist, a 3,681m high pyramid, is the crest of Bolshoi Almaty Peak and is visible from the city center. The domed Tien Shan Astronomical Observatory is located higher up above the chalice of the lake (which is open to the public and includes tourist accommodation). The lake's high altitude location keeps the area at cool temperatures throughout the year. Depending on the time of year, the lake changes its color from light-green to turquoise-blue.

Since December 2012, the lake has become part of the administrative boundaries of the city of Almaty.

== Tourism ==
The lake is a major source of drinking water for the region. People can access the lake by car (approximately 1 hour drive from the city center), bike, or hiking (approximately a half-day trip). The lake is 15 km away from the city. Access to the lake requires payment of a fee to enter the national park (~450KZT in October 2019). The lake's average water temperature is 8-10 C, and swimming is prohibited as the lake is the main source of drinking water for Almaty.

== See also ==
- Sharyn Canyon
- Altyn-Emel National Park
- Tourism in Kazakhstan
