= Ile-Alatau National Park =

Protected area in Kazakhstan

Ile-Alatau State National Nature Park
- Іле Алатауы мемлекеттік ұлттық табиғи паркі (Kazakh); Иле-Алатауский государственный национальный природный парк (Russian)
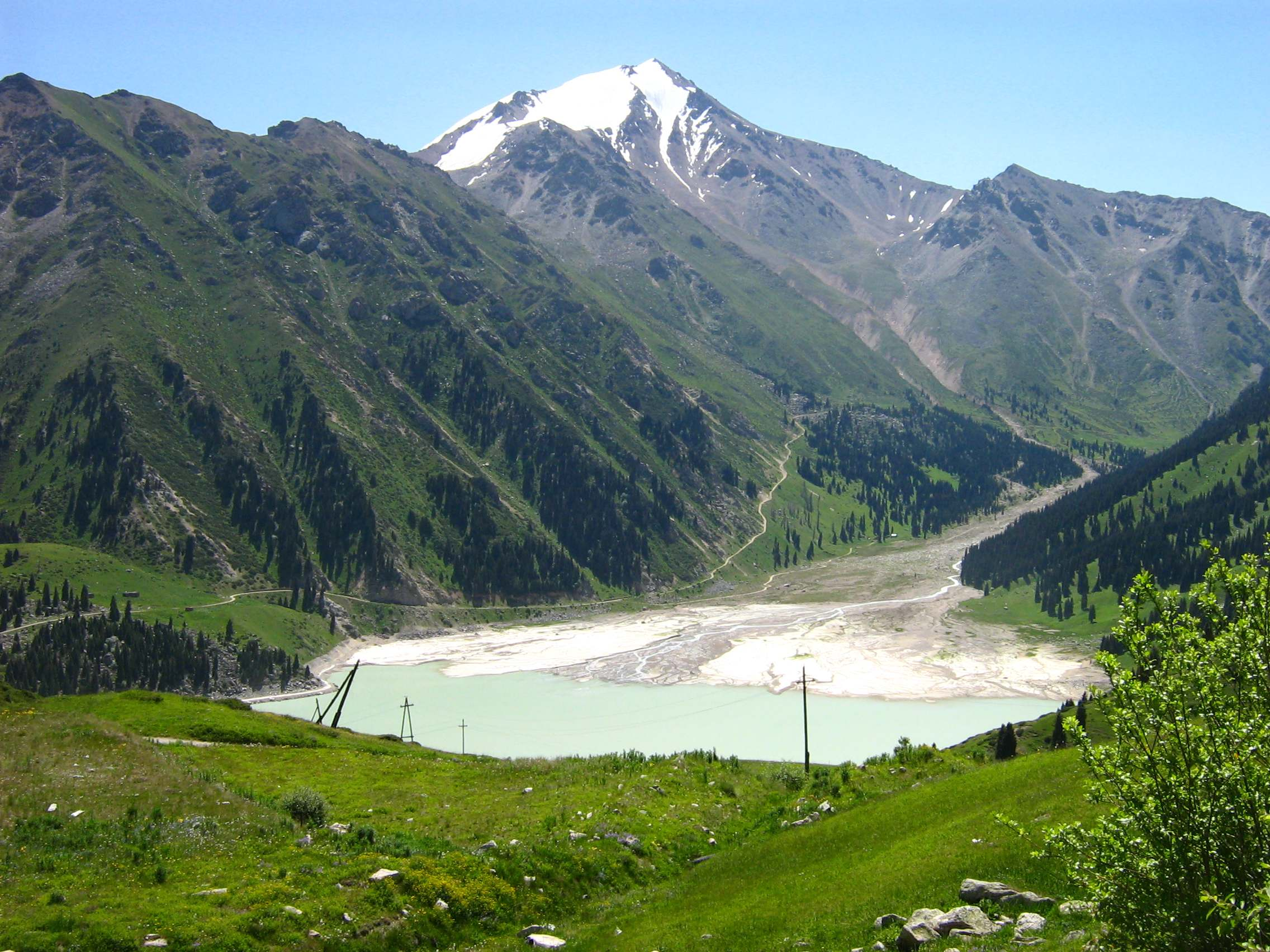
- View of Big Almaty Lake

- Location within Kazakhstan Location within West and Central Asia
- Location: Trans-Ili Alatau, Tian Shan
- Nearest city: Almaty, Kazakhstan
- Coordinates: 43°5′0″N 77°5′0″E
- Area: 200,000 ha (490,000 acres)
- Established: 1996

Ile-Alatau State National Nature Park (Note: Kazakh: Іле Алатауы мемлекеттік ұлттық табиғи паркі, romanized: Ile Alatauy memlekettık ūlttyq tabiği parkı; Russian: Иле-Алатауский государственный национальный природный парк, romanized: Ile-Alatauskij gosudarstvennyj nacionaljnyj prirodnyj park) is a national park in Kazakhstan, established in 1996. Covering an area of approximately 200,000 hectares, the park is situated in the Trans-Ili Alatau mountains, south of Almaty, and stretches between the Turgen gorge in the east and the Chemolgan river in the west. It borders the Almaty Nature Reserve, which encompasses the area around Pik Talgar.

The park's landscape includes woodlands, alpine meadows, glaciers, and lakes such as Big Almaty Lake. The flora of the park is equally varied, with tree species such as apricot, maple, and apple trees. The park is also home to an array of wildlife, with over 300 recorded species of birds and animals.

Ile-Alatau National Park is known for its biodiversity, with notable species including the snow leopards, Central Asian lynx, Tian Shan brown bears, Central Asian stone martens, Siberian ibexes, bearded vultures and golden eagles. It also provides habitat for several unique bird species, including the Himalayan snowcock, ibisbill, Eurasian scops owl, and Eurasian three-toed woodpecker. Furthermore, the park is home to species of deer, whose antlers are believed to possess medicinal properties.

== History ==
The history of the park begins with the creation of the Almaty State Reserve in Zailiisky Alatau in 1931. Initially it occupied an area of 15,000 hectares in the valley of Malaya Almatinka river, in 1935, after increasing the area to 40,000 hectares, and then to 856.7 thousand hectares, it became known as Alma-Ata, covering the whole Zailiisky Alatau ridge. Regular scientific research on vegetation cover, forest typology, birds and mammals began to be conducted in this territory.

The first scientific substantiation of the organization of the Zailiisky National Park was developed by order of the Council of Ministers of the Kazakh SSR on January 3, 1985, in accordance with the program of the Academy of Sciences "Development of Protected Areas in Kazakhstan". The scientific supervisors were academicians E. V. Gvozdev and B. A. Bykov.

In 1987, the Department of Biosphere and Ecology of the Kazakhstan Committee for the UNESCO program "Man and the Biosphere" at the Academy of Sciences of the Kazakh SSR within the program "Development of Protected Areas in Kazakhstan" prepared a scientific rationale for the "General Scheme of Development and Location of Natural Reserve Fund of the Kazakh SSR until 2005". This document proposed the creation of Zailiyskiy State National Nature Park on the area of 280 thousand hectares. According to this scheme, the creation of the park was planned for 1995. In 1990, a feasibility study for the organization of the park was developed. On February 22, 1996, the Ile-Alatau National Park was established on the territory of 202,292 ha by the governmental resolution.

== Climate ==
The climate in the national park is diverse and differentiated by altitude climatic zones. Summers are warm, winters are mild due to a pronounced inversion of air temperature. In the foothills, the average January temperature is -7.4°С, and 23°С in July. The duration of the frost-free period is 181 days, and 560 mm of precipitation falls per year. In the Maloalmatinsky gorge (Medeu tract), at an altitude of 1530 m, the temperature in January is -4.3 °C, and 18.1 °C in July. The duration of the frost-free period is 145 days, and 843 mm of precipitation falls per year. At an altitude of 3035 m (Mynzhilki tract), in conditions of eternal snow and glaciers, the average January temperature is −11.3°С, and 7°С in July. The duration of the frost-free period is 53 days, and 734 mm of precipitation falls annually. In the high-mountainous part of the Zailiyskiy Alatau at an altitude of 3750 m, the climate is harsh, and there is a lot of precipitation - 800–1300 mm, mainly in the form of snow. The warm period is very short - the average air temperature on the glaciers in summer does not exceed 2.8°С.

Snow cover according to long-term observations in the foothills (850 m) is established on December 6, in the middle mountains (1200–2500 m) - a month earlier, in the highlands (3000 m) - on October 21. In spring, snow melts at different heights and in different mountains from March 10 to May 22. The number of days with snow cover at different altitudes varies from 111 to 236. The height of the snow cover in the foothills is about 30 cm, in the middle and high mountains it can reach 100 cm.

The Zailiyskiy Alatau stands as a high forward barrier on the way of the northern and northwestern moisture-carrying air masses, which freely penetrate through the main valleys deep into the mountains, causing a clear differentiation of natural landscapes at altitude. The territory of the park covers low-mountain, mid-mountain and high-mountain landscapes, which reflect the layered structure of the mountains.

Climate data for Big Almaty Lake (1991–2020)
Month	Jan	Feb	Mar	Apr	May	Jun	Jul	Aug	Sep	Oct	Nov	Dec	Year
Mean daily maximum °C (°F)	−2.8 (27.0)	−1.5 (29.3)	2.5 (36.5)	6.7 (44.1)	10.5 (50.9)	14.1 (57.4)	16.2 (61.2)	15.8 (60.4)	12.3 (54.1)	7.5 (45.5)	2.7 (36.9)	−1.1 (30.0)	6.9 (44.4)
Daily mean °C (°F)	−8.3 (17.1)	−7.2 (19.0)	−2.9 (26.8)	2.1 (35.8)	6.1 (43.0)	9.9 (49.8)	12.0 (53.6)	11.4 (52.5)	7.5 (45.5)	2.4 (36.3)	−2.5 (27.5)	−6.4 (20.5)	2.0 (35.6)
Mean daily minimum °C (°F)	−12.4 (9.7)	−11.5 (11.3)	−7.1 (19.2)	−1.9 (28.6)	2.0 (35.6)	6.0 (42.8)	7.9 (46.2)	7.2 (45.0)	3.5 (38.3)	−1.3 (29.7)	−6.2 (20.8)	−10.2 (13.6)	−2.0 (28.4)
Average precipitation mm (inches)	26.0 (1.02)	31.9 (1.26)	50.8 (2.00)	103.9 (4.09)	138.7 (5.46)	135.5 (5.33)	122.0 (4.80)	72.8 (2.87)	43.7 (1.72)	48.3 (1.90)	45.1 (1.78)	36.7 (1.44)	855.4 (33.68)
Average precipitation days (≥ 1.0 mm)	6.2	6.3	9.4	12.2	14.5	15.2	13.8	9.5	6.6	7.5	7.2	6.6	115.0
Source: NOAA

== Flora ==
The flora of the natural park has more than 1,000 species, of which the overwhelming part accounts for the flora of the middle-mountain forest belt. There are more than 500 species of deciduous forests and more than 400 species of higher plants in spruce forests. 36 species are included in the Red Book.

In the lowlands there are Ostrovskiy tulip, Mushketov's curlicue, Alberta iris, Sivers apple tree, Altai holosemianus; in the middlelands - orange jaundice, Semenov's tufted shagreen, Alma mater, cortuza Semenova; in the highlands - Falconer liverwort, Tianshan Siberia, Kumbel hawk, Schmangauzia asteriata, Sossurea wrapped. The mosses listed in the Red Book, such as Pachyphysissidens largeifolia and Orthotrichum smoothened are in special need of protection. The red-listed saffron of Alatau (Crocus alatavicus) can be found in the Kok-Gailau tract.

From the set of useful plants of great interest is a group of fodder plants (more than 80 species): cobresia hairy, sedge narrow dense, fescue Krylov, bluegrass alpine and meadow bluegrass, fescue Tianshan, hedgehog, short-legged pinnate, species regeneration, clover, pea, chinna.

Among tannic plants, the most valuable are various species of sorrel, mountain pea, and rhubarb. From the essential oil-bearing plants - angelica, juniper, wormwood. As natural dyes can be used cuffs, daubing, macrotonia, etc.

Widespread medicinal plants: fir, yarrow, mother and stepmother, rose hips, joester, valerian, juniper, dandelion, plantain, etc.

Among the food plants are especially valuable: apricot, apple tree, raspberry, currant, strawberry, blackberry, barberry, sea buckthorn, rowanberry, hawthorn, rose hips.

Numerous ornamental plants: primroses, waterspouts, tulips, irises, small petals, bluebells, gentians, violets, different types of trees and shrubs.

== Fauna ==
The fauna of invertebrates has not been fully studied yet. However, by now more than 2000 species from 8 classes are already known.

The composition of some classes of insects has been partially revealed. Thus, from the order of beetles 252 species of beetles, 180 - staphylinids, 102 - leaf beetles; from the order of scaly or butterflies - 145 species of daytime moths; from the order of hymenoptera - 110 species of bees, 97 - swarming wasps, 33 - ants, and 30 ichneumon flies have been studied. Of all this diversity, only 24 species are included in the Red Book of Kazakhstan, including 3 species of mollusks (Bradybena senestrosa, Pseudonapeus shnitkova and Turcomylax cvetkova). The others belong to the class of insects: the Notable Hornbill, the Pretty Ladybird (order of dragonflies), the Short-winged Bolivaria (mantis), the Steppe Dabbit, the Semenov's Daisy, the Ershov's Jaundice, the Bedromylius, the Patrician.

The vertebrate fauna is represented by 245 species. In mountain rivers and streams there are 8 species of fish: naked and scaly ottomans, marinka, minnow, and in the river Turgen - acclimatized rainbow trout.

There are four species of amphibians, two of which (Danatin toad and Central Asian frog) are included in the Red Book of Kazakhstan.

Of the eight species of reptiles, lizards are common (Alai's googly and multicolored lizard), as well as snakes - common and water snake, multicolored and patterned snakes. More rare are venomous snakes - steppe viper and shield-monkey.

The variety of natural conditions determines the species richness of birds. In total, there are 178 species in the national park. According to the character of their stay they are divided into three groups: nesting - 105 species, arriving for wintering - 18 species, migrating - 55 species. The Red Book includes 11 species (black stork, pygmy eagle, golden eagle, kumai, shahin, sickle-owl, eagle owl, saker falcon - flying; peregrine falcon, and big lentil - wintering).

Mammals 48 species. Typical mountain mammals include the Tianshan rodent, rock squirrel, red pika, gray marmot, Tianshan mouse, silver vole, stone marten, snow leopard, and ibex.

Along with species typical of mountains, there are also species typical of other ecosystems in the park: wolf, fox, bear, roe deer, red deer, wild boar, tolai hare, etc. The group of red-listed species consists of 7 species: brown Tianshan bear, snow leopard, stone marten, Central Asian river otter, Pallas' cat, Turkestan lynx and Indian porcupine.

== Landmarks ==
On the territory of the park there are burial mounds of the early Iron Age on the Assy plateau and near the Turgen Gorge, Sak burials on the banks of the Issyk River.

On the right bank of the Turgen River the traces of a strong earthquake, which occurred here more than 10,000 years ago, were found. This debris strata in the form of rocks of bizarre shapes and various colors is a true monument of nature.

The relict mossy Chinturgen spruce forests are also a natural monument, where islands of permafrost with ice thickness of 2–3 m are preserved under the cover of moss at a depth of 30–40 cm. Permafrost massifs located at such a low altitude are not found anywhere else in the Trans-Ili Alatau. The high-altitude landscape, which resembles the cold desert of the Inner Tien Shan, which is located along the axial part of the ridge at the Pass of "Prokhodnoy", is unique.

Peak "Seven Needles Tuyuksu" is a peak consisting of seven rock formations, shaped like needles. The difficulty category is 4a.

The park also includes the Kaskelen river gorge.

== Gallery ==
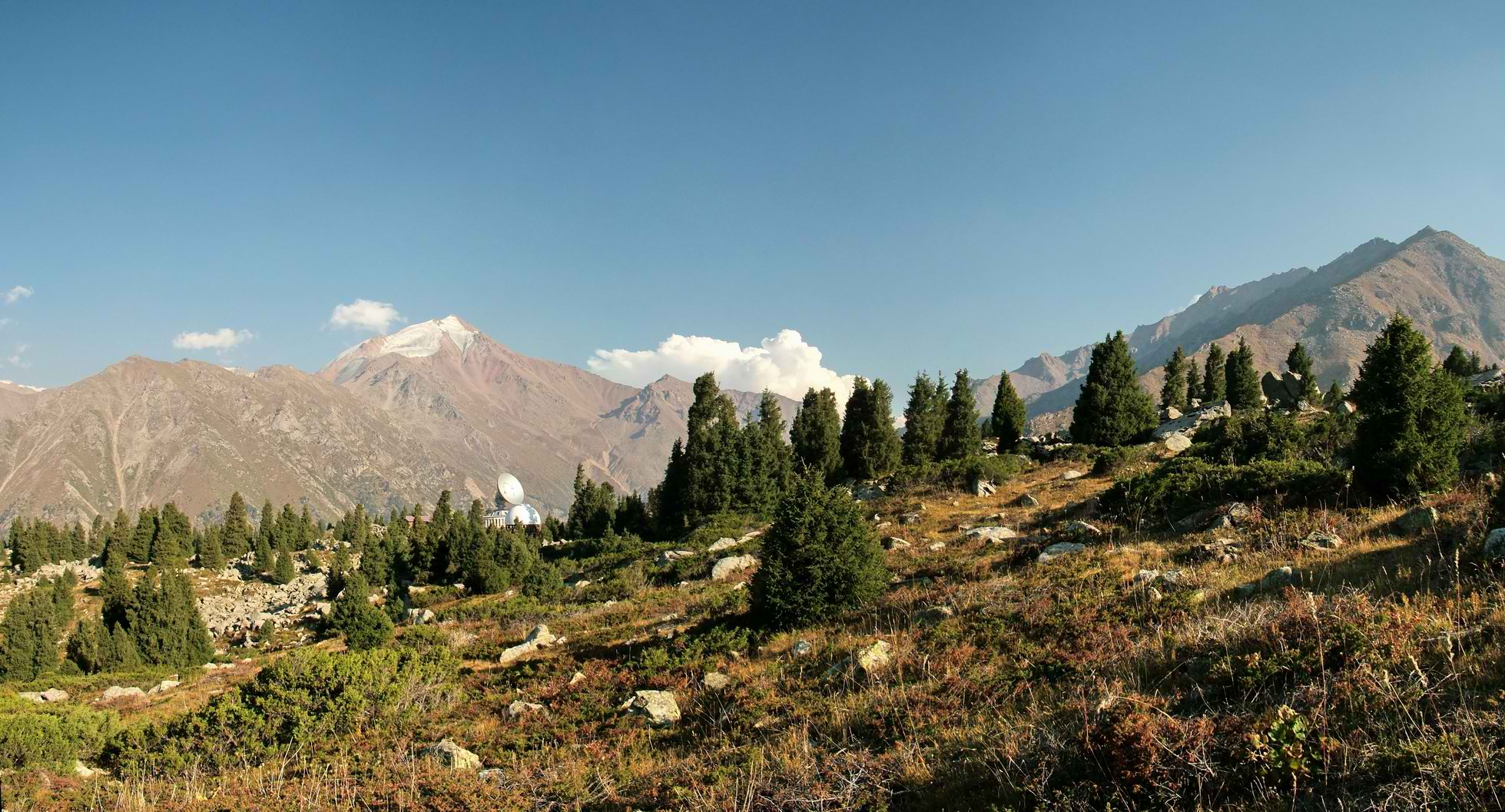
Near observatory.

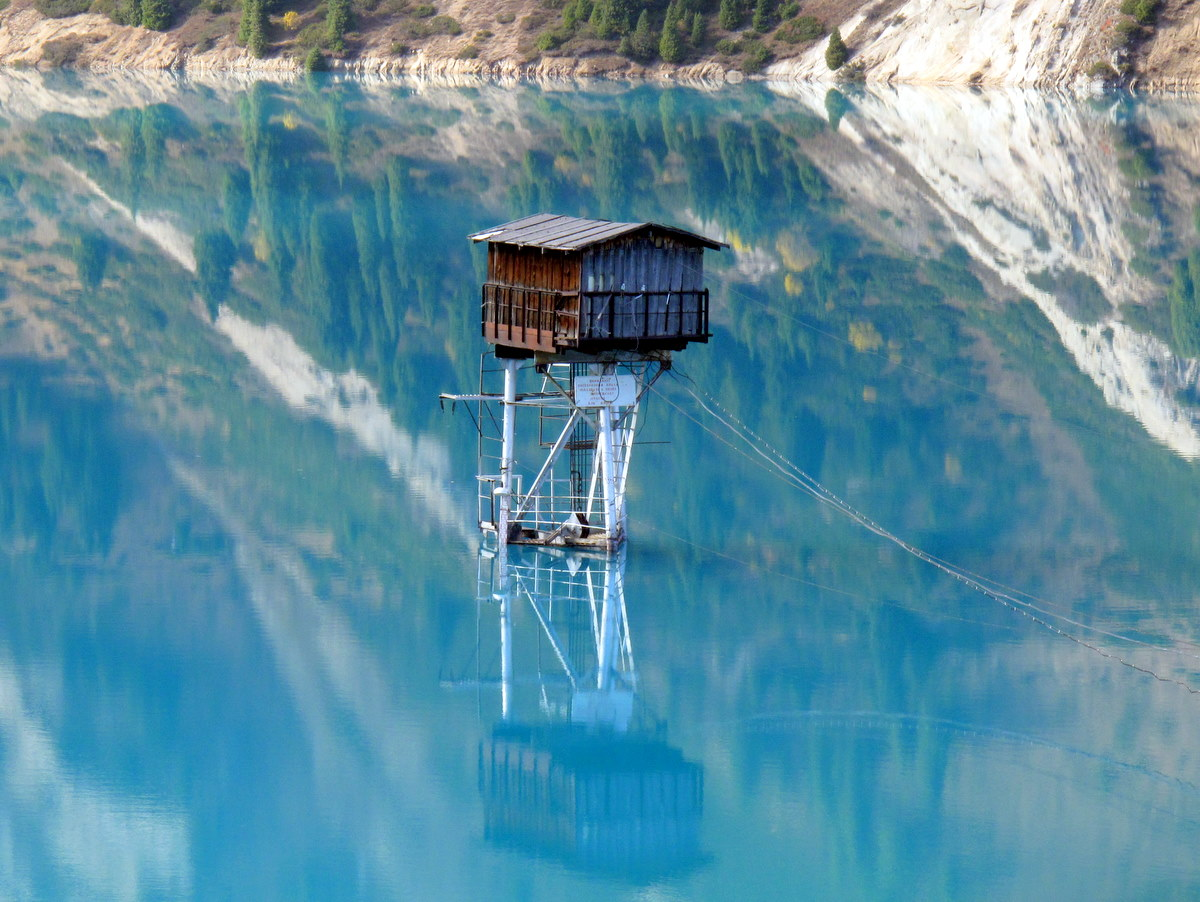
Watchtower in Big Almaty Lake.

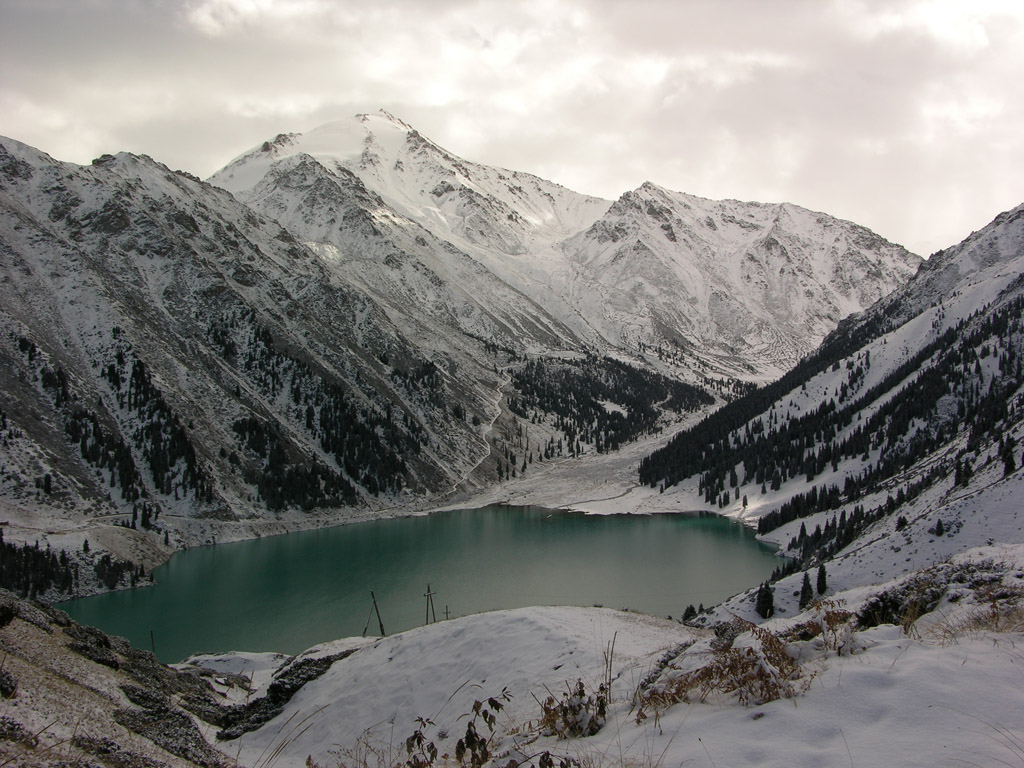
Lake in winter.

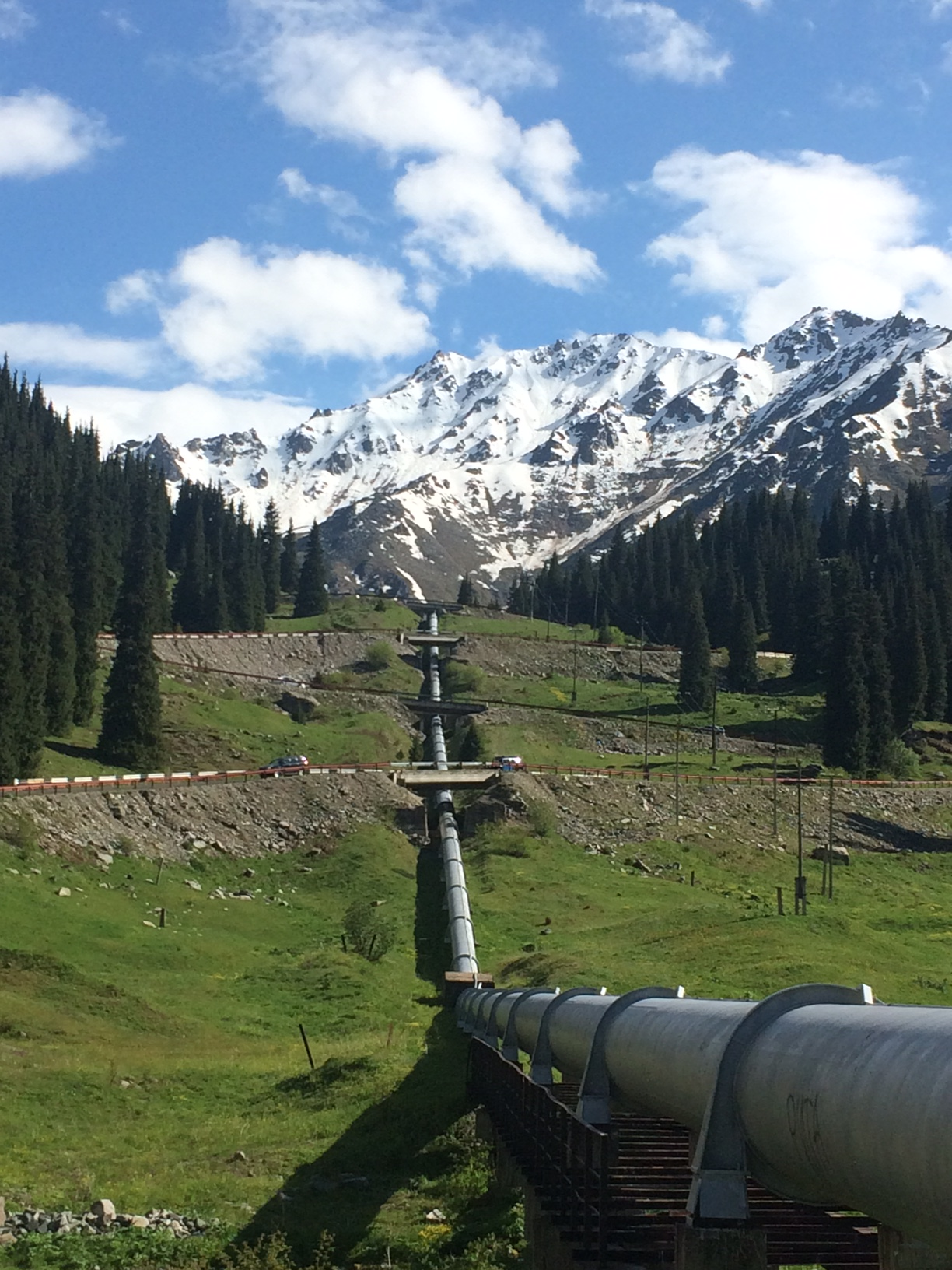
Water pipe from the lake.

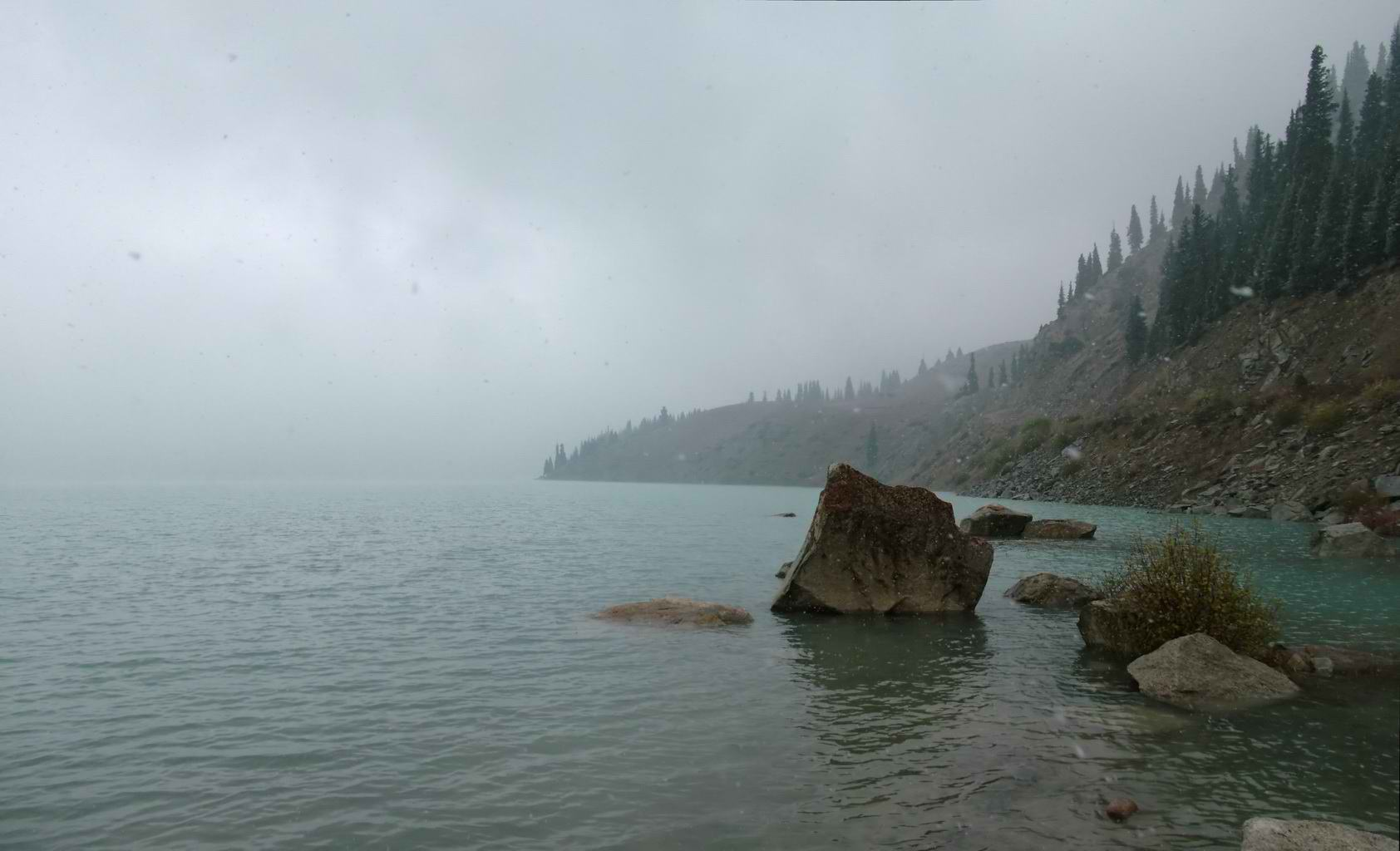
Lake during a fog.

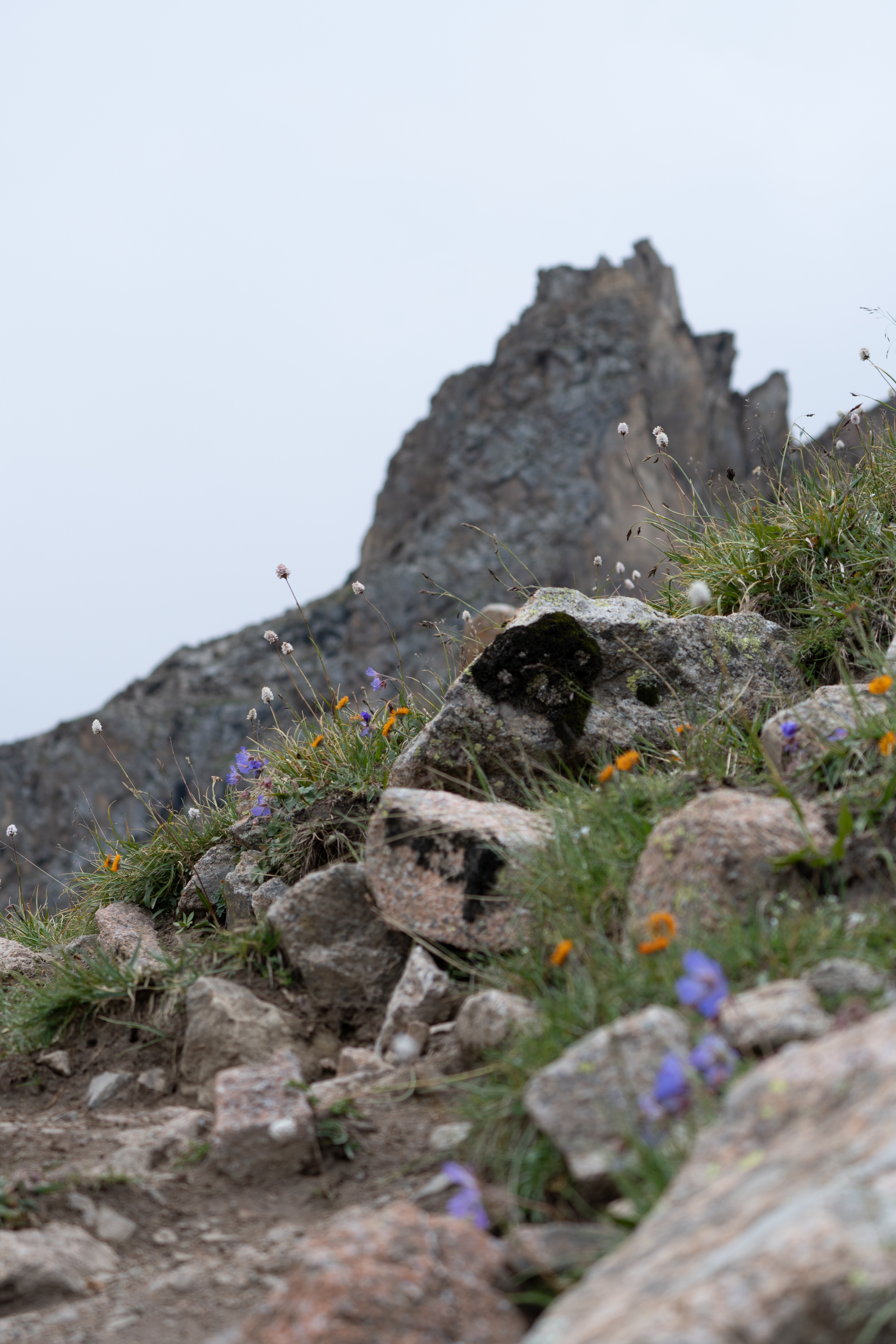
Wildflowers along the Bogdanovich Glacier trail.

== Panoramic view ==
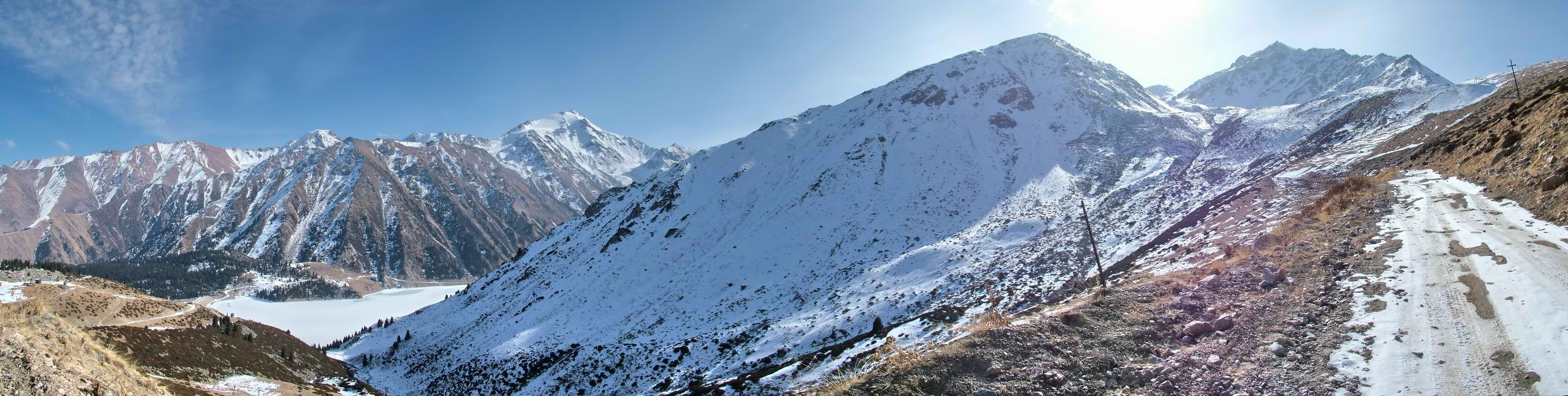
Winter time panoramic view of the park.
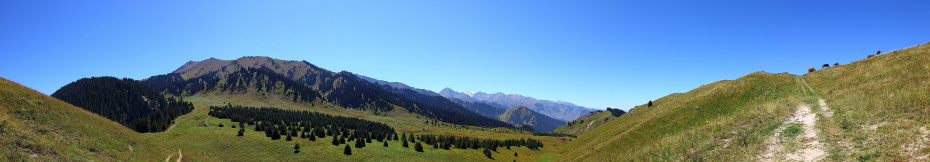
Kok Zhailau landscape.
