= Talgar =

Talgar Талғар
- town
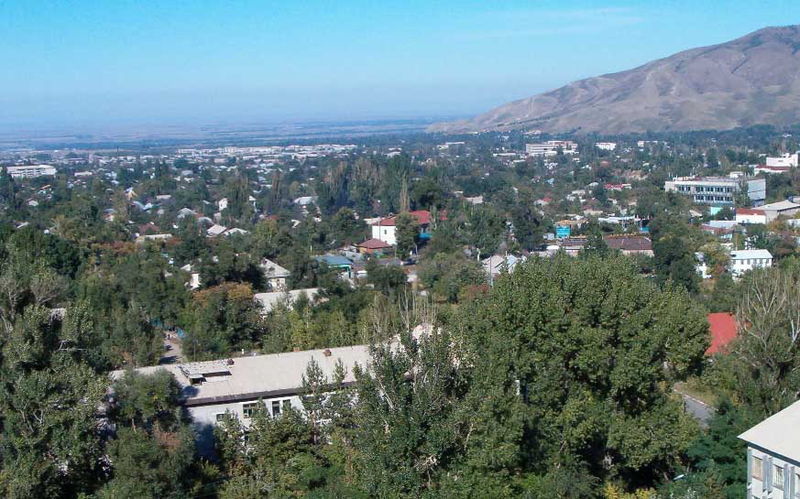

- Location in Kazakhstan
- Coordinates: 43°18′N 77°14′E
- Country: Kazakhstan
- Region: Almaty Region
- First settled: 900s
- Founded: 1858
- Incorporated (city): 1959

Government
  - Akim (mayor): Bakhyt Kurshibekov

Area
  - Total: 18.8 km^{2} (7.3 sq mi)
- Elevation: 1,000–1,500 m (3,300–4,900 ft)

Population (2021 census)
  - Total: 63,883
- Time zone: UTC+6 (UTC)
- Postal code: 041601-041605 (town)
- Area code: +7 72774
- Website: http://www.akimat-talgar.gov.kz

Talgar (Kazakh: Талғар, romanized: Talğar, pronounced [tɑlˈʁɑɾ]; Russian: Талгар) is a town in Almaty Region, southeastern Kazakhstan. It is the administrative center of Talgar District. The town is located between Almaty and Esik, 25 km from Almaty and several kilometres east of Birlik. Population: 45,529 (2009 census results); 43,353 (1999 census results).

== Etymology ==
There are several possible explanations for the town's name. The most obvious is that Talgar originates from a later modified name of an ancient settlement of Talkhiz, situated in the Talgar suburbs.

== History ==
=== Middle Ages ===
The first records of the Talgar settlement were made by a Persian geographer in a Persian medieval geographical treatise Hudud al-'Alam ("Borders of The World") in 982. The settlement bore the name Talkhiz and was situated in the mountains of Semirechye at the borders of Turkic tribes Karluk and Chigils. The geographer described inhabitants of Talkhiz as "brave, martial, and valiant people". Scientists analyzed the name of the settlement and concluded it to have been distorted by a copyist, so that originally it sounded as “Talkhir”. However, Talkhir (Talgar) is a well-known name in modern Kazakhstan. A town neighboring Almaty, a river flowing through it and the highest peak of Zailiisky Alatau also bear this name. It became obvious that the ancient settlement had been situated somewhere close by. Archeological excavations in the southeastern suburbs of modern Talgar revealed the mysterious settlement.

Thanks to the work of archeologists I.I. Kopylov, A.Kh. Morgulin, K.M. Baipakov, and T.V. Savelyeva the scenario of the development of Talgar settlement was reconstructed.

In the 9th century a fortification belonging to the head of a Turkic tribe was founded in Talgar settlement. The locality was chosen because it was on the Silk Road and situated at the foothills of Zailiisky Alatau, incorporating rich land sources and summer pastures.

With time, Talgar settlement became popular with merchants and craftspeople. First they served the owner of the settlement and his court, but later they started producing goods for nomads and surrounding settlements. Such city development was common in Central Asia at that time.

By the beginning of the 10th century, Talgar had become a city. It was a time of political and economic change in Kazakhstan history, since the country got controlled by the feudal Karakhanid dynasty. The territory of Kazakhstan was conditionally divided into several appanges governed by Karakhanid deputies. Talgar developed rapidly in this period and, like other cities of the Ili river valley it became the capital of an economically and geographically important territory.

=== 19th and 20th centuries ===
After a Cossack fortification, Vernoye, was established in February 1854 in nearby Almaty, the local government decided to further fortify the eastern border with the Russian Empire. Three stanitsas were founded close to Vernoye: Sofiiskaya (Talgar), Nadezhdinskaya (Issyk), and Lyubavinskaya (Kaskelen). According to a legend the stanitsas were named after the three daughters of a local governor.

First information concerning the founding of Sofiiskaya stanitsa was registered in February–March 1858 when Khorunzhy Zherebyatyev and 24 Siberian kazak families built several houses on the right bank of the Talgar river. “38090 dessiatinas of land for tillage and buildings and 2636 dessiatinas of neudobitsa (inarable land)” were apportioned for settlement of the stanitsa.

Stanitsa Sofiiskaya was renamed for Murayevo village in 1918 and for stanitsa Talgar in 1919. On 22 December 1959 Talgar received town status. The town was a center of the Iliisky District until 1969, and became a center of Talgar District in May, 1969.

== Geography ==
=== Topography ===
Talgar is located on the southern border of Almaty Region. Talgar's official geographic coordinates are 43°18′0″N 77°14′0″E. The town sits at the foot of Zailiisky Alatau which is a mountain range of Tian Shan and a part of the Himalayan orogenic belt. The town stretches along the river for approximately 6 km from the highest point in Meliorator microdistrict to the lowest point in Ken Dala.

Talgar has a total area of 18.8 square km (7.3 mi²). The grade of the town's built-up areas is consistent with the natural unevenness of its overall natural geography. The average land elevation is 1250 m above sea level. The lowest points are in the northern part of the town at 1000 m, while the highest points at 1500 m are located in the town's south side.

=== Talgar Mountains ===
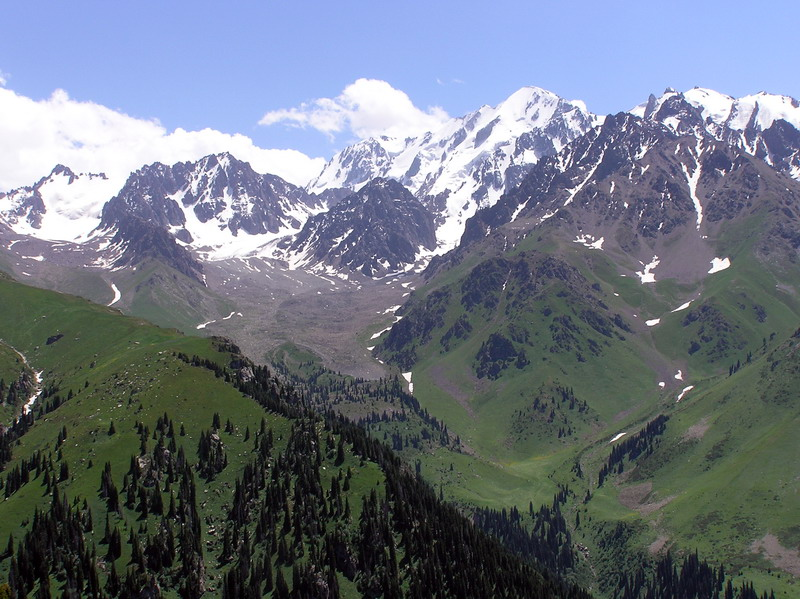
Talgar mountains. Kamennoye ravine

Talgar mountains is an informal name for a north-western part of Zailiisky Alatau adjacent to the town. The Talgar mountains are a popular tourist destination famous for their mountaineering routes, camping and recreational facilities. Almaty Reserve and Ile-Alatau State National park are partially situated in the mountains.

The Talgar mountains are peculiar of vertical zonality, that specified a wide variety of landscapes. The high-mountainous nival glacial band occupies altitudes of 3000 m and more above sea level and is characterized by sharp tops and steep stony declines. It is the place of formation of glaciers whose tongues penetrate into spur valleys of the head rivers. The basic type of vegetation is alpine meadows, rich in edelweisses, alpine poppies, daisies and original high-mountain sedge bogs. Pik Talgar is the highest peak of the Talgar mountains and Zailiisky Alatau as well. Its highest point reaches 4,979 metres above sea level. The peak is located about 10 km from the center of Talgar.

The sub-alpine chord (2400–3000 m) of the Talgar mountains is characterized by dominant high-grass meadows and steppe with juniper bushes on southern stony slopes. The erosive relief of the middle part of the mountains occupies absolute altitudes in a range of 1700 up to 3000 m. Gorges and narrow valleys up to 700 m. deep with steep slopes are most typical here. The relief of the given chord is notable for intensive by slope processes: talus, downfalls and rockfalls. Bush-meadow-coniferous forest chord has a composite vegetative overlying strata. Northern slopes are occupied by endemic fir-trees of Schrenk, while southern by bushes of dogrose. Also there are aspen forests, and sometimes birch woods. Bushes and small-leaved wood band (1400–1600 m) is located in a submontane part. It was affected by anthropogenic factor, which has changed a tentative vegetative overlying strata. The groves of Siverse apple-tree and wild apricot are remained. On southern slopes rosaries are widely spread.

In general the territory is a young mountain land. Thus, Talgar mountains are notable for catastrophic cyclic natural processes such as earthquakes, mudflows, and snow avalanches.

== Climate ==
In Talgar, the climate is cold and temperate. There is more rainfall in winter than in summer. The Köppen-Geiger climate classification is Dfa. The average annual temperature in Talgar is 7.9 °C (46.2 °F). About 490 mm (19.29 in) of precipitation falls annually.

Climate data for Talgar
Month	Jan	Feb	Mar	Apr	May	Jun	Jul	Aug	Sep	Oct	Nov	Dec	Year
Mean daily maximum °C (°F)	−2.4 (27.7)	−1.0 (30.2)	5.9 (42.6)	15.3 (59.5)	21.0 (69.8)	25.8 (78.4)	28.4 (83.1)	27.6 (81.7)	22.6 (72.7)	14.1 (57.4)	5.1 (41.2)	−0.1 (31.8)	13.5 (56.3)
Mean daily minimum °C (°F)	−12.6 (9.3)	−11.2 (11.8)	−4.1 (24.6)	3.9 (39.0)	9.6 (49.3)	13.9 (57.0)	16.1 (61.0)	14.7 (58.5)	9.4 (48.9)	2.4 (36.3)	−4.5 (23.9)	−9.4 (15.1)	2.4 (36.2)
Average precipitation mm (inches)	24 (0.9)	24 (0.9)	44 (1.7)	73 (2.9)	79 (3.1)	53 (2.1)	35 (1.4)	28 (1.1)	26 (1.0)	44 (1.7)	36 (1.4)	25 (1.0)	490 (19.3)
Source: https://en.climate-data.org/location/8848/
