= Tien Shan Astronomical Observatory =

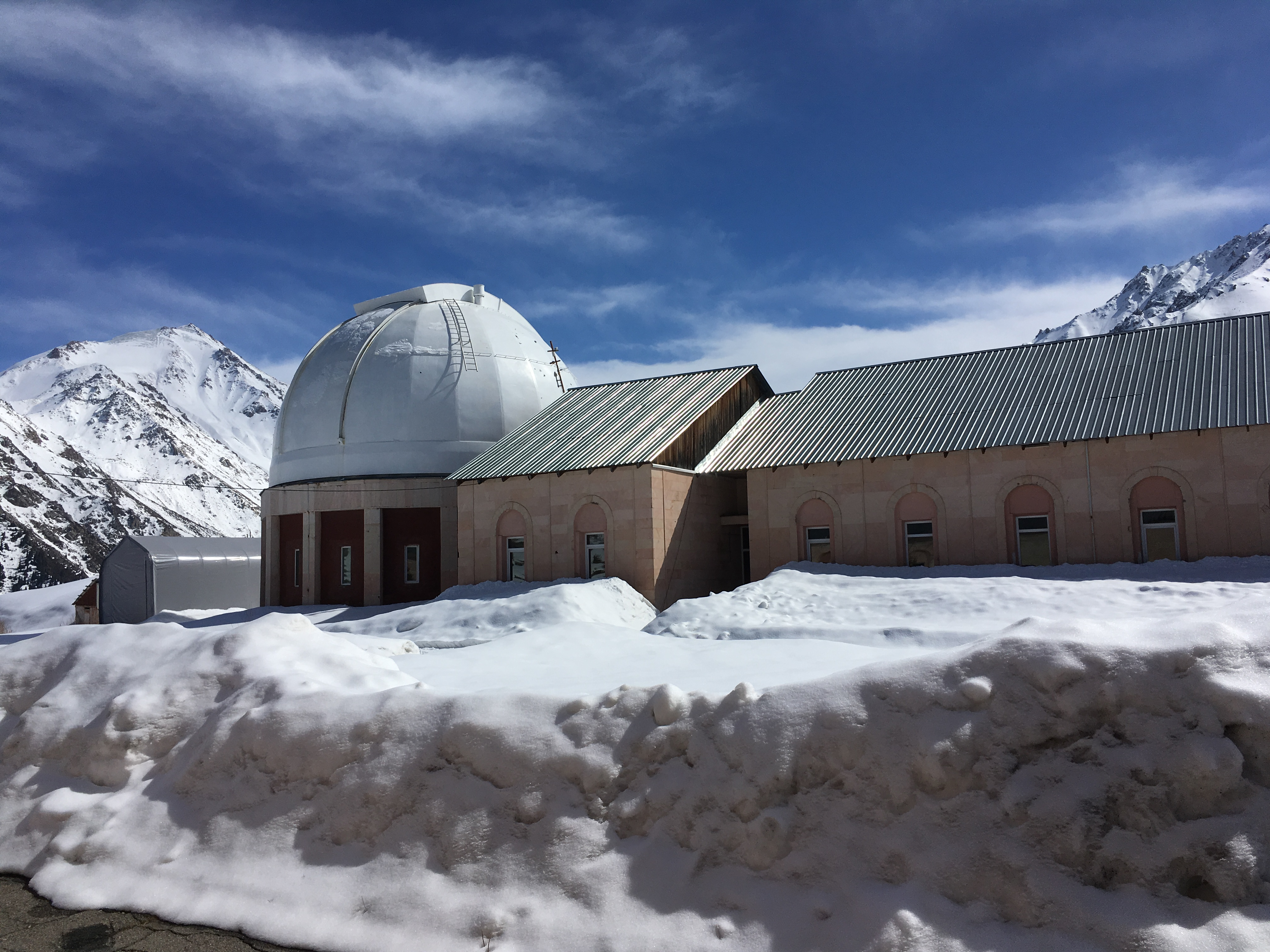
- Radio telescope at Tien Shan Observatory
- Alternative names: TShAO
- Organization: Fesenkov Astrophysical Institute
- Observatory code: N42
- Location: Almaty, Kazakhstan
- Coordinates: 43°03′27″N 76°58′17″E
- Established: 1957
- Website: fai.kz/kz/observatories/tian-shan,%20https://fai.kz/ru/observatories/tian-shan,%20https://fai.kz/en/observatories/tian-shan
- Telescopes: Radio-telescope "Orbita"
- Location of Tien Shan Astronomical Observatory
- Related media on Commons

The Tien Shan Astronomical Observatory (TSHAO, TSAO, or Tien Shan Observatory; observatory code: N42) is an astronomical observatory located in the Tien Shan Mountains at 2,800 meters (9,200 feet) altitude, 30 kilometers south of the city of Almaty in Kazakhstan. It was assigned to the Sternberg Astronomical Institute (GAISh) until the collapse of the Soviet Union. The observatory is a state-owned scientific institution that belongs to the Astrophysical Institute after V.G. Fesenkov. It is often used for photometric investigations of variable stars in the Milky Way, eclipsing systems.

== History ==
The Tien Shan Astronomical Observatory was founded in 1957. It is located in the mountains of Tien Shan at an altitude of 2,735 m (8,973 ft) above sea level, near Big Almaty Lake, 30 km from Almaty city. The observatory has two 1-meter Ritchey–Chrétien telescopes in addition to a number of smaller telescopes. The biggest instrument, however, is a radio telescope.

Between 1994 and 2008, the observatory formed part of the Fesenkov Astrophysical Institute (Kazakhstan's major scientific organization for fundamental research in astronomy and astrophysics). Currently it forms part of Kazakhstan's National Center for Space Research and Technologies.

After the fall of the Soviet Union in 1991, none of the observatory's 1-meter telescopes were in working order on account of outdated equipment and lack of spare parts. In 2013 work was completed on the observatory's East 1-meter telescope, and in late spring of 2014 its second 1-meter telescope (called "West") entered service.

Currently both telescopes have remote up-to-date control systems. The telescopes' remote controls are managed via Internet.

The observatory has undertaken various projects since the new equipment was installed. This includes observations of exoplanets (extra-solar planets), studies of faint stars in the Milky Way (that resulted in discovery of a total of 20 variable stars), studies of stars, recording of afterglow of gamma-ray bursts, and various other projects.

In collaboration with the South Korean Institute for Astronomy and Space Sciences, the Tien Shan Observatory is planning to install an automated telescope of 50 cm in diameter. The telescope will be linked to the four similar telescopes in Mongolia, South Africa, Australia, and Turkey, and will become part of the global network of small telescopes.

== Telescopes ==
- Two Ritchey-Chretien-Coudet telescopes. Their mirror diameter comprises 1-meter (Zeiss-1000), and they're equipped with semi-automatic directing system. The equipment also includes photographic device, UAGS spectrograph, focus shortening photographic system, and Fabri-Perrot interferometer. The telescopes are also equipped with two-channel polarimeter with the digital data processing system.
- Two Cassegrain telescopes. Their mirror diameter is 48 cm, equipped with photoelectric photometers used for simultaneous digital data acquisition from four photometric channels.
- HSFA horizontal solar telescope-spectrograph.

Moreover, the observatory is also equipped with a 20 cm Coudet refractor, an ACU-5 horizontal solar telescope, a Nikolsky coronograph, a Schmidt astrograph, and an 80 cm reflector.

== Gallery ==
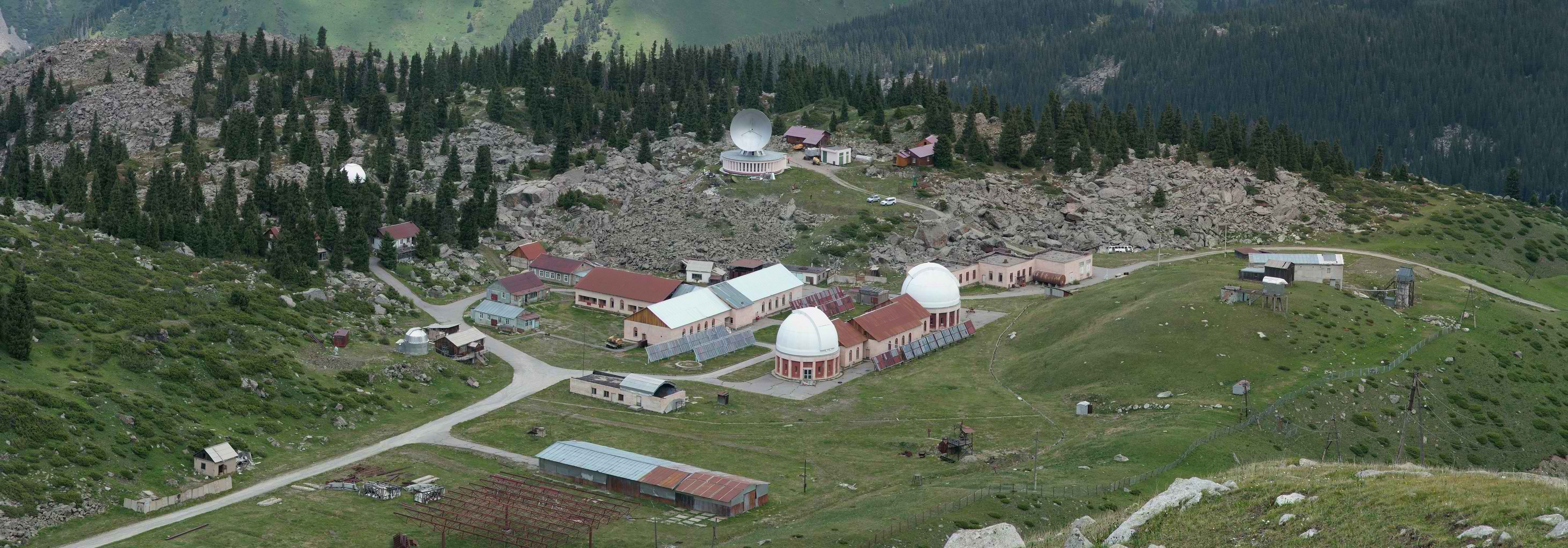
Panorama of Tien Shan astronomical observatory

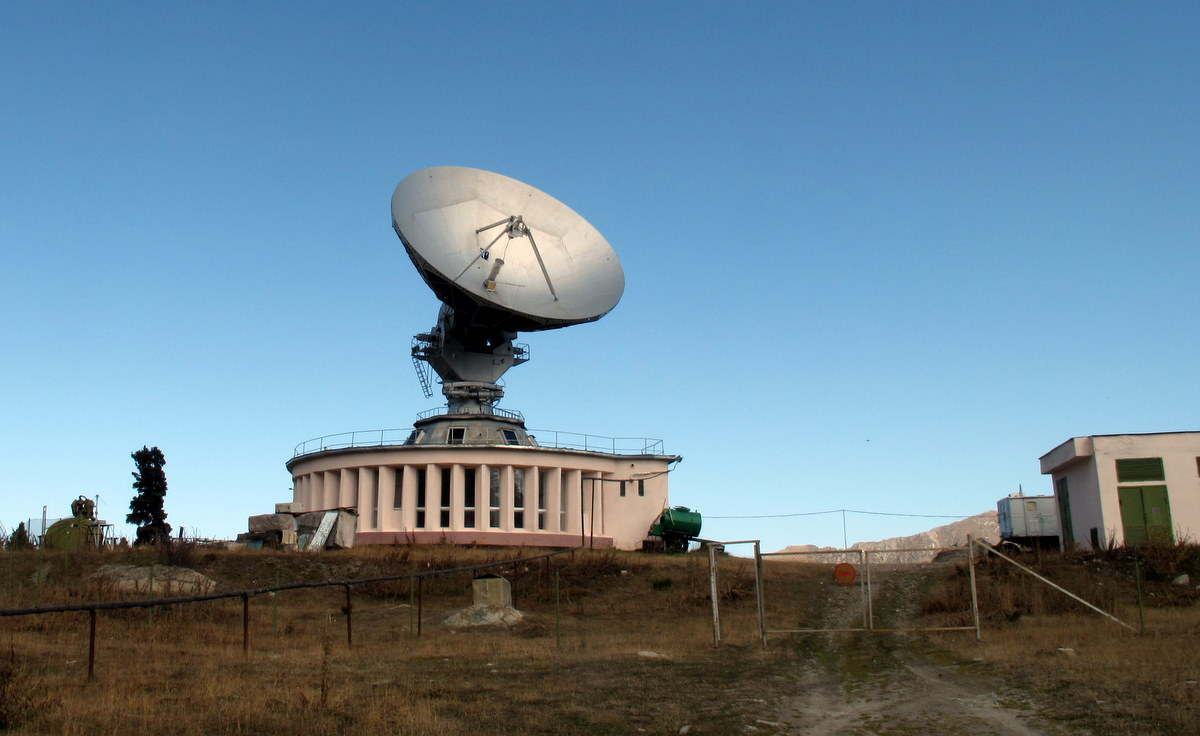
Radio-telescope "Orbita"

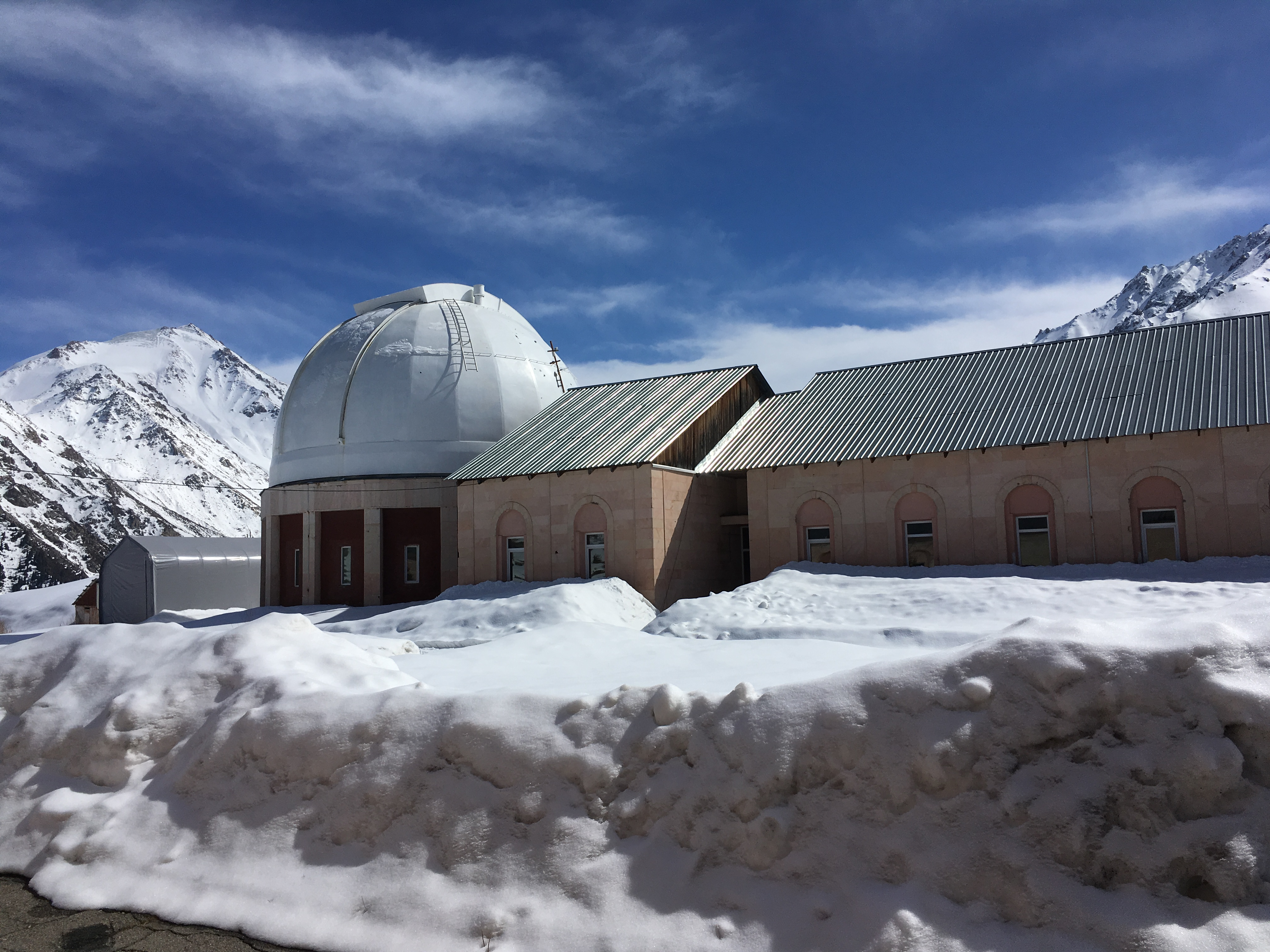
Telescope dome

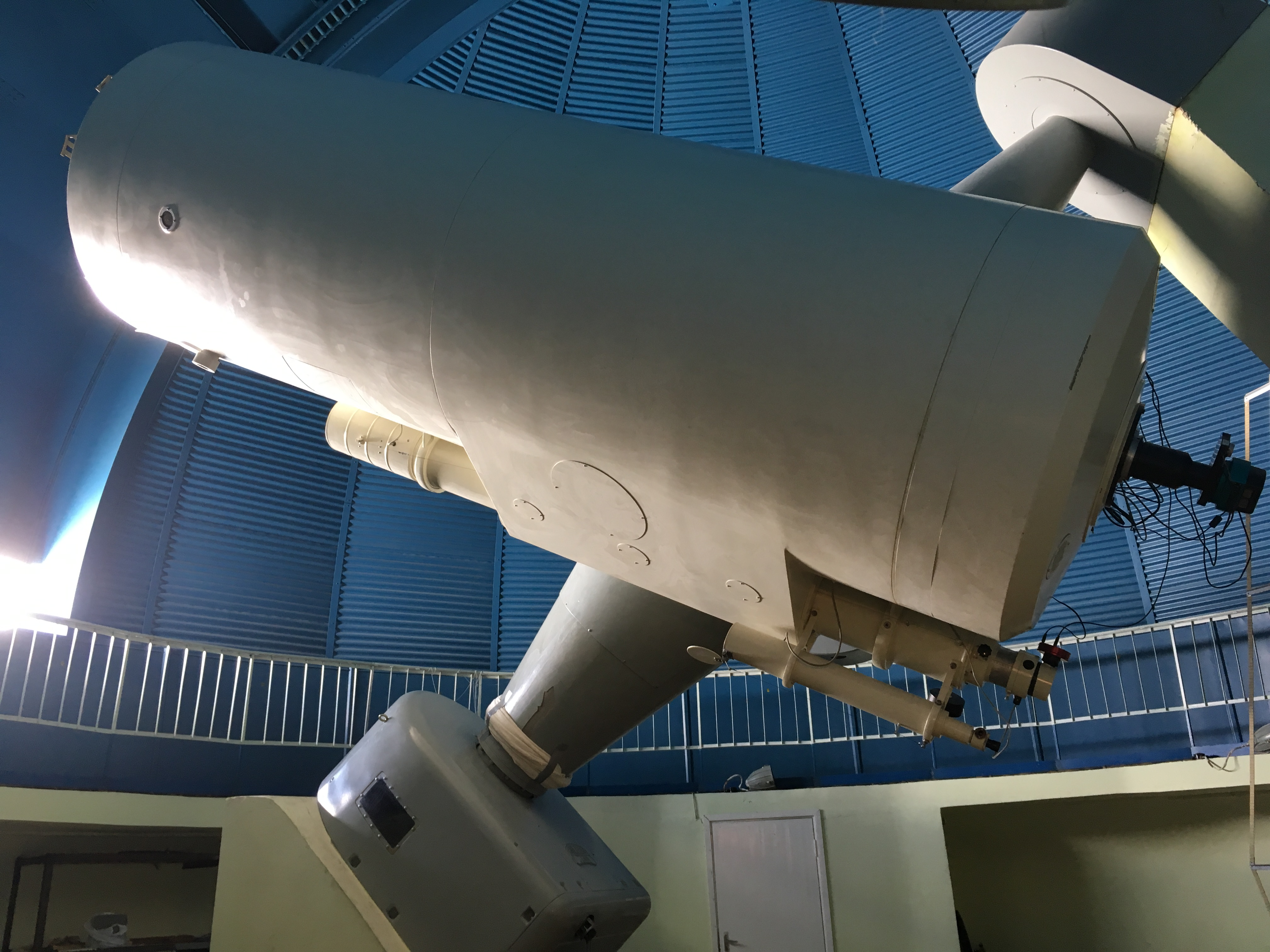
Optical telescope Zeiss-1000
