= Pik Talgar =

Mountain in Kazakhstan

- Talgar Peak
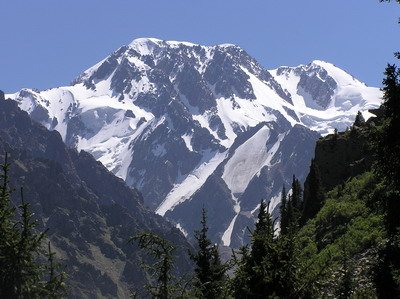

Highest point
- Elevation: 4,979 m (16,335 ft)
- Prominence: 2,982 m (9,783 ft); Ranked 95th
- Listing: Ultra
- Coordinates: 43°07′06″N 77°20′27″E

Geography
- Location within Kazakhstan
- Location: Almaty Province, Kazakhstan
- Parent range: Trans-Ili Alatau, Tian Shan

Peak Talgar (Kazakh: Талғар шыңы Talğar Şyñy; Russian: Пик Талгар, romanized: Pik Talgar) is a northern peak in the Tian Shan mountain range in Kazakhstan, named after Talgar river and city. It is the highest peak of the Trans-Ili Alatau. Due to its close proximity to the former capital of Kazakhstan, Almaty, it is a popular mountaineering destination. Sources differ on Peak Talgar's elevation, but the 4,979 m height is widely quoted. Peak Talgar is ranked 95th by prominence.

The summit has precipitous slopes, especially in the west, crevasses and buttresses packed with snow and ice.

On the southern slopes of the Talgar massif is the largest glacier in the Trans-Ili Alatau - the Korzhnevsky glacier. The length of the glacier is about 12 km. The snow boundary on the northern slopes passes at about 3,700-3,900 m.

== History ==
In 1935 H. Rakhimov's group approached Talgar Peak, climbing from the north to the shoulder of the massif, they reached place was named Kopr.

The first ascent of the main summit of Talgar Peak was made in 1938 by a group from Stalinsk (now Novokuznetsk), consisting of L. Kutukhtin, G. Makarov, and I. Kropotov. A local veteran climber A.E. Kolokolnikov gave a detailed description of Talgar Peak.

In 1958 the group led by Snesarev used one of the most difficult routes to date to Talgar Peak on the west face to the south top. Later on this wall two more routes 5B of the touring group and the route of 1966 by M.Akimenkov and I.Meshkov's group, passed in 1978, will be done.

Since 1939, in the gorge of the Middle Talgar River, there was a climbing camp "Metallurg", later renamed "Talgar". The camp existed almost until 1990. During this time, 11 routes were laid to the top of Talgar, not counting the paths to nearby peaks, such as Metallurg (4600m), Kopr (4631m), Chekist (4550m), Aktau (4686m), Sportivnaya (4117m) ), Karaulchatau (4504m).

== See also ==
- List of Ultras of Central Asia
- Talgar
