= Trans-Ili Alatau =

Mountain range in Kazakhstan and Kyrgyzstan

Ile Alatau
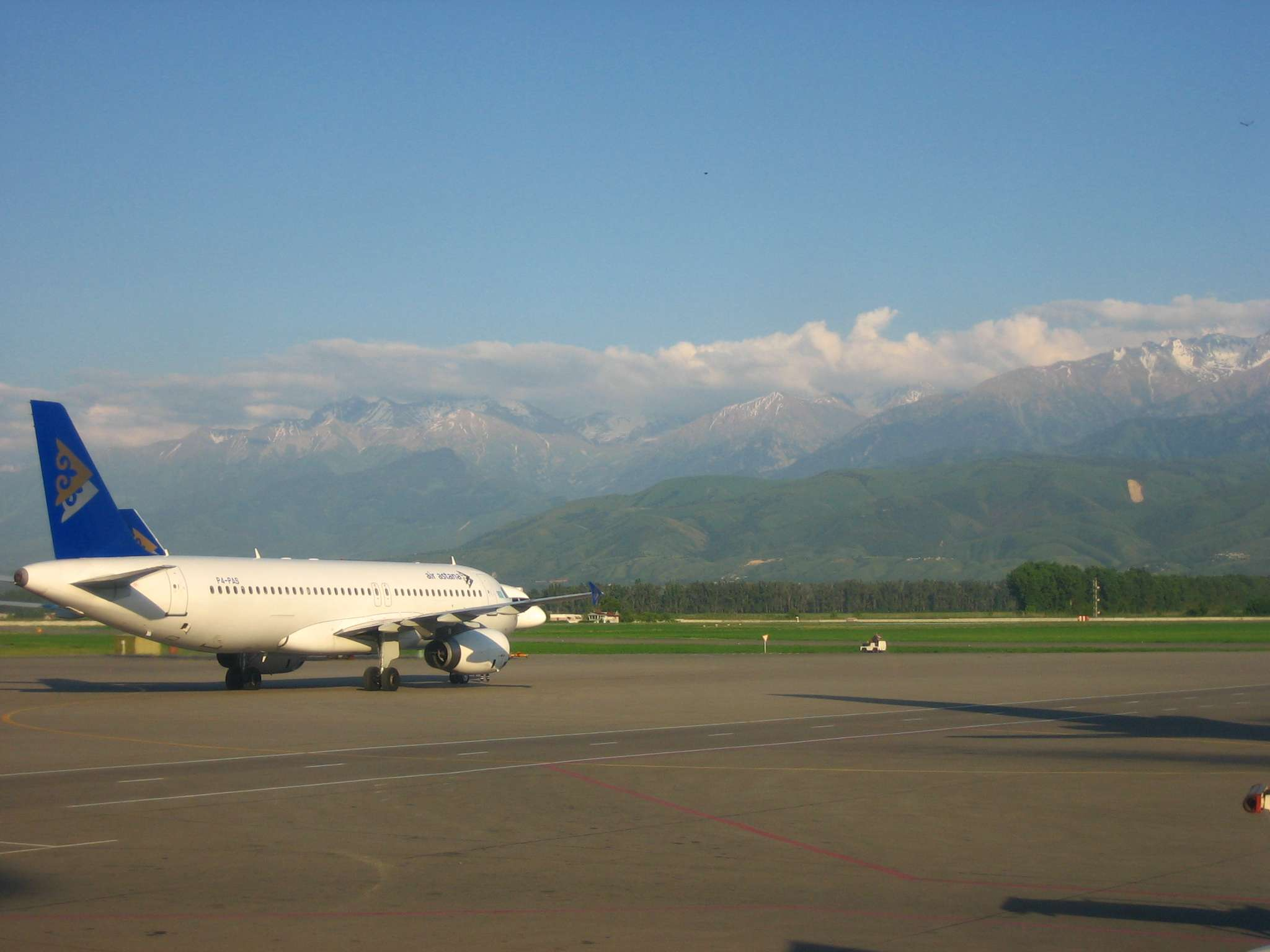
- Ile Alatau as seen from Almaty International Airport

Highest point
- Peak: Talgar Peak
- Elevation: 4,973 m (16,316 ft)

Dimensions
- Length: 350 km (220 mi) E-W

Naming
- Native name: Ile Alatauy (Kazakh)

Geography
- Countries: Kazakhstan and Kyrgyzstan
- Range coordinates: 43°03′N 77°15′E

Ile Alatau (Kazakh: Ile Alatauy, Іле Алатауы), also spelt as Trans-Ili Alatau, is a part of the Northern Tian Shan mountain system (ancient Mount Imeon) in Kazakhstan and Kyrgyzstan. It is the northernmost mountain range of Tian Shan, stretching for about 350 km (220 mi) with a maximal elevation of 4,973 m (16,316 ft) (Talgar Peak). The term "Alatau" refers to a kind of mountain characterized by interleaving areas of vegetation, scattered rocks and snows. The range is bounded in the north by the Ili Depression of the Ili River, hence the name.

The former capital of Kazakhstan, Almaty, is located at the foot of the range. The Ile-Alatau National Park is a protected area in the Ile Alatau.

== Topography ==
The Zailiisky Alatau Range is one of the northernmost arcs of the Tian Shan mountain system. It is located at 43°N, within 75-78°E, partly in Kazakhstan, Kyrgyzstan, and China. The range begins in the west within the Chu River and extends 280 km eastward to the Chilik River. To the north of the axial ridge slopes gently down to the Chu-Ili Range and the Balkhash-Alakol Basin with the lower Ili River, in the south the ridge is separated from the Kungei Alatau by longitudinal intermountain valleys of two rivers - Chilik and Chonkemin. In the area of their sources, the ranges are connected through the Chilico-Kemin mountain junction. The prevailing altitudes - 4000–4600 m, the highest point - Talgar peak (4973–4979 m). On the northern slope is the Gorodetsky Glacier. The highest part of the Trans-Ili Alatau in the vicinity of Talgar Peak between the sources of the Talgar River, the upper Chilik River and the Chiliko-Kemin mountain junction is called the Talgar massif.

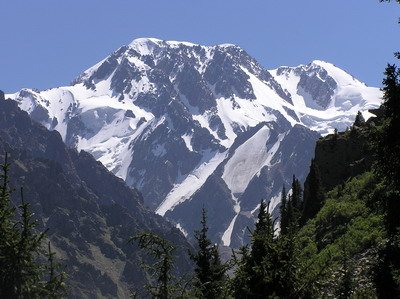
The highest point of the Trans-Ili Alatau, Talgar Peak, is visible from Almaty

== Fauna ==
In the nature conservation part of the Zailiyskiy Alatau, which is part of the Almaty nature reserve, there are: lynx, maral, roe deer, badger, hare and stone marten. The mountainous area is inhabited by black grouse, golden eagles, bearded vultures, mountain and bearded partridges, Himalayan snowcocks, juniper dubonos, blue birds, woodpeckers and nutcrackers.

== Climate ==
Trans-Ili Alatau has the features of a high-altitude, continental climate. The position of the ridge in the center of Eurasia and relatively close range to the equator has contributed to an increase in heat, decrease in moisture and creation of its own microclimate in Trans-Ili Alatau.

== Glaciation ==
In total, as of 2008, there are 441 glaciers with a total area of 171 km^{2} and a volume of 6.9 km^{3}. There are almost all morphological types of glaciers. The largest is the complex valley Korzhenevsky glacier, its area is 38 km^{2}. The glaciers are quite severely frozen.

One of the reference glaciers of the World Glacier Monitoring Service - Central Tuyuksu (Tuyuksu) - is located in Zailiisky Alatau. The Tuyuksu glacier (3.3 km^{2}) has the longest mass-balance line in the territory of the former USSR. The thermal balance of the glacier and its velocities (20-50, up to 90 m/year) are also monitored.

Glaciation of the ridge, following the trend of the entire northern hemisphere, has been decreasing since the end of the Fernau stage (mid XIX century) to the present. Degradation rates have increased since the late 1950s, with glaciation decreasing by 41% over the past 60 years.

== Peak Robeson ==
A mountain summit in the western Tian Shan and Ile Ala-Tau mountains is named after the late African-American entertainer and activist, Paul Robeson who advocated the U.S.-Soviet friendship.
