= List of Altai Mountains =

The following is a list of the mountains in the Altai range.

| Name | Elevation | Coordinates | Location | Parent range |
|---|---|---|---|---|
| Belukha | 4506 | 49°48′25″N 86°35′23″E | Russia–Kazakhstan border | Katun Ridge |
| Khüiten Peak | 4374 | 49°08′45″N 87°49′09″E | China–Mongolia border | Tavan Bogd |
| Mönkhkhairkhan | 4231 | 46°53′24″N 91°28′24″E | Mongolia | Mongol-Altai Mountains |
| Sutai | 4220 | 46°37′03″N 93°35′39″E | Mongolia | Mongol-Altai Mountains |
| Tsast Uul | 4193 | 48°40′54″N 90°43′30″E | Mongolia | Tsambagarav |
| Korona Altaya | 4178 | 49°48′57,88″N 86°31′25,83″E | Russia, Altai Republic | Katun Ridge |
| Maasheybash | 4177.7 | 50°03′49″N 87°34′04″E | Russia, Altai Republic | Northern Chuya Range |
| Tsambagarav | 4127 | 48°39'18.7"N 90°50'49.4"E | Mongolia | Tsambagarav |
| Русский шатер ru | 4117 | 49°10′40″N 87°49′24″E | Russia–Mongolia border | Tavan Bogd |
| Nairamdal Peak | 4082 | 49°10′3″N 87°48′44″E | Mongolia-Russia-China border | Tavan Bogd |
| Malchin Peak | 4050 | 49°10′17″N 87°52′32″E | Russia–Mongolia border | Tavan Bogd |
| Актуру_(гора) | 4044.4 | 50°05′38″N 87°40′43″E | Russia, Altai Republic | Северо-Чуйский_хребет |
| Kharkhiraa | 4040 | 49°34′11″N 91°23′7″E | Mongolia | Mongol-Altai Mountains |
| Türgen | 4029 | 49°47′57″N 89°45′15″E | Mongolia | Mongol-Altai Mountains |
| Khökh Serkh | 4019 | 48°3′2″N 90°51′59″E | Mongolia | Mongol-Altai Mountains |
| Sayr Uul | 3984 | 48°22′39″N 90°33′09″E | Mongolia | Mongol-Altai Mountains |
| Куркурек ru | 3982 | 50°07′29.34″N 87°39′18.53″E | Russia, Altai Republic | Северо-Чуйский_хребет |
| Baatar Hayrhan | 3980 | 46°58′10″N 92°43′28″E | Mongolia | Mongol-Altai Mountains |
| Монгун-Тайга | 3976 | 50°16′46,40″N 90°07′12,40″E | Russia, Tuva | Mongun-Taiga |
| 50 лет КПСС ru | 3972 | 49°48′28,88″N 86°40′35,83″E | Russia, Altai Republic | Катунский_хребет |
| Ирбисту_(вершина) | 3967 | 49°45′30″N 88°05′10″E | Russia, Altai Republic | Южно-Чуйский_хребет |
| Карагем-Баш ru | 3962 | 50°04′02.4″N 87°37′55.44″E | Russia, Altai Republic | Северо-Чуйский_хребет |
| Ikh Bogd | 3957 | 44°59′42″N 100°13′51″E | Mongolia | Gobi-Altai Mountains |
| Asgat Turgen Uul | 3952 | 49°50′14″N 89°45′59″E | Mongolia | Mongol-Altai Mountains |
| Tsengel Khairkhan | 3943 | 48°38′51″N 89°9′22″E | Mongolia | Mongol-Altai Mountains |
| Иикту | 3936 | 49°49′15″N 87°37′34″E | Russia, Altai Republic | Южно-Чуйский_хребет |
| Металлург ru | 3933 | 49°53′19.48″N 87°41′38.27″E | Russia, Altai Republic | Южно-Чуйский_хребет |
| Джаниикту | 3922 | 49°46′53″N 87°57′38″E | Russia, Altai Republic | Южно-Чуйский_хребет |
| Öndör Khairkhan | 3914 | 48°20′16.4″N 88°36′15.5″E | China–Mongolia border | Mongol-Altai Mountains |
| Шенелю ru | 3889 | 49°47′04.24″N 87°00′52.38″E | Russia, Altai Republic | Катунский_хребет |
| Брат ru | 3867 | 49°47′02.25″N 87°43′26.91″E | Russia, Altai Republic | Южно-Чуйский_хребет |
| Тесьтой ru | 3862 | 49°46′32.84″N 88°07′34.84″E | Russia, Altai Republic | Южно-Чуйский_хребет |
| Караоюк ru | 3852 | 49°51′32.16″N 86°37′12.29″E | Russia, Altai Republic | Катунский_хребет |
| Талду Западный ru | 3836 | 49°54′03.62″N 87°42′38.29″E | Russia, Altai Republic | Южно-Чуйский_хребет |
| Aj Bogd | 3802 | 44°47′57″N 95°14′24″E | Mongolia | Gobi-Altai Mountains |
| Коромду ru | 3800 | 50°06′50″N 87°39′48″E | Russia, Altai Republic | Северо-Чуйский_хребет |
| Jargalant Khairkhan | 3796 | 47°41′16″N 92°33′52″E | Mongolia | Mongol-Altai Mountains |
| Крылья Советов ru | 3782 | 50°02′48.51″N 87°41′24.92″E | Russia, Altai Republic | Северо-Чуйский_хребет |
| пик Чуйский ru | 3777 | 49°45′49.7″N 87°46′21.44″E | Russia, Altai Republic | Южно-Чуйский_хребет |
| Buurgeteyn Uul | 3772 | 47°44′13″N 91°03′51″E | Mongolia | Mongol-Altai Mountains |
| Burkhan Buudai | 3765 | 45°40′29″N 96°45′1″E | Mongolia | Gobi-Altai Mountains |
| Красавица ru | 3764 | 50°02′17.29″N 87°27′21.4″E | Russia, Altai Republic | Северо-Чуйский_хребет |
| Burgedtey Khayrkhan Uul | 3754 | 48°11′54″N 90°50′55″E | Mongolia | Mongol-Altai Mountains |
| Ильяс ru | 3746 | 49°43′57.17″N 87°54′20.7″E | Russia, Altai Republic | Южно-Чуйский_хребет |
| Alag Hayrhan | 3739 | 45°34′52″N 94°07′02″E | Mongolia | Mongol-Altai Mountains |
| Пик Криженовского ru | 3727 | 50°03′39.5″N 87°23′03.27″E | Russia, Altai Republic | Северо-Чуйский_хребет |
| Акоюк ru | 3719 | 49°52′30.75″N 86°30′08.25″E | Russia, Altai Republic | Катунский_хребет |
| Снежная ru | 3714 | 50°02′48.45″N 87°44′06.4″E | Russia, Altai Republic | Северо-Чуйский_хребет |
| Джело ru | 3714 | 50°01′18.2″N 87°42′02.2″E | Russia, Altai Republic | Северо-Чуйский_хребет |
| Baga Bogd | 3600 | 44°53′48″N 101°34′36″E | Mongolia | Gobi-Altai Mountains |
| Khasagt Khairkhan | 3578 | 46°47′21″N 95°48′3″E | Mongolia | Mongol-Altai Mountains |
