= List of mountains in Mongolia =

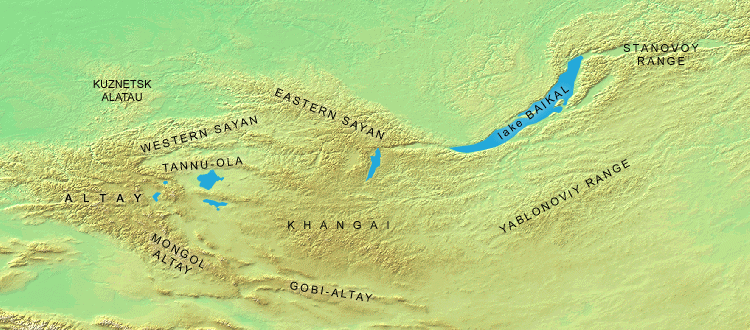
Altai Mountains, Sayan Mountains and Khangai Mountains

Mongolia has three major mountain ranges. The highest is the Altai Mountains, which stretch across the western and the southwestern regions of the country on a northwest to southeast axis. The Khangai Mountains, mountains also trending northwest to southeast, occupy much of central and north-central Mongolia. These are older, lower, and more eroded mountains, with many forests and alpine pastures. The Khentii Mountains near the Russian border to the northeast of Ulaanbaatar, are lower still.

Thirteen mountains are capped with a glacier in Mongolia.

The following is a list of mountains in Mongolia:

	Name	Peaks	Height (m)	Range	Location
1	Tavan Bogd	Khüiten	4,374	Mongol-Altai	Bayan-Ölgii
1	Tavan Bogd	Nairamdal	4,180	Mongol-Altai	Bayan-Ölgii
1	Tavan Bogd	Malchin	4,050	Mongol-Altai	Bayan-Ölgii
2	Mönkhkhairkhan	Sukhbaatar	4,204	Mongol-Altai	Khovd, Bayan-Ölgii
3	Tsambagarav	Tsast	4,196	Mongol-Altai	Bayan-Ölgii, Khovd
3	Tsambagarav	Tsambagarav	4,165	Mongol-Altai	Bayan-Ölgii, Khovd
4	Sutai	Sutai	4,090	Gobi-Altai	Govi-Altai, Khovd
5	Harhiraa		4,037	Mongol-Altai	Uvs
6	Khökh Serkh	Tahilt	4,019	Mongol-Altai	Bayan-Ölgii
7	Otgontenger		4,008	Khangai	Zavkhan
8	Baatar Hairhan		3,984	Mongol-Altai	Khovd
9	Ih Bogd		3,975	Gobi-Altai	Bayankhongor
10	Türgen	Deglii Tsagaan	3,966	Mongol-Altai	Uvs
11	Tsengel Khairkhan		3,943	Mongol-Altai	Bayan-Ölgii
12	Öndor Hairhan		3,914	Mongol-Altai	Bayan-Ölgii
13	Aj Bogd	Ih Ovoo	3,802	Gobi-Altai	Govi-Altai
14	Jargalant Hairhan		3,796	Mongol-Altai	Khovd
15	Burhan Buudai		3,765	Gobi-Altai	Govi-Altai
16	Baga Bogd		3,600	Gobi-Altai	Övörkhangai
17	Hasagt Hairhan		3,578	Gobi-Altai	Govi-Altai
18	Monkh Saridag		3,491	Sayan	Khövsgöl
19	Dunheger		3,225	Gobi-Altai	Govi-Altai
20	Suvraga Hairhan		3,117	Khangai	Arkhangai
	Khan Höhii		2,928		Uvs
	Asralt Hairhan		2,799	Khentii	Töv
	Bogd Khan Mountain		2,261	Khentii	Töv
	Bat Khan Mountain		2,178		Töv
	Burhan Haldun			Khentii	Khentii
	Shiliin Bogd		1,778		Sükhbaatar
	Dari Ovoo		1,354		Sükhbaatar

== See also ==
- Geography of Mongolia
- List of Mongolia-related topics
