= Bogd =

Bogd is a Mongolian word meaning "saint, holy, sacred" and also a place name which may refer to

- Bogd, Bayankhongor, a sum (district) of Bayankhongor Province in Mongolia
- Bogd, Övörkhangai, a sum (district) of Övörkhangai Province in Mongolia
- Bogd Khan, title of the eighth Jebtsundamba Khutughtu after Mongolia' declaration of independence in 1911
- Bogd Khan Mountain, a mountain in central Mongolia
- Aj Bogd, a mountain in the Altai mountains range
- Ikh Bogd, a mountain in the Altai mountains range
- Shiliin Bogd, an extinct volcano in eastern Mongolia
