= Baatar Khairkhan =

Mountain in Khovd Province, Mongolia

- Location within Mongolia

Highest point
- Elevation: 3,984 m (13,071 ft)
- Prominence: 1,541 m (5,056 ft)
- Listing: Ultra
- Coordinates: 46°58′13″N 92°43′38″E

Geography
- Location: Mongolia
- Parent range: Mongol-Altai Mountains

Baatar Khairkhan (Mongolian: Баатар хайрхан уул) is a mountain in Mongolia, located in the Khovd Province. It has a summit elevation of 3,984 m (13,071 ft) above sea level.

== See also ==
- List of ultras of Central Asia
- List of mountains in Mongolia
