= List of ultras of Central Asia =

This is a list of the ultra prominent peaks (with topographic prominence greater than 1,500 metres) in Central Asia. The list is divided topographically rather than politically. There are 75 in total; 21 in the Pamirs, 1 in the Karakum, 5 in the Alays, 24 in the Tian Shan and 24 in the Altai and Mongolia.

== Karakum Desert ==
No	Peak	Country	Elevation (m)	Prominence (m)	Col (m)
1	Arlan	Turkmenistan	1,880	1,748	132

== Pamir Mountains ==
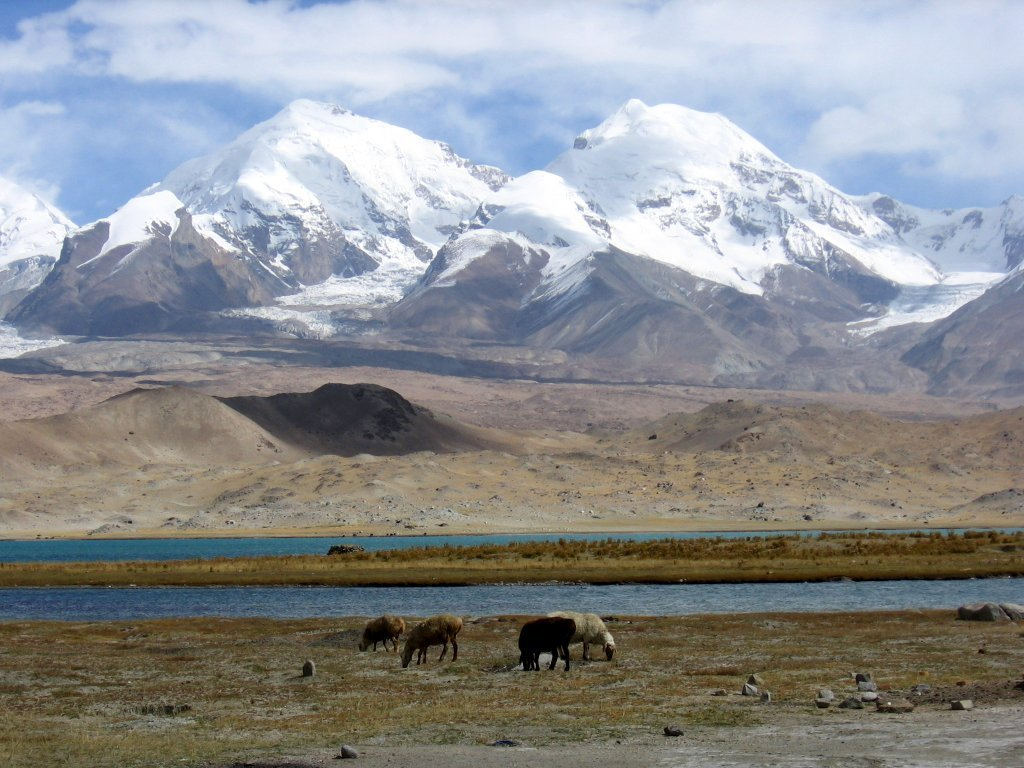
Kongur Tagh, China

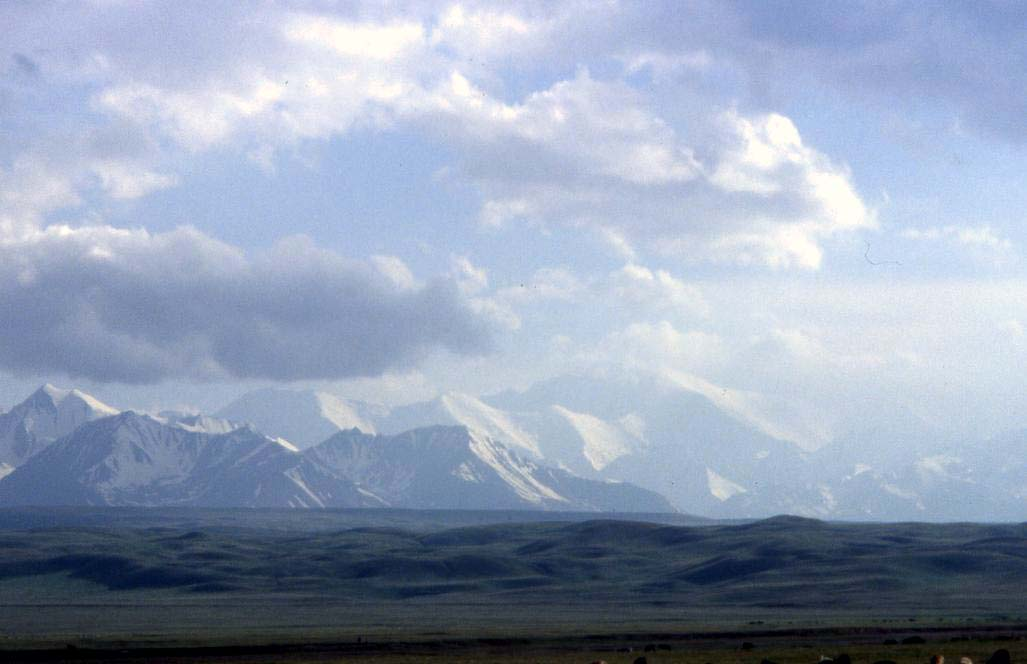
Ibn Sina (Lenin) Peak, Tajikistan

No	Peak	Country	Elevation (m)	Prominence (m)	Col (m)
1	Kongur Tagh	China	7,649	3,585	4064
2	Ismoil Somoni Peak	Tajikistan	7,495	3,402	4093
3	Chakragil	China	6,760	2,934	3826
4	Ibn Sina Peak	Kyrgyzstan / Tajikistan	7,134	2,790	4344
5	Muztagh Ata	China	7,509	2,698	4811
6	Karl Marx Peak	Tajikistan	6,723	2,693	4030
7	Independence Peak	Tajikistan	6,940	2,402	4538
8	Pik Sat	Tajikistan	5,900	2,302	3598
9	Gora Kurumdy	Kyrgyzstan / Tajikistan/ China	6,614	2,278	4336
10	Kuh-i Belandtarin	Afghanistan	6,286	2,008	4278
11	Soviet Officers Peak	Tajikistan	6,233	1,982	4251
12	Patkhor Peak	Tajikistan	6,083	1,963	4120
13	Gora Radzhi-Bek	Tajikistan	5,735	1,940	3795
14	Gora Imeni Fuchika	Tajikistan	4,573	1,686	2887
15	Lyavirdyr	China	6,361	1,676	4685
16	Peak Korzhenevskaya	Tajikistan	7,105	1,650	5455
17	Pik Agasis	Tajikistan	5,877	1,597	4280
18	HP Petra Pervogo Range	Tajikistan	4,745	1,571	3174
19	Qullai Arnavad	Tajikistan	5,992	1,570	4422
20	Point 5859	Tajikistan	5,859	1,569	4290
21	Gora Bogchigir	Tajikistan	5,780	1,508	4272

== Pamir-Alay ==
No	Peak	Country	Elevation (m)	Prominence (m)	Col (m)
1	Chimtarga	Tajikistan	5,490	2,266	3224
2	Pik Skalisty	Kyrgyzstan	5,621	2,095	3526
3	Pik MGU	Tajikistan	5,418	1,825	3593
4	Pik Tandykul	Tajikistan / Kyrgyzstan	5,544	1,677	3867
5	Ayrybaba	Turkmenistan / Uzbekistan	3,138	1,639	1498

== Tian Shan ==
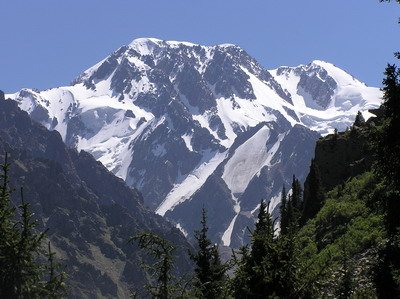
Pik Talgar, Kazakhstan

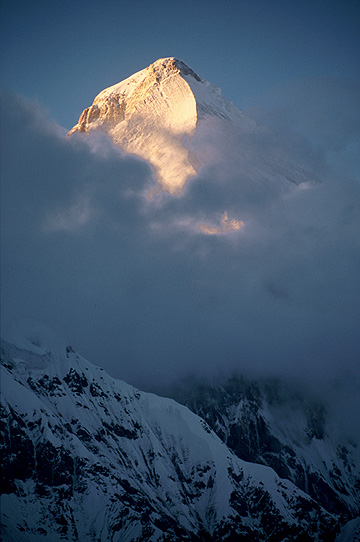
Khan Tengri, Kyrgyzstan/Kazakhstan/China

No	Peak	Country	Elevation (m)	Prominence (m)	Col (m)
1	Jengish Chokusu	Kyrgyzstan / China	7,439	4,148	3291
2	Bogda Feng	China	5,445	4,122	1323
3	Sauyr Zhotasy	Kazakhstan / China	3,840	3,252	588
4	Tomort	China	4,886	3,243	1643
5	Snow Lotus Peak	China	6,627	3,068	3559
6	Pik Talgar	Kazakhstan	4,979	2,982	1997
7	Pik Dankova	Kyrgyzstan	5,982	2,675	3307
8	Heyuan Feng	China	5,289	2,616	2673
9	Gora Alagordy	Kazakhstan / China	4,622	2,480	2142
10	Kertau	China	3,282	2,365	917
11	Semenov-Tian-Shansky Peak	Kyrgyzstan	4,895	2,231	2664
12	Barkol Shan	China	4,300	2,083	2217
13	Muzart	China	6,571	1,822	4749
14	HP Borohoro Shan	China	5,248	1,871	3377
15	Point 4800	China	4,800	1,796	3004
16	Koktutau	China	5,324	1,737	3587
17	Temerliktau	China	3,730	1,718	2012
18	Gora Babash-Ata	Kyrgyzstan	4,428	1,708	2720
19	Yanamax	China	6,357	1,702	4655
20	Dahei Shan	China	3,963	1,692	2271
21	Khan Tengri	Kazakhstan / Kyrgyzstan	7,010	1,685	5310
22	Gora Tastau	Kazakhstan	2,993	1,679	1314
23	Soviet Constitution Peak	Kyrgyzstan	5,281	1,673	3608
24	Point 5716	China	5,716	1,646	4070
25	Point 5318	Kyrgyzstan	5,318	1,563	3755
25	Bozbu Too	Kyrgyzstan	2,875	1,529	1346
26	Gora Boboiob	Tajikistan	3,770	1,502	2268

== Altai region and Mongolia ==
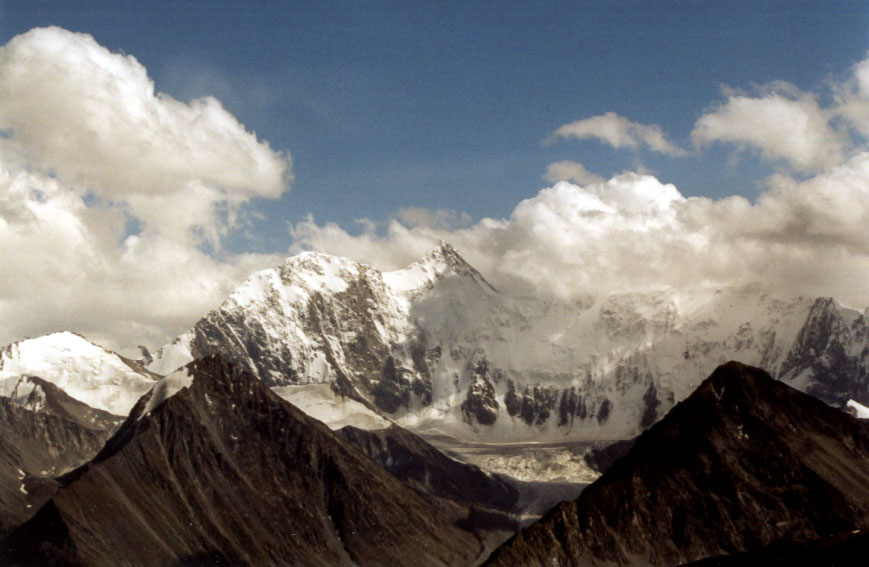
Belukha Mountain, Kazakhstan/Russia

No	Peak	Country	Elevation (m)	Prominence (m)	Col (m)
1	Belukha Mountain	Kazakhstan / Russia	4,506	3,343	1163
2	Jargalant Hairhan	Mongolia	3,796	2,353	1443
3	Khüiten Peak	China / Mongolia	4,374	2,342	2023
4	Otgontenger	Mongolia	4,000	2,259	1741
5	Aj Bogd	Mongolia	3,802	2,132	1670
6	Dunheger	China / Mongolia	3,315	2,075	1240
7	Ikh Bogd	Mongolia	3,957	1,979	1978
8	Mönkh Hairhan	Mongolia	4,231	1,860	2371
9	Harhiraa	Mongolia	4,040	1,808	2232
10	Maasheybash	Russia	4,177	1,806	2371
11	Sutai	Mongolia	4,220	1,787	2433
12	Tsambagarav	Mongolia	4,193	1,757	2436
13	Hasagt Hairhan	Mongolia	3,578	1,749	1829
14	Baga Bogd	Mongolia	3,600	1,725	1875
15	Altan Hohiy	Mongolia	3,350	1,687	1663
16	Gora Mungun-Tayga	Russia	3,970	1,685	2285
17	Bumbag Khairkhan	Mongolia	3,470	1,664	1806
18	Türgen	Mongolia	4,029	1,594	2435
19	Mönkh Saridag	Russia / Mongolia	3,491	1,578	1913
20	Dzhata	China	3,085	1,560	1525
21	Baatar Khairkhan	Mongolia	3,984	1,541	2443
22	Pik Grandioznyy	Russia	2,891	1,529	1362
23	Dund Saihny Nuruu	Mongolia	2,825	1,526	1299
24	HP Khrebet Baldyrgannyg	Mongolia	2,522	1,509	1013
