= Lake Kucherla =

Lake in Siberia, Russia

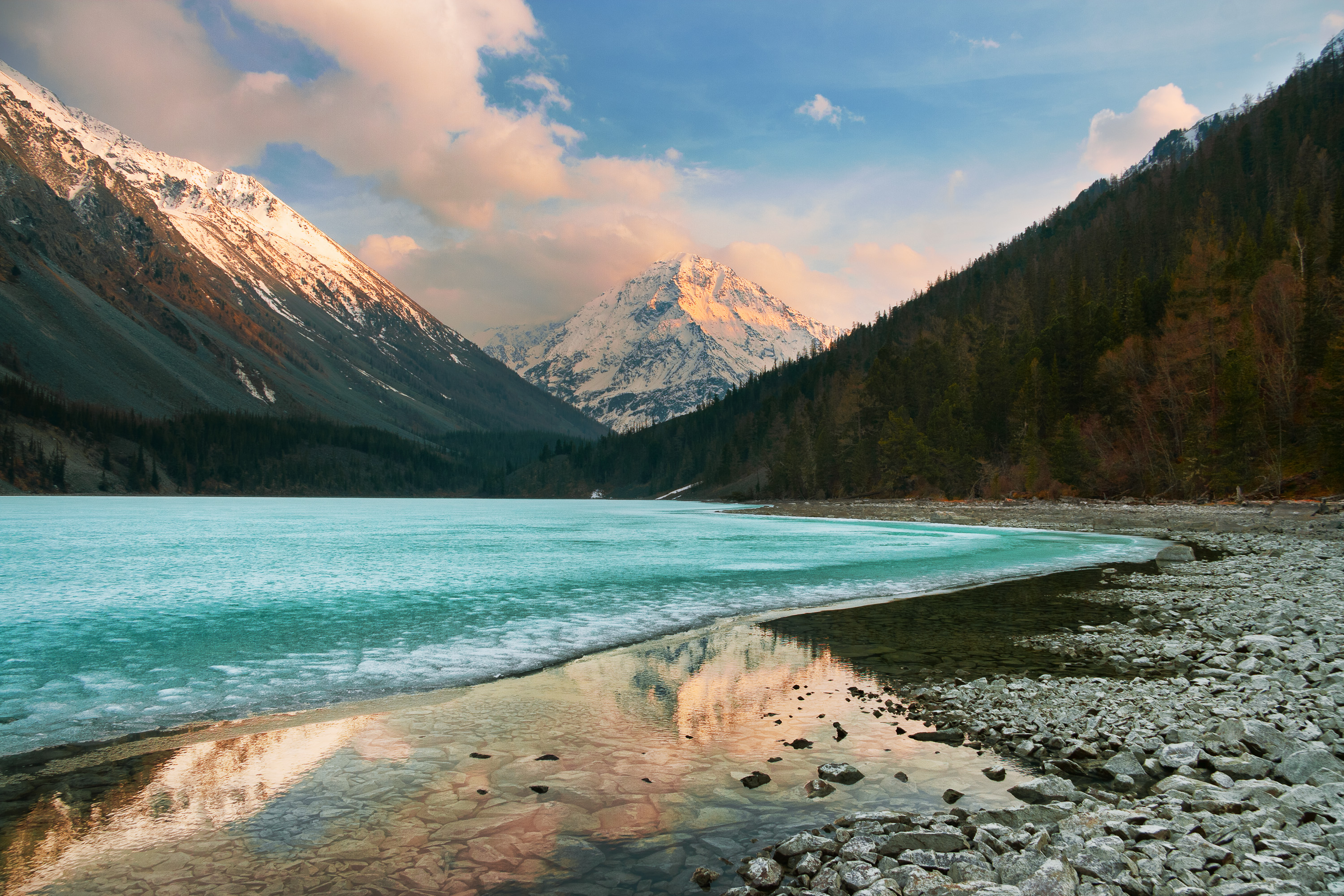
- Sunset at Kucherla Lake

- Location within Altai Republic Location within Russia
- Location: Siberia
- Coordinates: 49°52′33″N 86°24′52″E
- Surface area: 3 square kilometres (1.2 sq mi)
- Max. depth: 54.8 metres (180 ft)
- Surface elevation: 1,790 metres (5,870 ft)

Lake Kucherla (Russian: Кучерлинское) is located in the Altai Mountains and Katun Nature Reserve of Siberia. Together with Lake Teletskoye, Belukha Mountain, and the Ukok Plateau it forms a natural UNESCO World Heritage Site entitled "Golden Mountains of Altai". It is a glacial lake.

The lake is surrounded by alpine meadows and peaks over 3,000 metres (9,800 ft) high. It is situated at the height of 1,790 metres (5,870 ft) above mean sea level, stretching for 4.67 kilometres (2.90 mi) from north to south. The lake area is 3 square kilometres (1.2 sq mi). It is up to 54.8 metres (180 ft) deep. The lake is popular with tourists and holds a stock of grayling.
