= Dünkheger =

Mountain in China and Mongolia

- Location within Mongolia

Highest point
- Elevation: 3,315 m (10,876 ft)
- Prominence: 2,075 m (6,808 ft)
- Listing: Ultra, Ribu
- Coordinates: 45°11′33″N 90°54′24″E

Geography
- Location: China–Mongolia border
- Parent range: Baitag Bogda Mountains of the Altai Range

Dünkheger (Mongolian: Дүнхэгэр уул Dungheger ûûl; Chinese: 冬赫格尔; pinyin: Dōnghègé'ěr; Wade–Giles: Tung-ho-ko-erh), also known as Mount Altun Obo (Mongolian: Altan ôbôô ûûl; Oirat: Altun oboo uulǝ; Chinese: 阿同敖包; pinyin: Ātóng Áobāo; Wade–Giles: A-t'ung-ao-pao), is the highest peak of Baitag Bogda (Oirat: Baitag Bogdǝ uulǝs, Chinese: 北塔山, 拜克达山), a mountain range in the Altai Mountains of Asia. It has an elevation of 3,315 metres (10,876 ft) and is on the international border between Qitai County, China and Khovd Province, Mongolia.

== See also ==
- List of ultras of Central Asia
- List of mountains in Mongolia
- List of mountains in China
