= Kharkhiraa =

Mountain in Uvs, Mongolia

- Location within Mongolia

Highest point
- Elevation: 4,040 m (13,250 ft)
- Prominence: 1,808 m (5,932 ft)
- Listing: Ultra
- Coordinates: 49°34′11″N 91°23′7″E

Geography
- Location: Mongolia
- Parent range: Altai Mountains

Kharkhiraa (Mongolian: Хархираа, romanized: Harhiraa, pronounced [χarçɪˈɾa]; lit. "common crane") is a mountain of the Altai Mountains and is located in the Uvs Province in Mongolia. It has an elevation of 4,040 metres (13,255 ft).

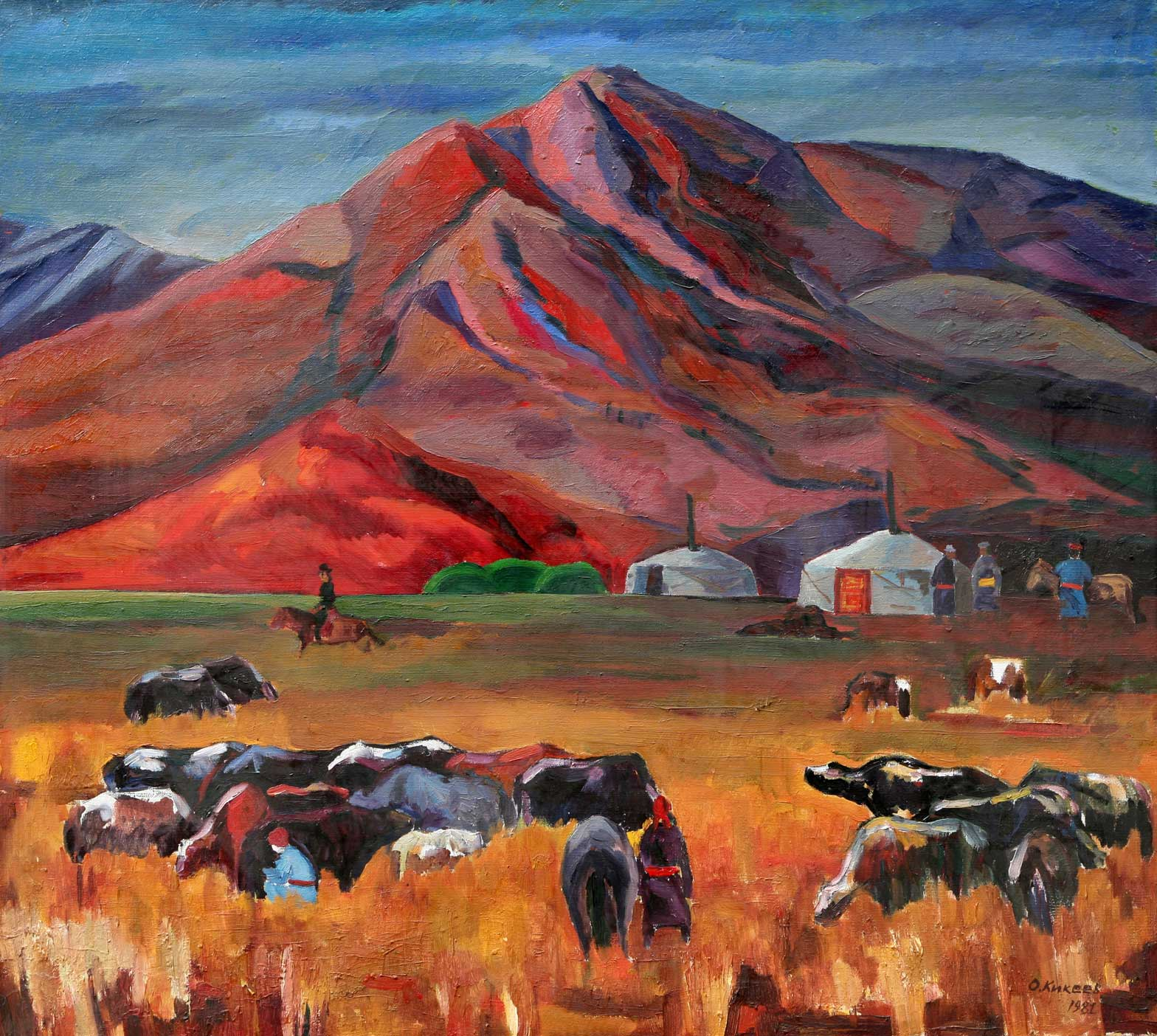
Painting of Kharkiraa by Ochir Kikeyev

== See also ==
- List of mountains in Mongolia
- List of ultras of Central Asia
