= Khasagt Khairkhan =

Mountain in Govi-Altai, Mongolia

- Location within Mongolia

Highest point
- Elevation: 3,578 m (11,739 ft)
- Prominence: 1,749 m (5,738 ft)
- Listing: Ultra, Ribu
- Coordinates: 46°47′21″N 95°48′3″E

Geography
- Location: Mongolia
- Parent range: Gobi-Altai Mountains

Khasagt Khairkhan (Mongolian: Хасагт хайрхан) is a mountain of the Gobi-Altai Mountains and located in the Govi-Altai Province in Mongolia. It has elevation of 3,578 metres (11,739 ft).

== See also ==
- List of ultras of Central Asia
- List of mountains in Mongolia
