= Grandiozny Peak =

Mountain in Krasnoyarsk Krai, Russia

- Пик Грандиозный
- Location within Krasnoyarsk Krai

Highest point
- Elevation: 2,922 m (9,587 ft)
- Prominence: 1,560 m (5,120 ft)
- Listing: Ultra, Ribu
- Coordinates: 53°53′36″N 96°00′27″E

Geography
- Location: Krasnoyarsk Krai, Russia
- Parent range: Kryzhin Range; Eastern Sayan; Sayan Mountains; South Siberian Mountains

Grandiozny Peak (Russian: Пик Грандиозный) is a mountain in Krasnoyarsk Krai, Russia. At 2,690 m (8,830 ft) it is the highest summit in the Kryzhin Range, part of the Eastern Sayan, South Siberian System.

== Description ==
Grandiozny Peak is an impressive-looking 2,922 metres (9,587 ft) high ultra-prominent mountain, the highest point of Krasnoyarsk Krai. It rises in a desolate area of the Sayan Mountains, part of Kuraginsky District, 20 kilometres (12 mi) west of the border of Irkutsk Oblast.

== See also ==
- List of highest points of Russian federal subjects
- List of mountains and hills of Russia
- List of ultras of Central Asia
