= Gora Alagordy =

Mountain in People's Republic of China

Alagordy mountain
- Бесбақан
- Location within Kazakhstan

Highest point
- Elevation: 4,622 m (15,164 ft)
- Prominence: 2,480 m (8,140 ft)
- Listing: Ultra
- Coordinates: 45°02′30″N 80°15′27″E

Geography
- Location: China–Kazakhstan border
- Parent range: Dzungarian Alatau, Tien Shan

Alagordy, also known as Besbakan (Kazakh: Бесбақан; Russian: Алагорды) is a mountain in the Dzungarian Alatau range of the Tian Shan mountains systems. It is located on the international border between Kazakhstan and China. Gora Alagordy has an elevation of 4,622 metres (15,164 ft) above sea level.

== See also ==
- List of ultras of Central Asia
