= Mönkhkhairkhan Mountain =

Second tallest mountain in Mongolia

Mönhhairhan Mountain
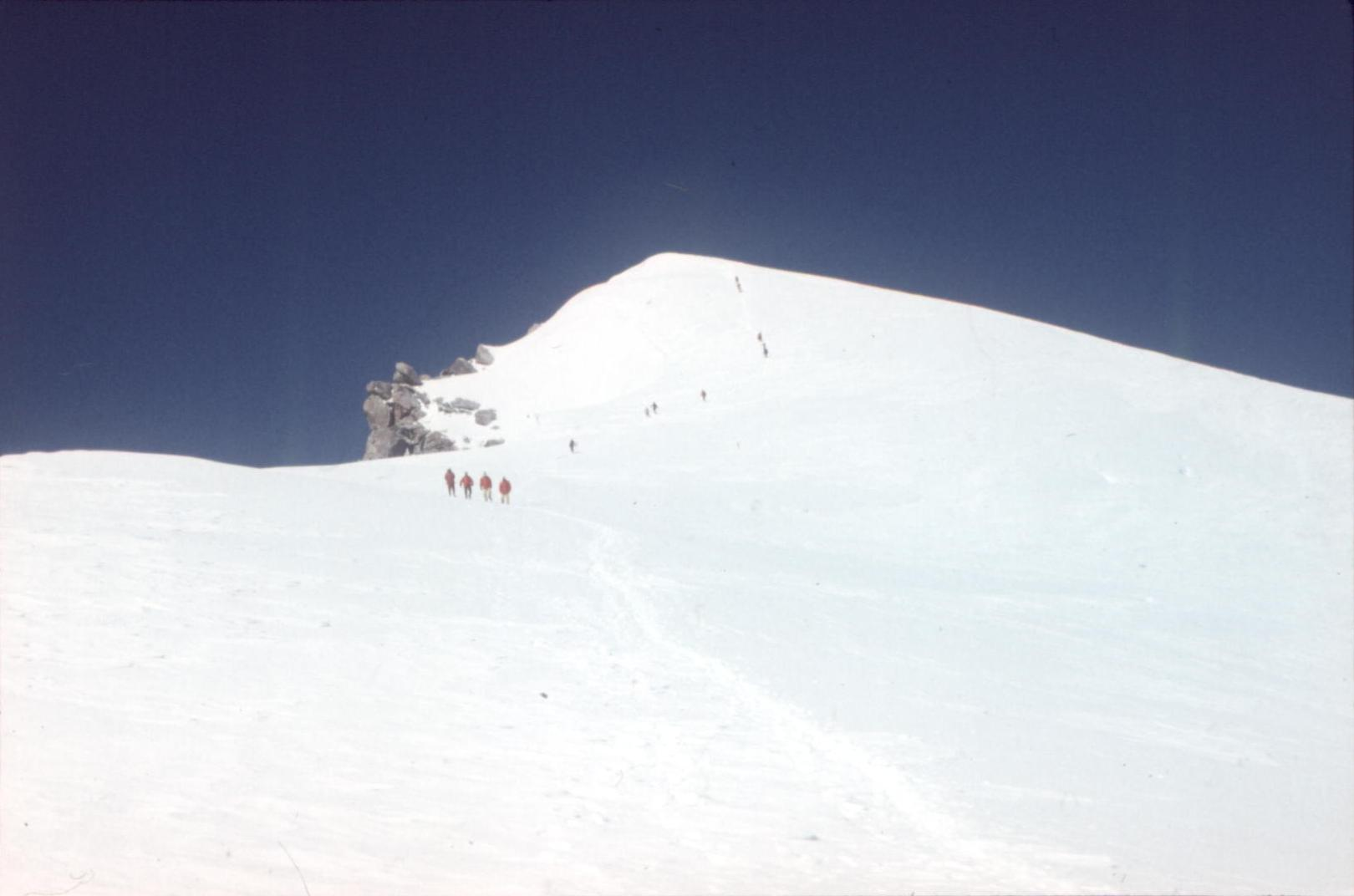
- Mönchchajrchan uul. On the way to the top in 1978

Highest point
- Elevation: 4,231 m (13,881 ft)
- Prominence: 1,860 m (6,100 ft)
- Listing: Ultra
- Coordinates: 46°53′24″N 91°28′24″E

Geography
- Location within Mongolia
- Location: Mongolia
- Parent range: Mongol-Altai Mountains

Mönhhairhan Mountain (Mongolian: Мөнххайрхан уул, romanized: Mönhhairhan uul, pronounced [mɵŋxˈxæe̯rχəɴ ˈʊːɮ]; lit. "Holy eternal mountain") is the second highest mountain in Mongolia, located in the Bayan-Ölgii and Khovd Province.

== See also ==
- List of mountains in Mongolia
- List of ultras of Central Asia
- List of Altai mountains
