= Tsambagarav Uul National Park =

National park of Mongolia

Tsambagarav Uul National Park Цамбагарав уулын Байгалийн цогцолборт газар
- IUCN category II (national park)
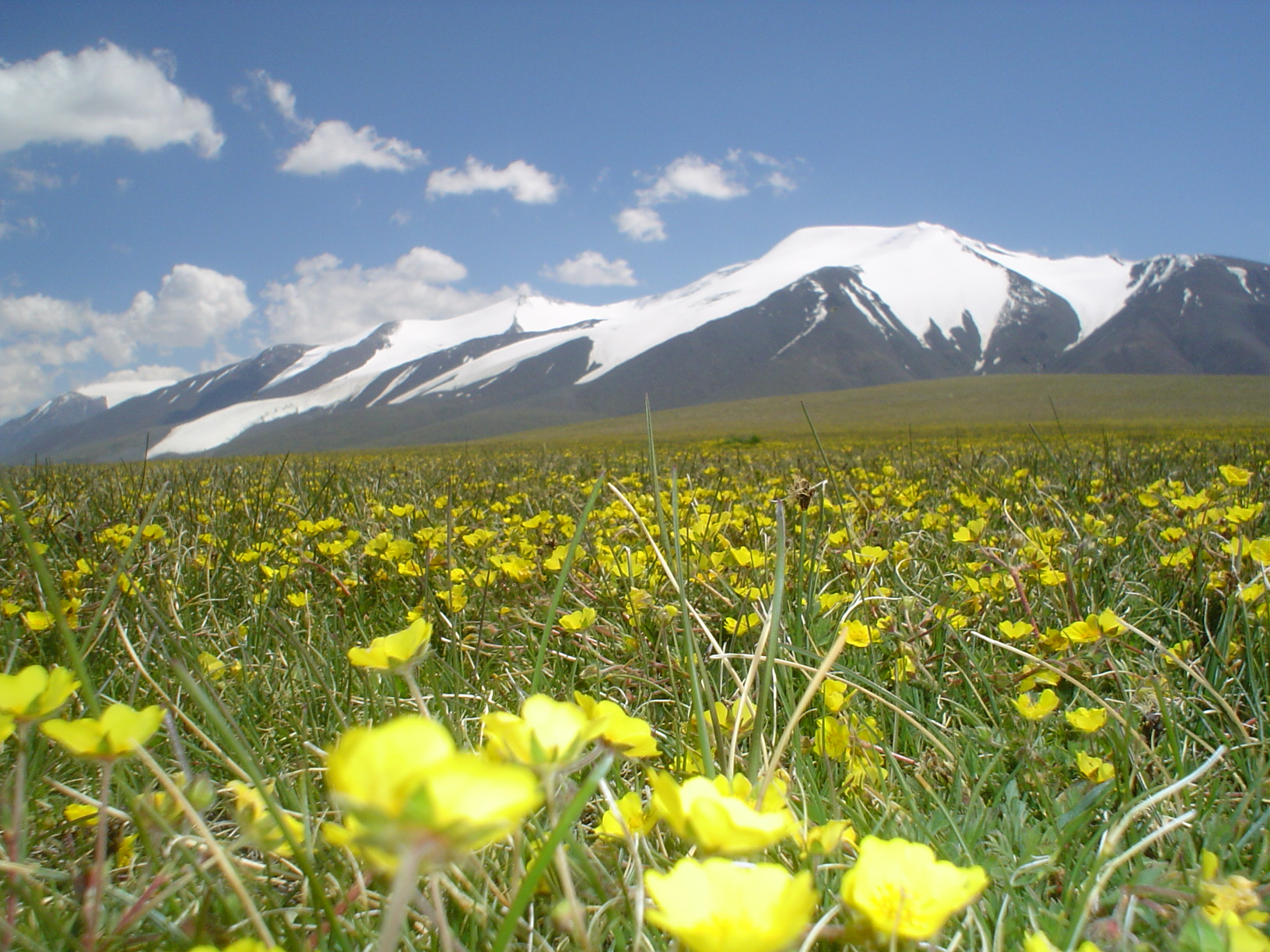
- Tsambagarav Mountain in July

- Location within Mongolia
- Location: Bayan-Ölgii Province, Mongolia
- Coordinates: 48.671°N 90.96°E
- Area: 1,110 km^{2} (430 mi^{2})
- Established: 2000
- Governing body: Ministry of Environment and Green Development of Mongolia

Tsambagarav National Park (also: Cambagarav Mountain; Mongolian: Цамбагарав уулын Байгалийн цогцолборт газар) is a national park in Bayan-Ölgii Province of western Mongolia.

It covers more than 1,110 square kilometres (430 mi^{2}) in a glacial region which includes Tsambagarav mountain of Mongolia. It has a notable population of snow leopards, amongst other species.
