= Mönkh Saridag =

Mountain on the international border between Mongolia and Russia

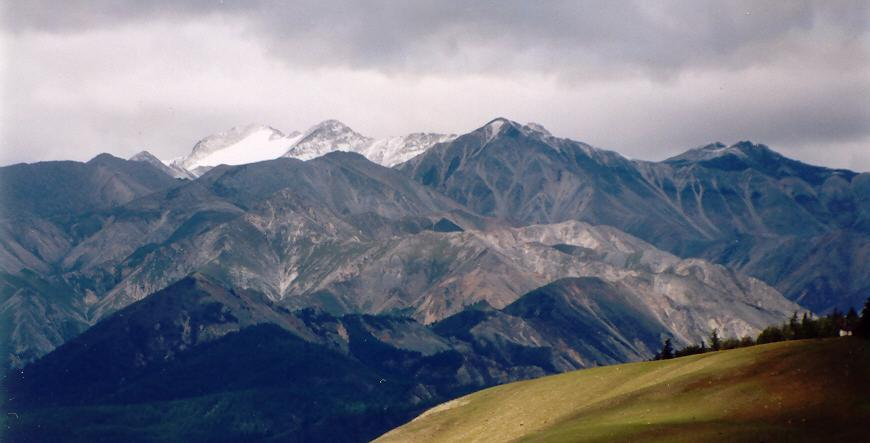
- Eastern Sayan with Mönkh Saridag in the background.

Highest point
- Elevation: 3,491 m (11,453 ft)
- Prominence: 1,578 m (5,177 ft)
- Listing: Ultra, Ribu
- Coordinates: 51°43′08″N 100°36′53″E

Geography
- Location within Mongolia Location within Republic of Buryatia
- Location: Mongolia–Russia border
- Parent range: Sayan Mountains

Mönkh Saridag (Buryat: Мүнхэ Һарьдаг, Mongolian: Мөнх сарьдаг, romanized: Mönkh saridag, lit. 'eternal aiguille'), also spelled as Munku-Sardyk (Russian: Мунку-Сардык), is the highest mountain in the Sayan Mountains of Asia. It is 3,491 metres (11,453 ft) tall and is on the international border between Mongolia and Russia. It is also the highest mountain in Buryatia and the highest mountain in Mongolia's Khövsgöl Province. On the southern side, the tree line is at 2000 meters, on the northern side at 2200 meters.

== See also ==
- List of highest points of Russian federal subjects
- List of ultras of Central Asia
- List of mountains in Mongolia

== Sources ==
- M. Nyamaa, Khövsgöl aimgiin lavlakh toli, Ulaanbaatar 2001, p. 37
