= Khökh Serkh =

Mountain in Mongolia

- Location within Mongolia

Highest point
- Elevation: 4,019 m (13,186 ft)
- Coordinates: 48°3′2″N 90°51′59″E

Geography
- Location: Mongolia
- Parent range: Mongol-Altai Mountains

Khökh Serkh (Mongolian: Хөх сэрх, blue buck) with a latitude of 48.05 (48° 3' 2 N) and a longitude of 90.87 (90° 51' 59 E), is a mountain located in west Mongolia. The highest peak is the Takhilt.

== See also ==
- List of mountains in Mongolia
