= Jargalant Khairkhan =

Mountain in Khovd Province, Mongolia

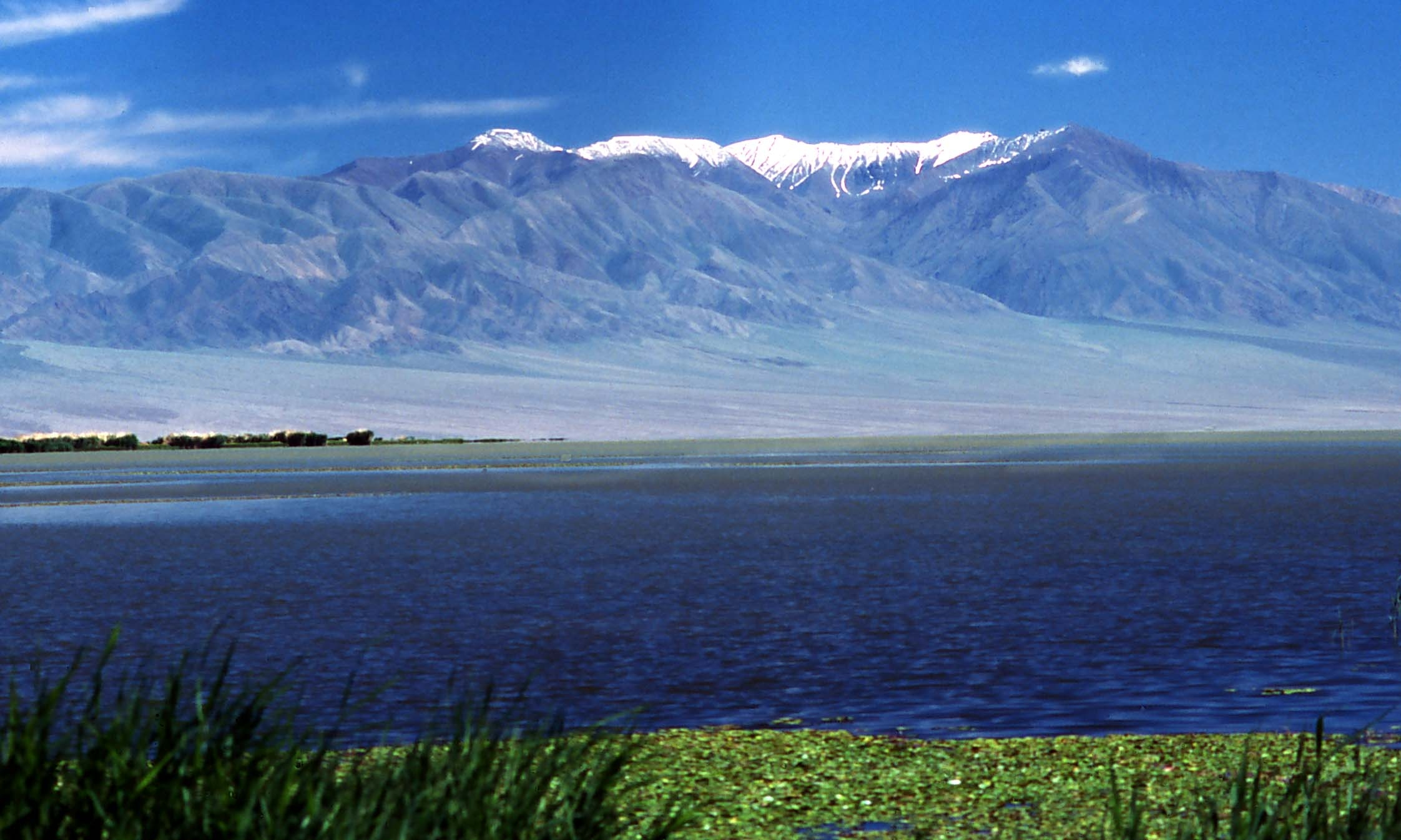
- Jargalant Mountain, above Khar Us Nuur

Highest point
- Elevation: 3,796 m (12,454 ft)
- Prominence: 2,353 m (7,720 ft)
- Listing: Ultra, Ribu
- Coordinates: 47°41′16″N 92°33′52″E

Geography
- Location within Mongolia
- Location: Mongolia
- Parent range: Mongol-Altai Mountains

Jargalant Khairkhan (Mongolian: Жаргалант Хайрхан; lit. 'Holy Blissful Mountain') is a mountain in Mongolia, located in the Khovd Province. It has a summit elevation of 3,796 m (12,454 ft) above sea level. The mountain rises above Khar-Us Lake in Khar-Us Nuur National Park.

== History ==
In June 2024, 15 ibexes were introduced to the mountain to preserve the balance of the mountain ecosystem.

== See also ==
- List of ultras of Central Asia
- List of mountains in Mongolia
