= Baga Bogd =

Mountain in Övörkhangai, Mongolia

- Myangan Yamaat
- Location within Mongolia

Highest point
- Elevation: 3,620 m (11,880 ft)
- Prominence: 1,745 m (5,725 ft)
- Listing: Ultra, Ribu
- Coordinates: 44°53′48″N 101°34′36″E

Geography
- Location: Mongolia
- Parent range: Gobi-Altai Mountains

Baga Bogd (Mongolian: Бага Богд, lit. "lesser saint") is a mountain of the Gobi-Altai Mountains and located in the Övörkhangai Province in Mongolia. Its highest peak Myangan Yamaat has an elevation of 3,620 metres (11,877 ft).

== See also ==
- List of ultras of Central Asia
- List of mountains in Mongolia
