= Yanamax =

Mountain in the Tian Shan range

- Location within Dzungaria Location within Southern Xinjiang

Highest point
- Elevation: 6,357 m (20,856 ft)
- Prominence: 1,702 m (5,584 ft)
- Isolation: 7.49 km (4.65 mi)
- Coordinates: 42°17′06″N 81°02′36.5″E

Geography
- Country: China
- Region: Xinjiang
- Parent range: Tian Shan

Climbing
- First ascent: August 2008 by Guy McKinnon and Bruce Normand

Yanamax is a mountain in the Tian Shan system of mountain ranges in the Xinjiang region of China. Its peak altitude is listed in the American Alpine Club at 6332m, and other sources at 6357m and Google Earth at 6229m.

The first ascent of Yanamax was completed in August 2008 by Guy McKinnon and Bruce Normand.

== Historical maps ==
Historical English-language maps of the region:

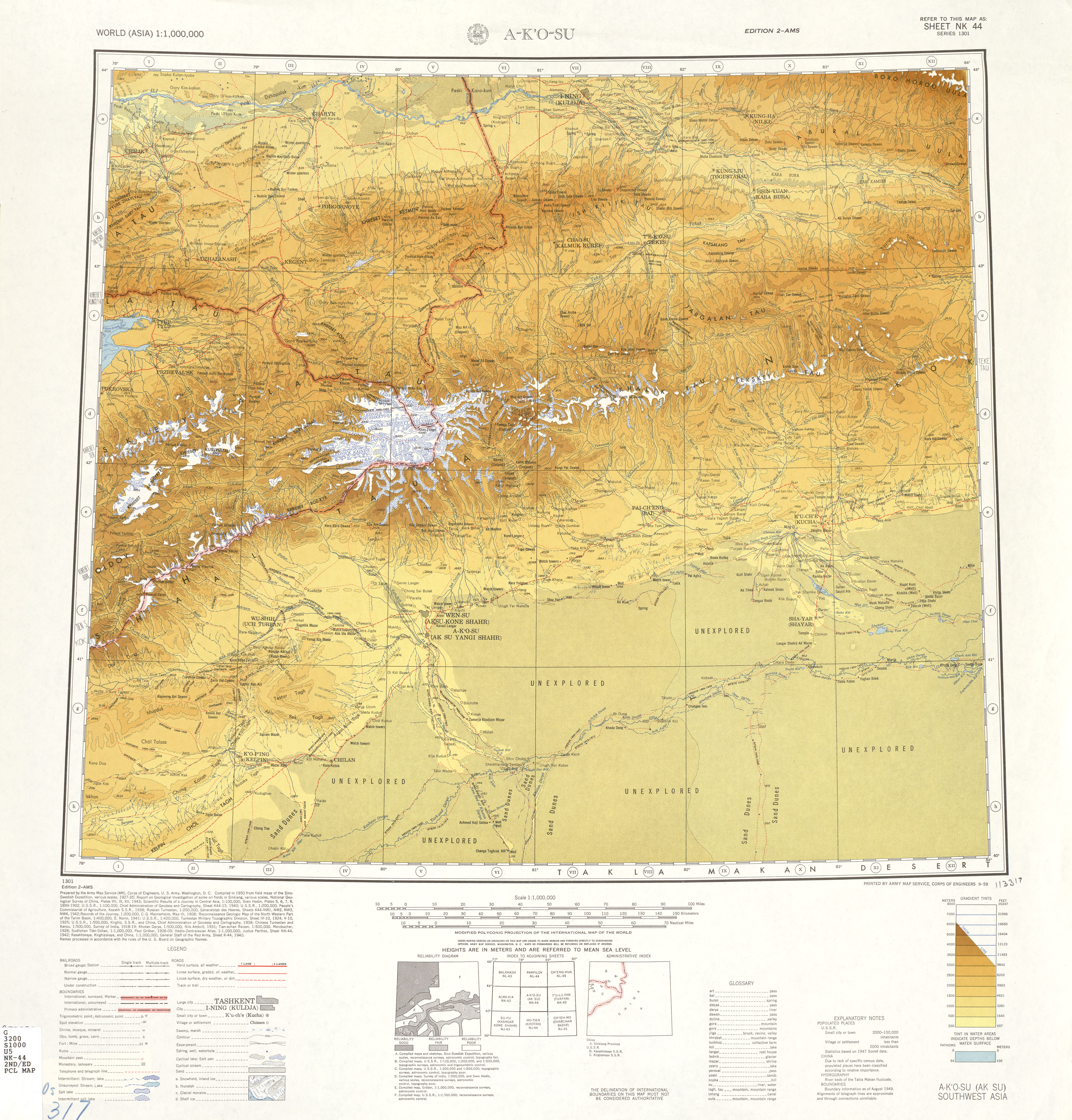

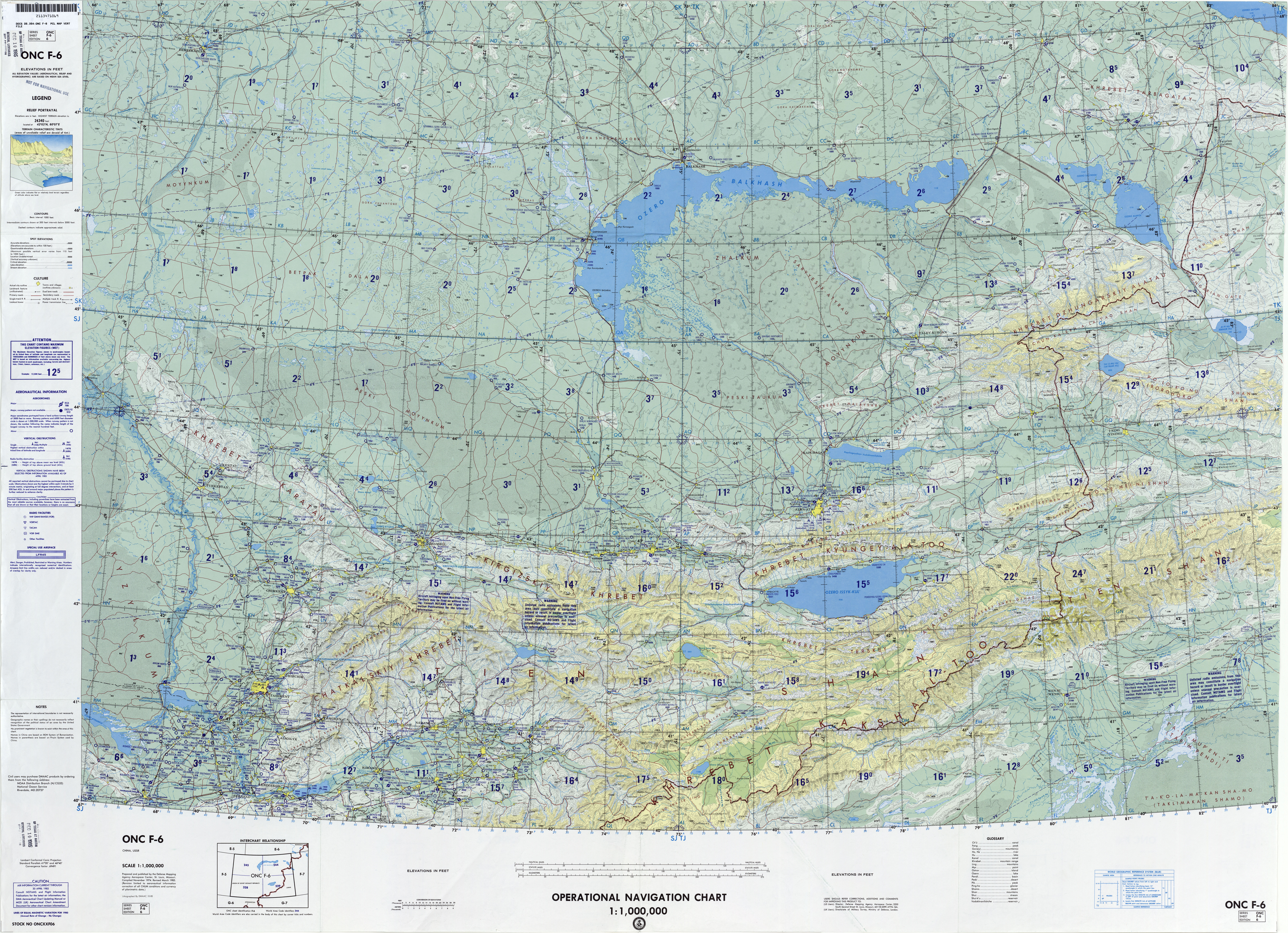

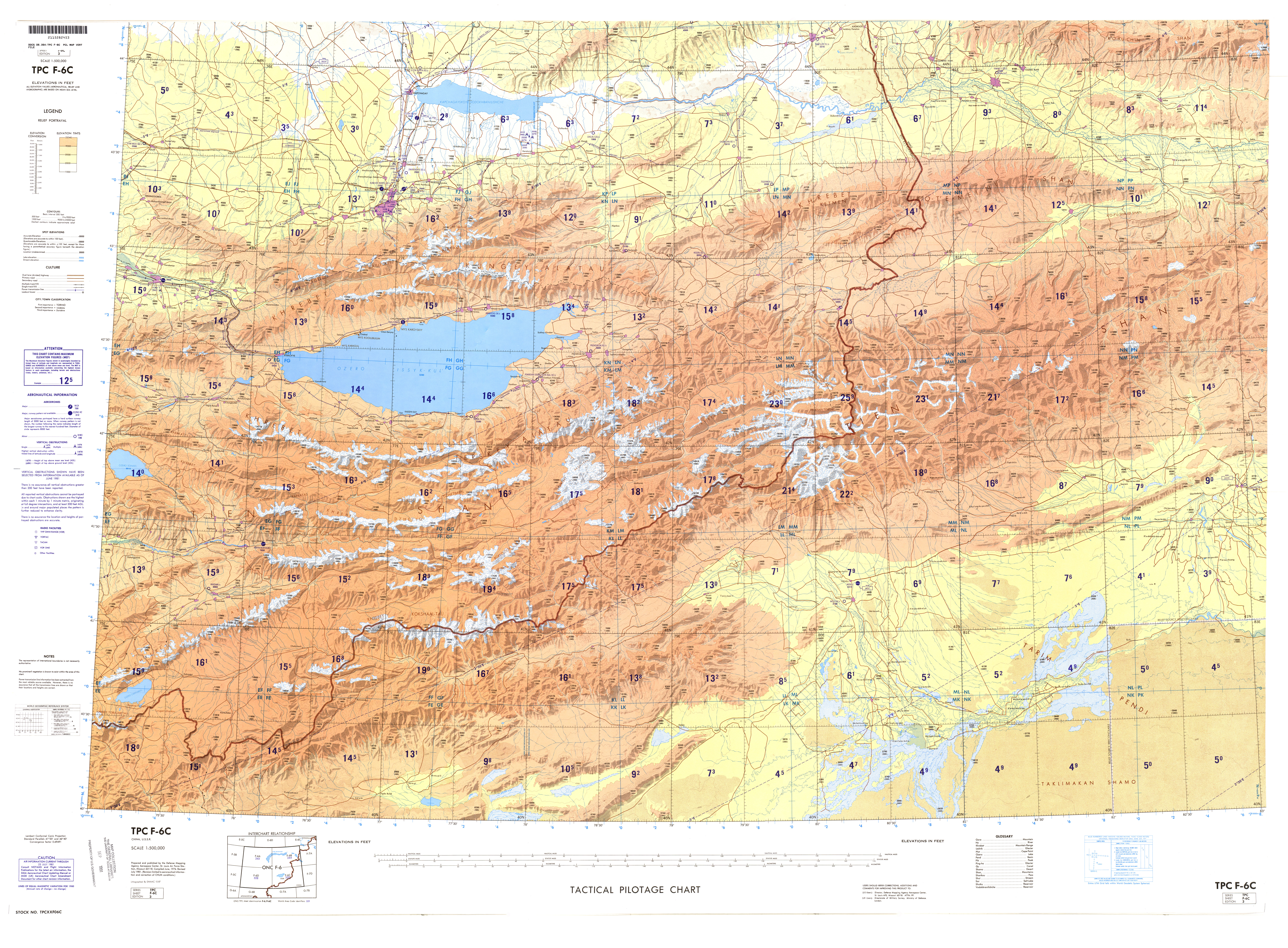

== See also ==
- List of ultras of Central Asia
