= Bat Khan Mountain =

Mountain in Töv Province, Mongolia

- Location within Mongolia

Highest point
- Elevation: 2,178 m (7,146 ft)
- Coordinates: 47°9′9″N 104°10′7″E | topo = | type = | age = | last_eruption = | first_ascent = | easiest_route =

Geography
- Location: Mongolia

The Bat Khan Mountain (Mongolian: Бат хаан уул, lit. "firm khan mountain") is a mountain in the Erdenesant, Töv Province in Mongolia. It has an elevation of 2,178 m (7,146 ft). The mountain is a regional sacred mountain in Mongolia.
