= Tsambagarav =

Mountain in Mongolia

- Tsast Uul
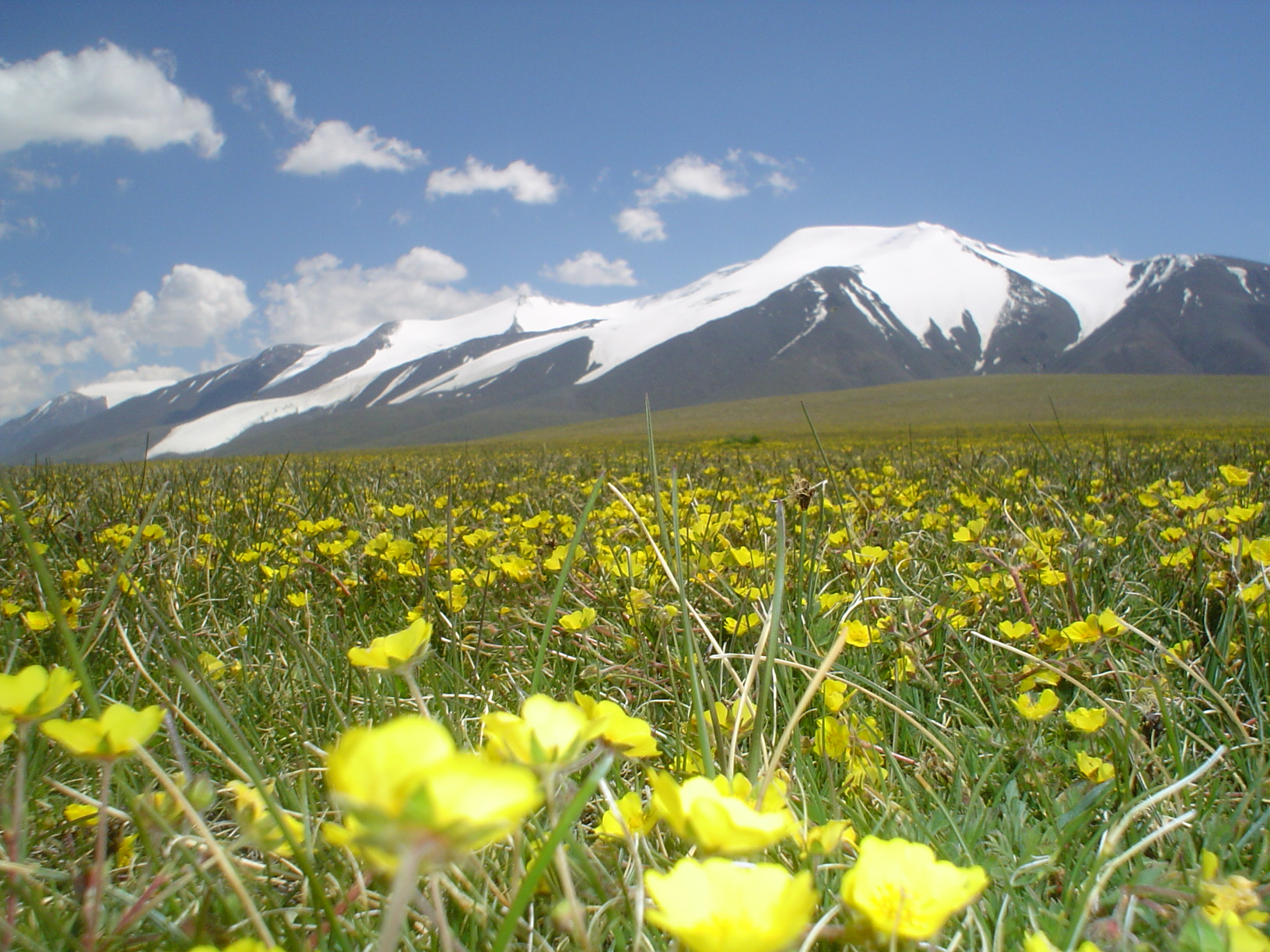
- Tsambagarav Mountain in July

Highest point
- Elevation: 4,193 m (13,757 ft)
- Prominence: 1,757 m (5,764 ft)
- Listing: Ultra, Ribu
- Coordinates: 48°40′54″N 90°43′30″E

Geography
- Location within Mongolia
- Location: Mongolia
- Parent range: Mongol-Altai Mountains

Tsambagarav (Mongolian: Цамбагарав, ᠴᠠᠮᠪᠠᠭᠠᠷᠪᠤ) is a mountain between Khovd Province and Bayan-Ölgii Province in western Mongolia, it is a mountain of the Altai Mountains range. It has two peaks, its highest peak "Tsast Uul" (Mongolian: Цаст, lit. "snow-covered peak") has an elevation of 4,193 metres (13,757 ft) and another peak same named "Tsambagarav" (48.655196,90.847063). The mountain is the stand-alone eternally snow-capped mountain of the Mongol Altai and the regional sacred mountain in Mongolia.

Italians Gianni Pais Becher, Gastone Lorenzini and Elziro Molin summited Tsast Uul and Tsambagarav in western Mongolia in June and July 1992 with Mongolians Jndonpuncav, Gotov, Samubun and Battulga.

== See also ==
- Tsambagarav Uul National Park
- List of mountains in Mongolia
- List of ultras of Central Asia
