= Öndör Khairkhan Mountain =

Mountain in Bayan-Ölgii, Mongolia

Öndör Khairkhan
- Location within Mongolia

Highest point
- Elevation: 3,914 m (12,841 ft)
- Coordinates: 48°20′16.4″N 88°36′15.5″E

Geography
- Location: Bayan-Ölgii, Mongolia
- Parent range: Mongol-Altai Mountains

The Öndör Khairkhan Mountain (Mongolian: Өндөр Хайрхан уул, high holy mountain) is a mountain of the Altai Mountains and located in the Bayan-Ölgii Province in Mongolia. It has elevation of 3,914 m (12,841 ft) and permanently snow-capped.
