= Belukha Mountain =

Highest peak of the Altai Mountains in Russia

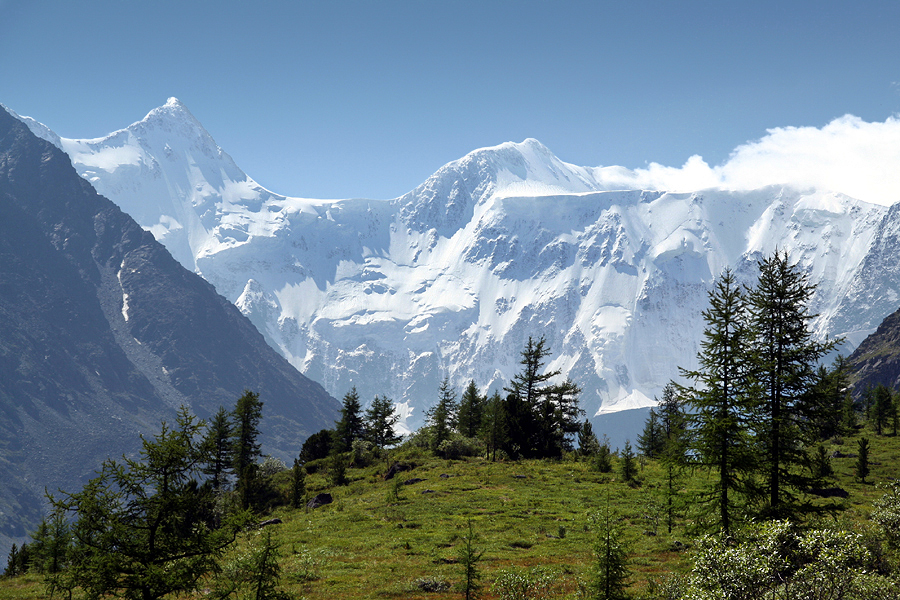
- The Belukha massif in the Altai Mountains, as seen from Russia in 2006.

Highest point
- Elevation: 4,509 m (14,793 ft)
- Prominence: 3,345 m (10,974 ft); Ranked 59th
- Listing: Ultra, Ribu
- Coordinates: 49°48′27″N 86°35′24″E

Geography
- Location within Russia Location within Altai Republic Location within Kazakhstan
- Location: Altai Republic, Russia
- Parent range: Altai Mountains

Climbing
- First ascent: 1914 by B. V. Tronov & M. V. Tronov
- Easiest route: basic rock/snow climb

Belukha Mountain (/bəˈluːxə/; Russian: Белуха, IPA: [bʲɪˈɫuxə]) or Üç-Sümer (Altay: Ӱч-Сӱмер [ʏc͡ç sʏˈmer], which translates as "the three peaks") is the highest mountain of the Altai Mountains and the highest of the South Siberian Mountains system. It is part of the Golden Mountains of Altai World Heritage Site.

== Geography ==
Belukha is a multi-peaked massif that rises along the border of Russia (specifically the Altai Republic) and Kazakhstan (specifically the East Kazakhstan Region), just a few dozen miles north of the China-Kazakhstan-Russia tripoint. There are several small glaciers on the massif, including Belukha Glacier. The highest peaks of the Belukha massif range from about 4,350 meters to just over 4,500 meters in elevation.

== History ==
Belukha was first climbed in 1914 by the Tronov brothers. Most ascents of the eastern peak follow the same southern route as that taken in the first ascent. Though the Altai is lower in elevation than other Asian mountain groups, it is very remote, and much time and planning are required for its approach.

In the summer of 2001, a team of scientists traveled to the remote Belukha Glacier to assess the feasibility of extracting ice cores at the site. Research was carried out from 2001 to 2003: both shallow cores and cores to bedrock were extracted and analyzed (Olivier and others, 2003; Fujita and others, 2004). Based on tritium dating techniques, the deeper cores may contain as much as 3,000–5,000 years of climatic and environmental records. A Swiss-Russian team also studied the glacier.

== Access ==
Since 2008, one is required to apply for a special border zone permit in order to be allowed into the area (if travelling independently without using an agency). Foreigners should apply for the permit to their regional FSB border guard office two months before the planned date.

== See also ==
- List of highest points of Russian federal subjects
- List of Altai mountains
- List of ultras of Central Asia
- List of glaciers of Russia
