= Sutai Mountain =

Mountain in Mongolia

Sutai
- Sutay Uul
- Location within Mongolia

Highest point
- Elevation: 4,220 m (13,850 ft)
- Prominence: 1,787 m (5,863 ft)
- Listing: Ultra
- Coordinates: 46°37′03″N 93°35′39″E

Geography
- Location: Mongolia
- Parent range: Gobi-Altai Mountains

Sutai (Mongolian: Сутай хайрхан уул, Sutai khairkhan uul) is a mountain between Govi-Altai Province and Khovd Province in western Mongolia. It is the highest mountain of the Gobi-Altai Mountains with an elevation of 4,220 metres (13,845 ft).

== See also ==
- List of mountains in Mongolia
- List of ultras of Central Asia
