= Beltir (village) =

Beltir Бельтир
- Village
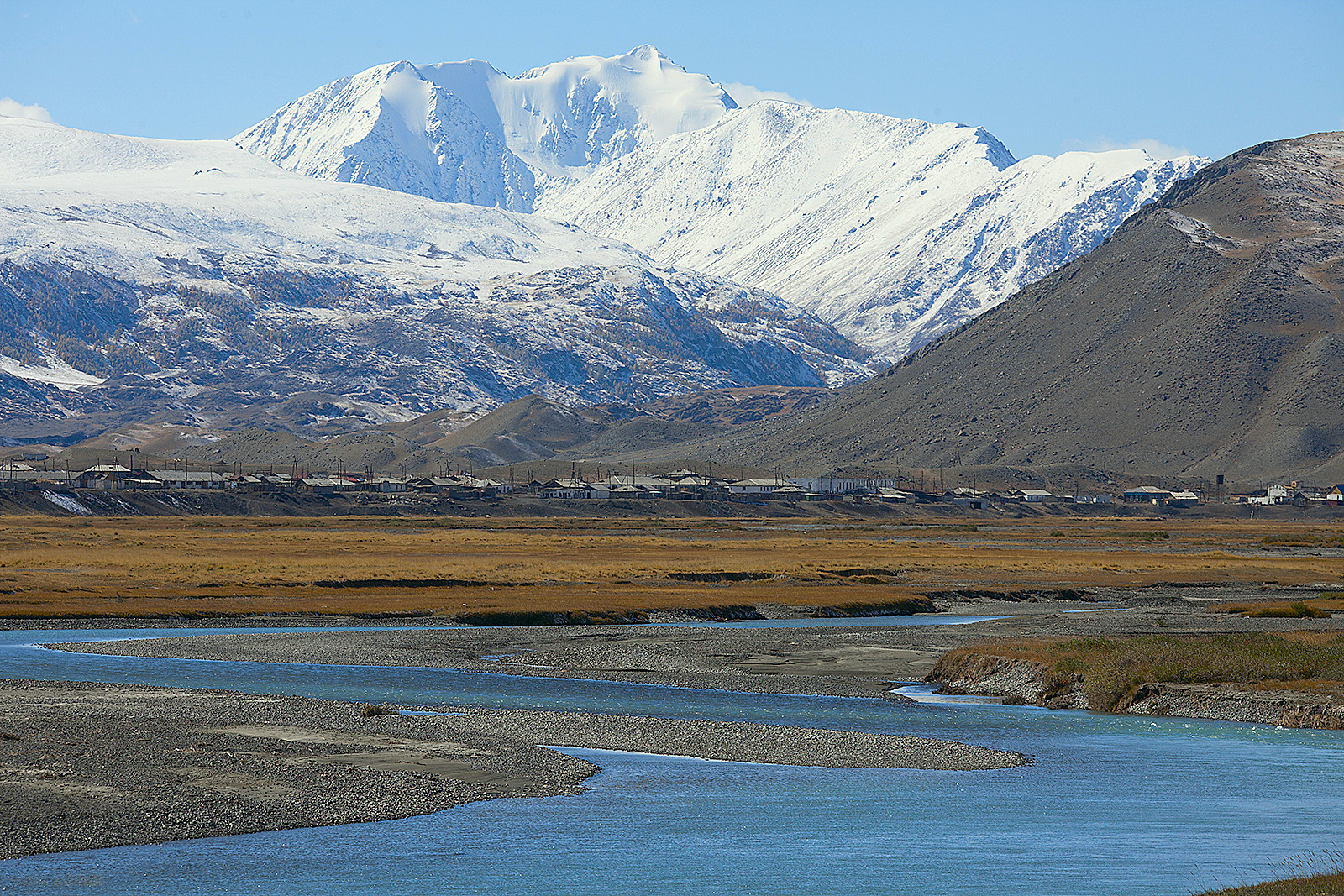

- Location within Altai Republic Location within Russia
- Coordinates: 49°58′N 88°10′E
- Country: Russia
- Region: Altai Republic
- District: Kosh-Agachsky District
- Time zone: UTC+7:00

Beltir (Russian: Бельтир; Altay: Белтир, Beltir) is a rural locality (a selo) in Beltirskoye Rural Settlement of Kosh-Agachsky District, the Altai Republic, Russia. The population was 77 as of 2016. There are 10 streets.

== Geography ==
Beltir is located at the confluence of the rivers Chagan and Taldur, 43 km west of Kosh-Agach (the district's administrative centre) by road. Ortolyk is the nearest rural locality.

== 2003 Altai earthquake ==
In 2003, an earthquake measuring M_{w}7.3 struck the region, destroying the village.
