= Ikh Bogd =

Mountain in Bayankhongor, Mongolia

- Location within Mongolia

Highest point
- Elevation: 3,957 m (12,982 ft)
- Prominence: 1,979 m (6,493 ft)
- Listing: Ultra, Ribu
- Coordinates: 44°59′42″N 100°13′51″E

Geography
- Location: Mongolia
- Parent range: Gobi-Altai Mountains

Ikh Bogd (Mongolian: Их Богд, lit. "great saint"), also known as Tergun Bogd, is the highest mountain of the Gobi-Altai Mountains, located in Bayankhongor Province, Mongolia. It has an elevation of 3,957 metres (12,982 ft).

== See also ==
- List of mountains in Mongolia
- List of ultras of Central Asia
