= Burkhan Buudai =

- Location within Mongolia

Highest point
- Elevation: 3,765 m (12,352 ft)
- Coordinates: 45°40′29″N 96°45′1″E

Geography
- Location: Mongolia
- Parent range: Gobi-Altai Mountains

Burkhan Buudai (Mongolian: Бурхан буудай уул, divinity mountain) is a mountain of the Gobi-Altai Mountains and located in the Govi-Altai Province in Mongolia. It has elevation of 3,765 metres (12,352 ft).
