= Ulba =

River in Kazakhstan

Coordinates: 49°57′02″N 82°35′04″E

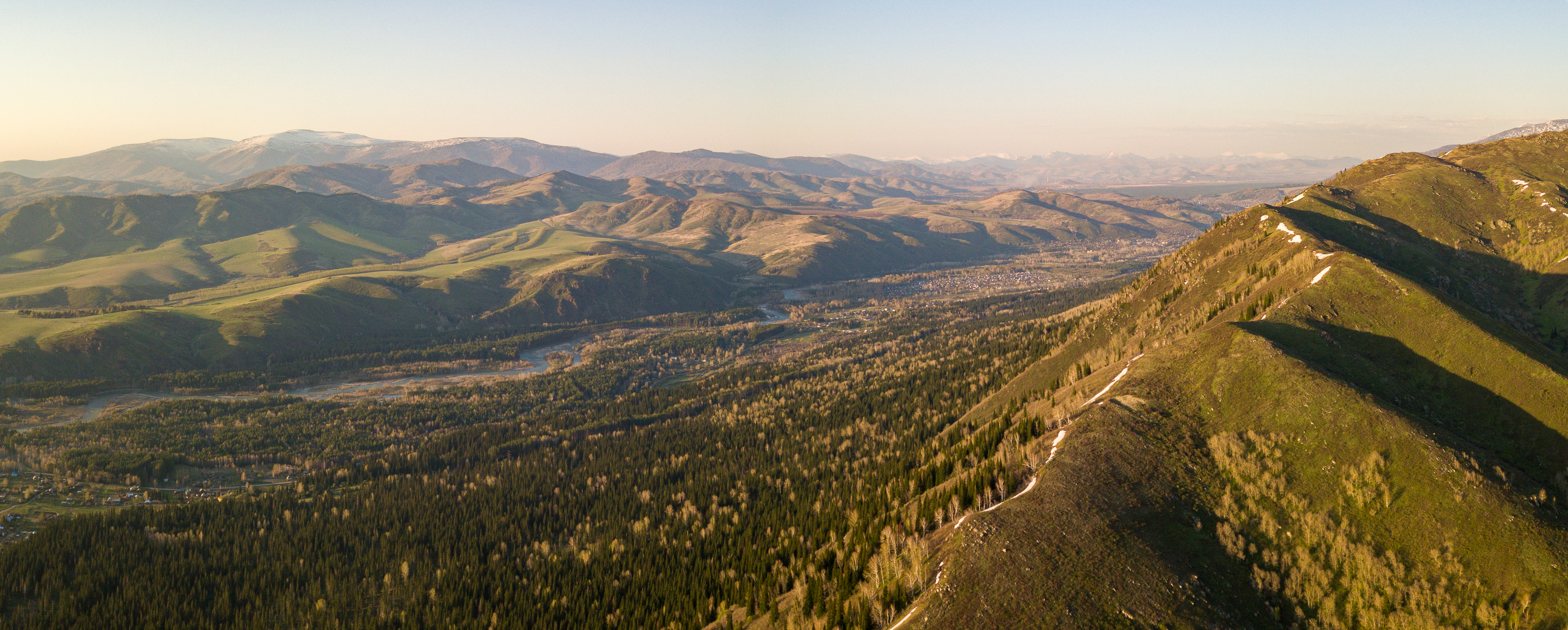

The Ulba (Kazakh: ءۇلبى, Үлбі, Ülbı; Russian: Ульба) is a river of Kazakhstan. It joins the Irtysh at Oskemen.
