= Aj Bogd =

Mountain range in western Mongolia

Aj Bogd Mountain Range
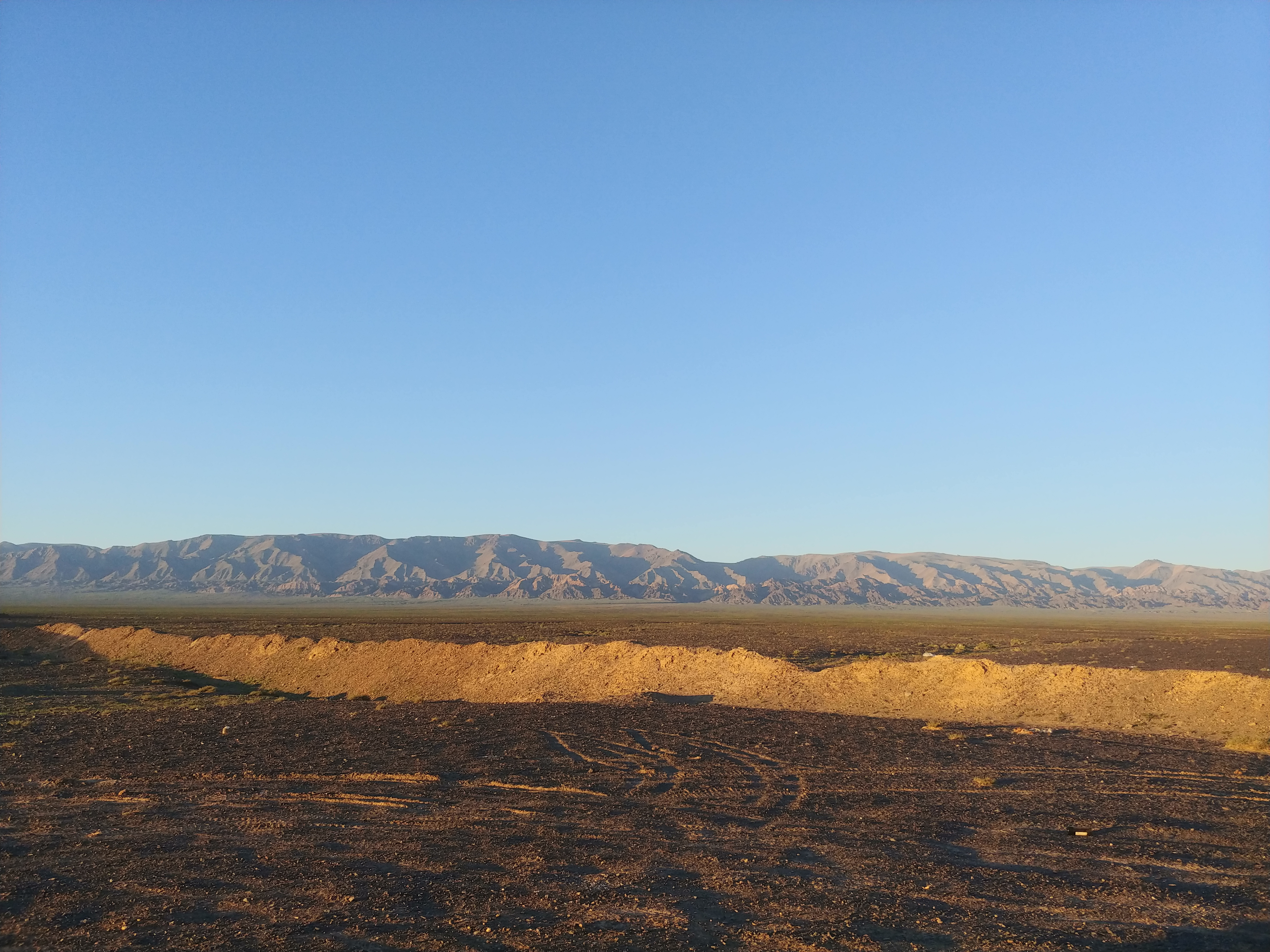
- Aj Bogd Mountain Range viewed from Altai soum

Highest point
- Elevation: 3,802 m (12,474 ft)
- Prominence: 2,132 m (6,995 ft)
- Coordinates: 44°47′57″N 95°14′24″E

Naming
- Native name: Аж Богдын нуруу

Geography
- Location within Mongolia
- Location: Govi-Altai Province, Mongolia
- Parent range: Mongolian Altai

Aj Bogd Mountain Range (Аж Богдын нуруу) is a major branch mountain system of the Mongolian Altai Mountains in western Mongolia. It forms one of the prominent southern offshoots of the Altai mountain system and is characterized by high elevations, strong tectonic control, and deeply dissected relief.

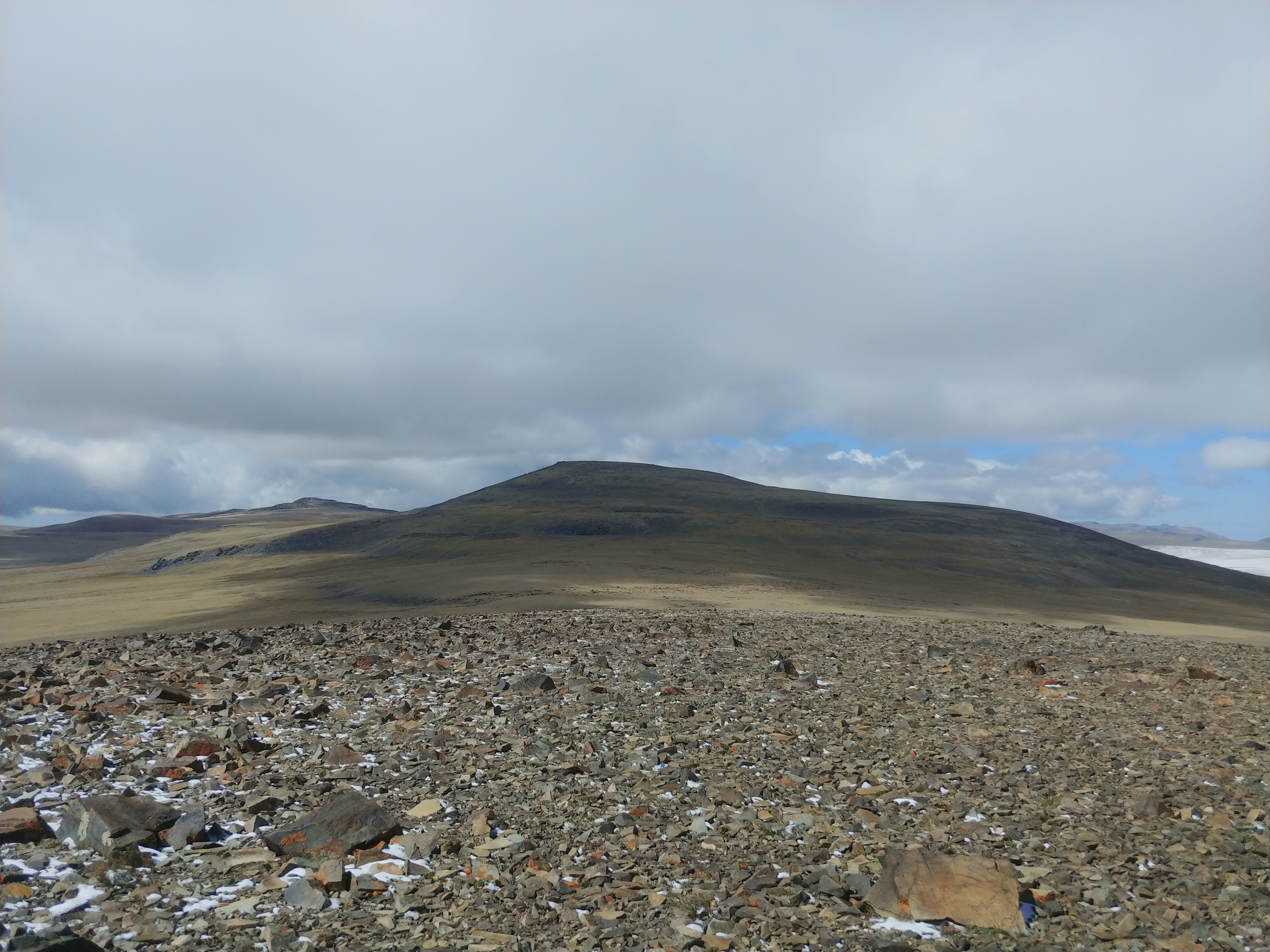
Khuren Tovon Peak in the Aj Bogd Mountain Range

== Geography ==
The Aj Bogd Mountain Range lies along the southwestern margin of the central Mongolian Altai and trends northwest–southeast. It is bounded by Zoolon Bogd Pass and the Alag Lake depression to the north, by the Ikh Tayan Range and the Tukhum Valley to the west, and by Nomingiin Gobi and Khonin Us Gobi to the south and southwest.

The range occupies approximately 931,800 ha (about 9,318 km²) and its boundary length is about 446 km. Aj Bogd extends roughly 87 km in length, with a width varying from about 31.3 km to 83 km. The average elevation is about 2,900 m.

== Topography ==
Aj Bogd is a high-mountain system with steep slopes, narrow gorges, and extensive piedmont zones formed by erosion and accumulation under arid conditions. Ridge crests are commonly flat or dome-shaped, interpreted as uplifted ancient planation surfaces.

The range’s highest summit is Ikh Ovoo (3,802.3 m). Several other peaks exceed 3,000 m, including Teregtiin Ridge, Ikh Oim, Baga Oim, and Zagalin Ovoo. Evidence of Quaternary glaciation is reported, especially in the higher western parts of the range, including glacially shaped landforms and high-altitude lakes.

== Geology ==
Aj Bogd is composed mainly of Paleozoic rocks, dominated by Devonian and Carboniferous formations, including sedimentary and volcanic sequences and intrusive bodies (e.g., granite, diorite, granodiorite). The range is structurally controlled by major faults, including a long fault zone exceeding 160 km along the western flank, and additional longitudinal and transverse fault sets associated with intermontane valleys and circular uplift structures.

== Climate ==
The climate is cold and arid with strong continental variability.

- Mean annual temperature: about −2 °C
- January mean: about −20 °C (absolute minimum to −42 °C)
- July mean: about 16 °C (absolute maximum to 29.7 °C)
- Annual precipitation: about 200–250 mm (mainly in summer)
- Snow cover: about 100 days

Annual sunshine duration is reported at about 2,800 hours.

== Hydrology ==
Aj Bogd functions as a local watershed. Rivers originate from high ridges, wetlands, springs, and ridge-top lakes, with discharge dominated by snowmelt and rainfall (about 60–70% of total). Reported rivers include Idəriin Gol, Bayan Gol, Urt Gol, Ar Zuslangiin Gol, Gishüünt Gol, Ikh Gol, and Baga Gol, many of which are short and deeply incised and often terminate in internal basins where flow infiltrates or evaporates.

== Landscapes, soils, flora and fauna ==
Mountain steppe landscapes dominate the range. Soils include mountain dark chestnut and related steppe/desert-steppe soils, with saline-affected soils in lower areas. Vegetation is described as mountain-steppe grass–forb communities with numerous medicinal and economically useful plants. The fauna includes argali, Siberian ibex, snow leopard, wolf, fox, lynx, and raptors such as eagles and vultures.

== Scientific significance ==
Aj Bogd is used as a representative example of a southern branch range of the Mongolian Altai shaped by tectonic uplift, arid-climate erosion, and Quaternary glaciation, and is relevant for geomorphological and landscape-zonation studies in western Mongolia.
