= Altai Mountains =

Mountain range in Central–East Asia

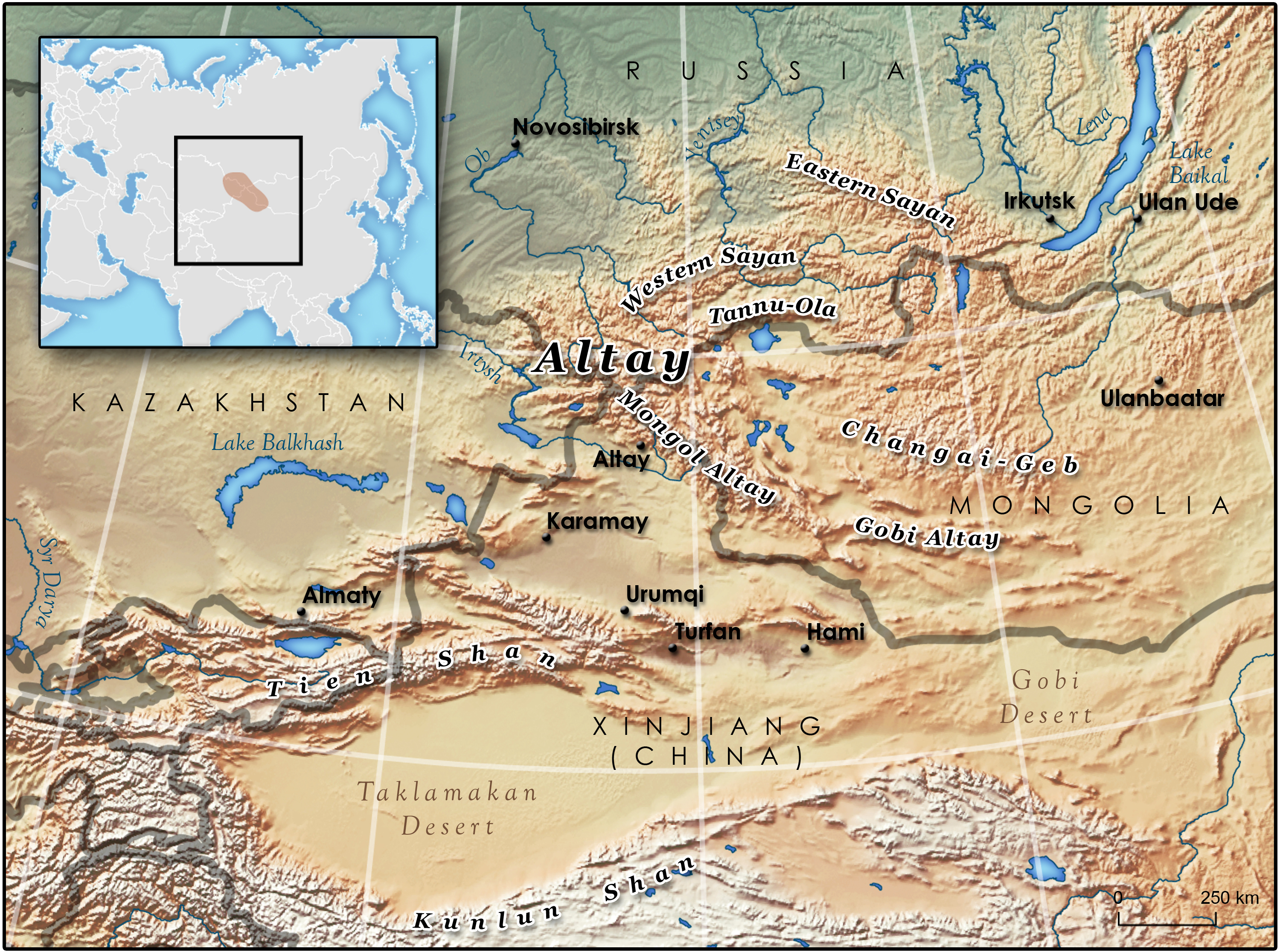
Map of the Altai mountain range

The Altai Mountains (/ɑːlˈtaɪ/ ahl-TY) are a mountain range in Central Asia, where Russia, China, Mongolia, and Kazakhstan converge, and where the rivers Irtysh and Ob have their headwaters. The highest summit of the range is Belukha, whose summit reaches 4,506 m (14,783 ft) above sea level. The massif merges with the Sayan Mountains in the northeast, and gradually becomes lower in the southeast, where it merges into the high plateau of the Gobi Desert. In the southwest, it is separated from the higher Tian Shan range by the Junggar Basin. It spans from about 45° to 52° N and from about 84° to 99° E.

The region is inhabited by a sparse but ethnically diverse population, including Turkic peoples, Mongols, and Volga Germans, though predominantly represented by indigenous ethnic minorities of semi-nomadic people. The local economy is based on bovine, sheep, horse husbandry, hunting, agriculture, forestry, and mining. The now discredited Altaic language family takes its name from this mountain range.

ᠠᠯᠲᠠᠢ ‍ᠶ᠋ᠢᠨ
ᠨᠢᠷᠤᠭᠤ
Name in
Mongolian
language and script,
altai-yin niruɣu

== Etymology and modern names ==
Altai is derived from underlying form *altañ "gold, golden" (compare Old Turkic 𐰞𐱃𐰆𐰣 altun "gold, golden") with coda -ñ underlying the -n & -y correspondence among cognates in different Turkic languages & dialects (e.g. qōñ ~ qoy "sheep", Qitan ~ Qitay "Khitans", etc.), as well as in Mongolian.

The mountains are called Altain nuruu (Алтайн нуруу) in Khalkha Mongolian, altai-yin niruɣu in Chakhar Mongolian, and Altay tuular (Алтай туулар) in the Altay language. They are also called Altaı taýlary or التاي تاۋلارى in Kazakh; Altajskije gory (Алтайские горы) in Russian; Altay Taghliri (ئالتاي تاغلىرى or Алтай Тағлири) in Uyghur; ā'ěrtài shānmài in Chinese (阿尔泰山脉 simplified, 阿爾泰山脈 traditional, or اَعَرتَىْ شًامَىْ in Xiao'erjing); and Arteː shanmeː (Артэ Шанмэ) in Dungan.

== Geography ==
The Altai Mountains are a system of remote mountains in central Asia that cover an area of 845,000 km^{2} (326,000 sq mi). The mountains stretch for 2,525 km (1,569 mi) from northwest to southeast.

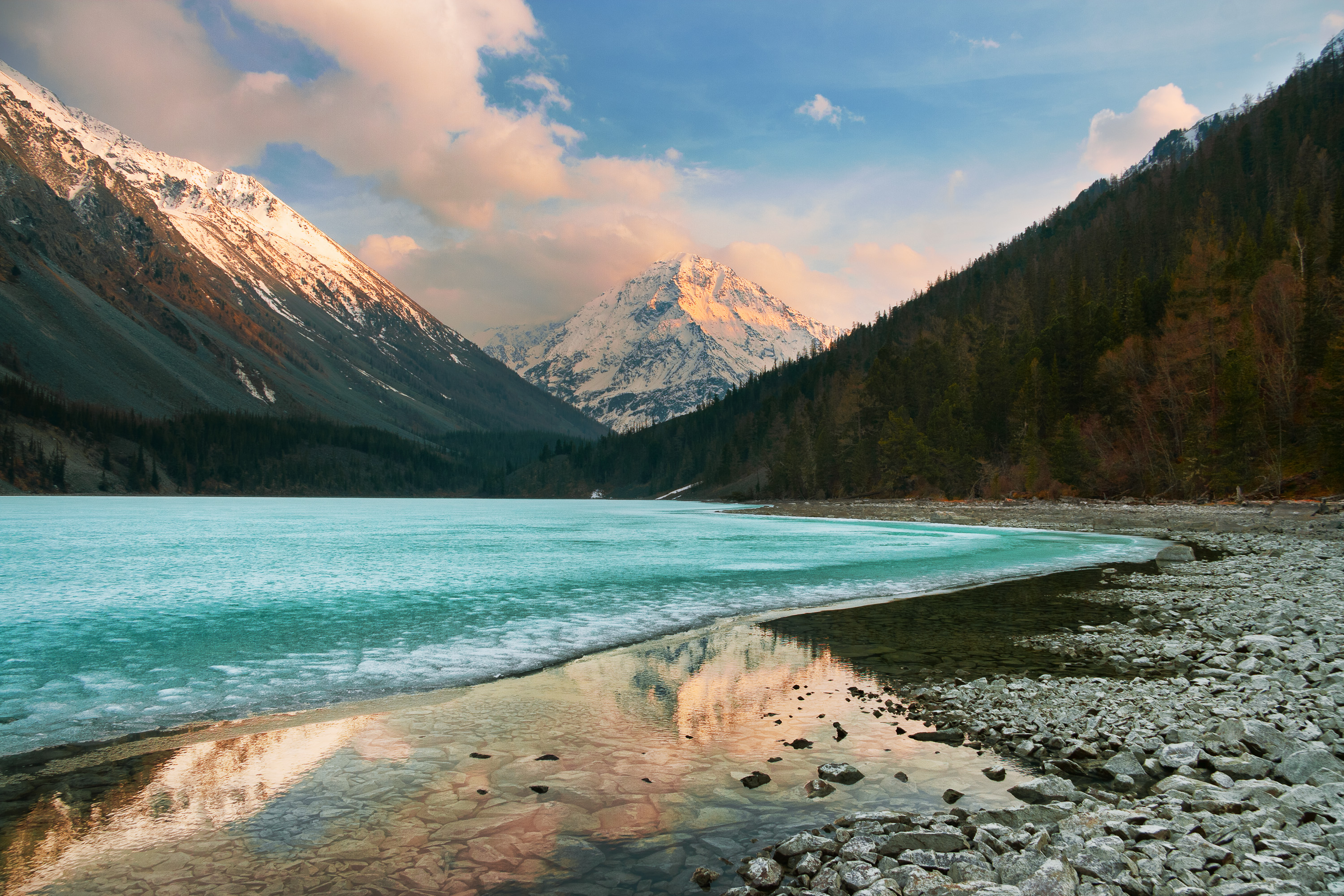
Lake Kucherla in the Altai Mountains

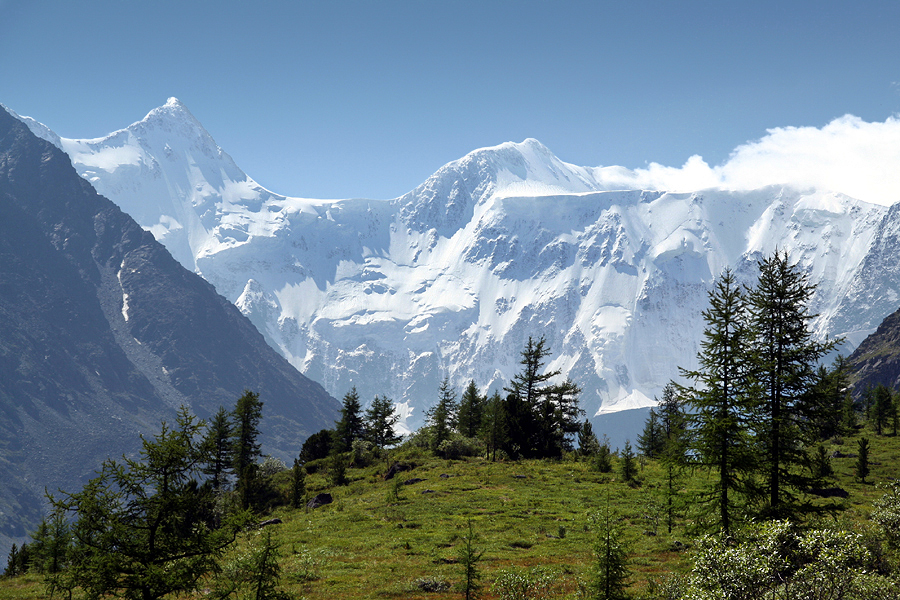
Belukha mountain

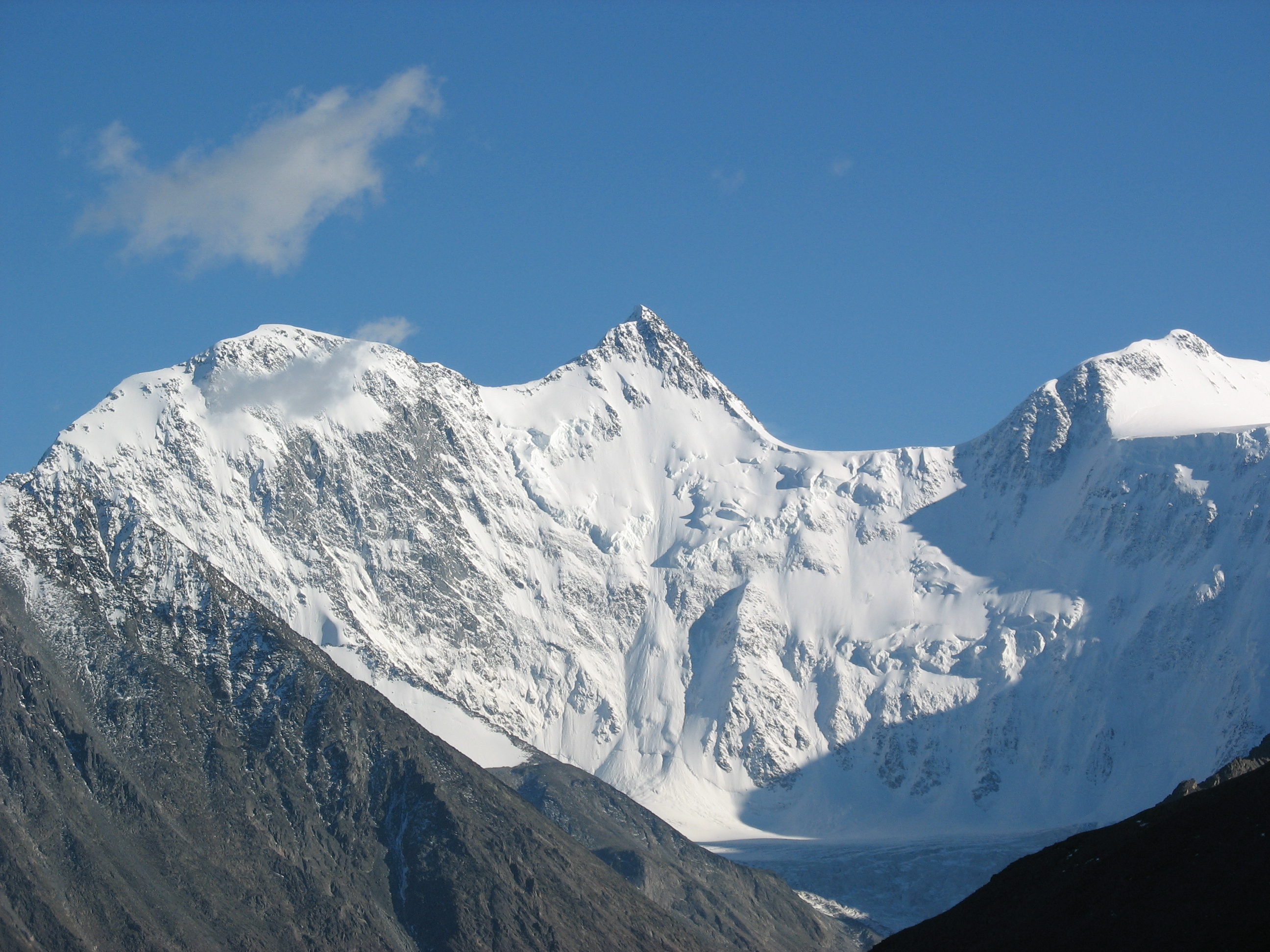
Belukha, the highest mountain in Altay

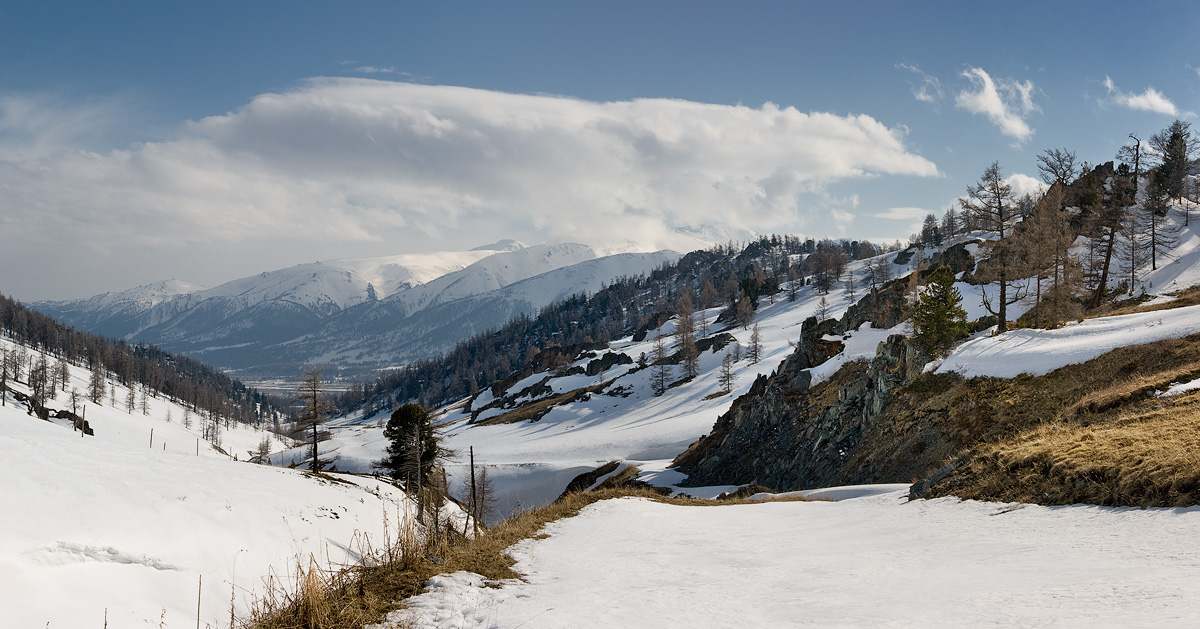
Altay Mountains, Kazakhstan

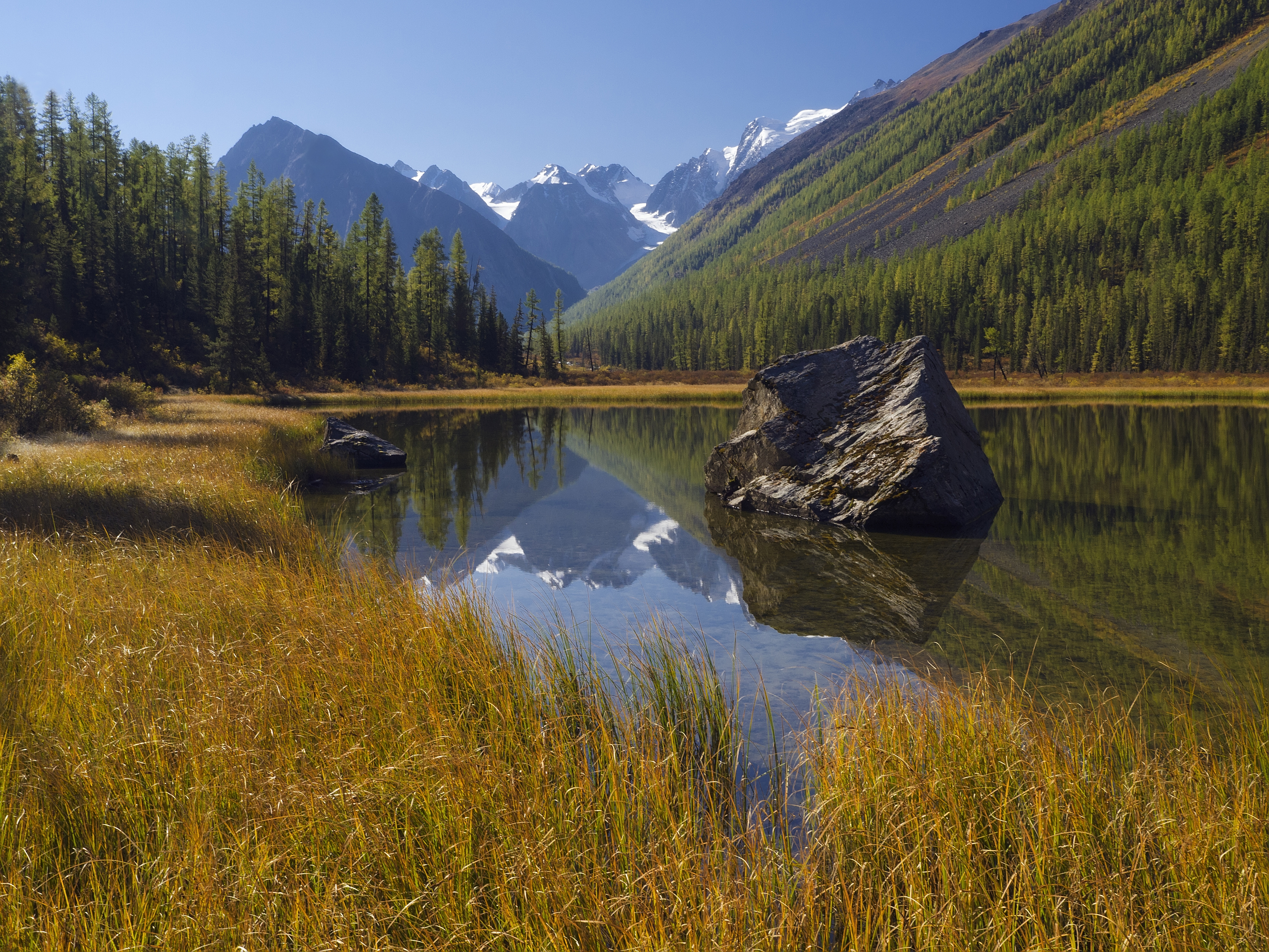
Shavlo Lake in Northern Chuysky Range.

In the north of the region is the Sailughem Mountains, also known as Kolyvan Altai, which stretch northeast from 49° N and 86° E towards the western extremity of the Sayan Mountains in 51° 60' N and 89° E. Their mean elevation is 1,500–1,750 m (4,920–5,740 ft). The snow-line runs at 2,000 m (6,600 ft) on the northern side and at 2,400 m (7,900 ft) on the southern, and above it the peaks rise some 1,000 m (3,300 ft) higher. Mountain passes across the range are few and difficult, the chief being the Ulan-daban at 2,827 m (9,275 ft) (or 2,879 m (9,446 ft) according to Kozlov), and the Chapchan-daban, at 3,217 m (10,554 ft), in the south and north respectively. On the east and southeast this range is flanked by the plateau of Mongolia, the transition being affected gradually by means of several minor plateaus, such as Ukok (2,380 m (7,810 ft)) with Pazyryk Valley, Chuya (1,830 m (6,000 ft)), Kendykty (2,500 m (8,200 ft)), and Kak (2,520 m (8,270 ft)), (2,590 m (8,500 ft)), and (2,410 m (7,910 ft)).

This region is studded with large lakes, e.g. Uvs 720 m (2,360 ft) above sea level, Khyargas, Dorgon and Khar 1,170 m (3,840 ft), and traversed by various mountain ranges, of which the principal are the Tannu-Ola Mountains, running roughly parallel with the Sayan Mountains as far east as the Kosso-gol, and the Khan Khökhii mountains, also stretching west and east.

The north western and northern slopes of the Sailughem Mountains are extremely steep and difficult to access. On this side lies the highest summit of the range, the double-headed Belukha, whose summits reach 4,506 m (14,783 ft) and 4,400 m (14,400 ft) respectively, and give origin to several glaciers and glaciokarst formations (30 km^{2} (12 sq mi) in aggregate area, as of 1911). Altaians call it Kadyn Bazhy, but is also called Uch-Sumer. The second highest peak of the range is in Mongolian part and is named Khüiten Peak. This peak reaches 4,374 m (14,350 ft). Numerous spurs, striking in all directions from the Sailughem mountains, fill up the space between that range and the lowlands of Tomsk. These include the Chuya Belki, having an average elevation of 2,700 m (8,900 ft), with summits from 3,500–4,177 m (11,483–13,704 ft) and several glaciers on their northern slope; the Katun Belki, which have a mean elevation of about 3,000 m (9,800 ft) and are mostly snow-clad; the Kholzun range; the Korgon, highest point Mayak Shangina, the Talitsk and Selitsk ranges; as well as the Tigeretsk Range.

Several secondary plateaus of lower elevations are also distinguished by geographers. The Valley of the Katun river begins as a gorge on the south-west slope of Belukha; then, after a big bend, the river (600 km (370 mi) long) pierces the Katun Belki, and enters a wider valley, lying at an elevation of 600–1,100 m (2,000–3,600 ft), which it follows until it emerges from the Altai highlands to join the Biya River. Here, the two rivers merge to form the Ob River.

The next valley is that of the Charysh, which has the Korgon and Tigeretsk Range on one side and the Talitsk and Baschelaksk Range (Бащелакский хребет) on the other. This valley includes the small but deep Kolyvan Lake at an altitude of 360 m (1,180 ft), which is surrounded by granite domes and towers.

Farther west the valleys of the Uba, the Ulba and the Bukhtarma open south-westwards towards the Irtysh. The lower part of the first, like the lower valley of the Charysh, is heavily populated; in the valley of the Ulba is the Riddersk mine, at the foot of the Ivanovsk Peak (2,060 m (6,760 ft)). The valley of the Bukhtarma, which has a length of 320 km (200 mi), also has its origin at the foot of the Belukha and the Kuitun peaks, and it falls some 1,500 m (4,900 ft) in about 3,000 km (1,900 mi), from an alpine plateau at an elevation of 1,900 m (6,200 ft) to the Bukhtarma fortress (345 m (1,132 ft)). Its upper parts have glaciers, the best known of which is the Berel, which descends from the Belukha. On the northern side of the range which separates the upper Bukhtarma from the upper Katun is the Katun glacier, which after two ice-falls widen out to 700–900 m (2,300–3,000 ft).

The middle and lower parts of the Bukhtarma valley have been colonized since the 18th century by runaway Russian peasants, serfs, and religious schismatics (Raskolniks), who created a free republic there on Chinese territory. After this part of the valley was annexed to Russia in 1869, it was rapidly colonized. The high valleys farther north, on the same western face of the Sailughem range, are lightly populated, mostly by Kyrgyz shepherds.

The areas of the Bashkaus, Chulyshman, and Chulcha, all three leading to the alpine lake of Teletskoye (length, 80 km (50 mi); maximum width, 5 km (3.1 mi); elevation, 520 m (1,710 ft); area, 230.8 km^{2} (89.1 sq mi); maximum depth, 310 m (1,020 ft); mean depth, 200 m (660 ft)), are inhabited by Telengit people. The shores of the lake rise almost sheer to over 1,800 m (5,900 ft). From this lake issues the Biya, which joins the Katun at Biysk, and then meanders through the prairies north-west of the Altai.

Farther north the Altai highlands is the Kuznetsk district, which has a slightly different geological aspect, but belongs to the Altai system. The Abakan River, which rises on the western shoulder of the Sayan mountains, belongs to the system of the Yenisei. The Kuznetsk Ala-tau range, on the left bank of the Abakan, runs north-east into the government of Yeniseisk, while a complex of mountains (Chukchut, Salair, Abakan) fills up the country northwards towards the Trans-Siberian Railway and westwards towards the Ob.

The Ek-tagh or Mongolian Altai, which separates the Khovd basin on the north from the Irtysh basin on the south, is a true border-range, in that it rises in a steep and lofty escarpment from the Dzungarian depression (470–900 m (1,540–2,950 ft)), but descends on the north by a relatively short slope to the plateau (1,150–1,680 m (3,770–5,510 ft)) of north-western Mongolia. East of 94° E the range is continued by a double series of mountain chains, all of which exhibit less sharply marked orographical features and are at considerably lower elevations. The slopes of the constituent chains of the system are inhabited principally by nomadic Kyrgyz.

The five highest mountains of the Altai are:

- Belukha Mountain (Russia and Kazakhstan), 4,506 m (14,783 ft)
- Khüiten Peak (Mongolia and China), 4,374 m (14,350 ft)
- Mönkhkhairkhan Mountain (Mongolia), 4,204 m (13,793 ft)
- Sutai Mountain (Mongolia), 4,220 m (13,850 ft)
- Tsambagarav Mountain (Mongolia), 4,195 m (13,763 ft)

== Fauna ==
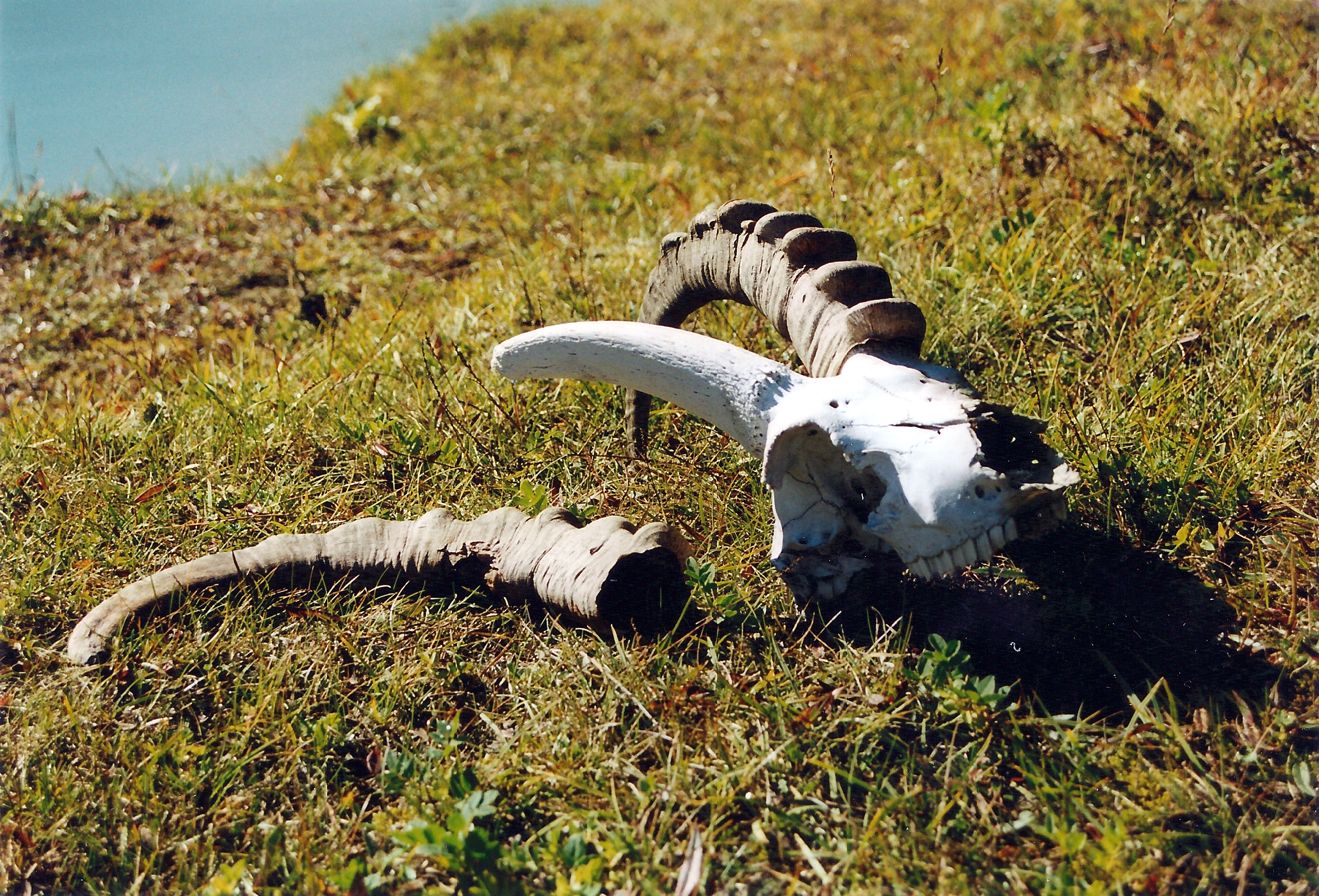
Skull of a Siberian ibex, found near the Belukha

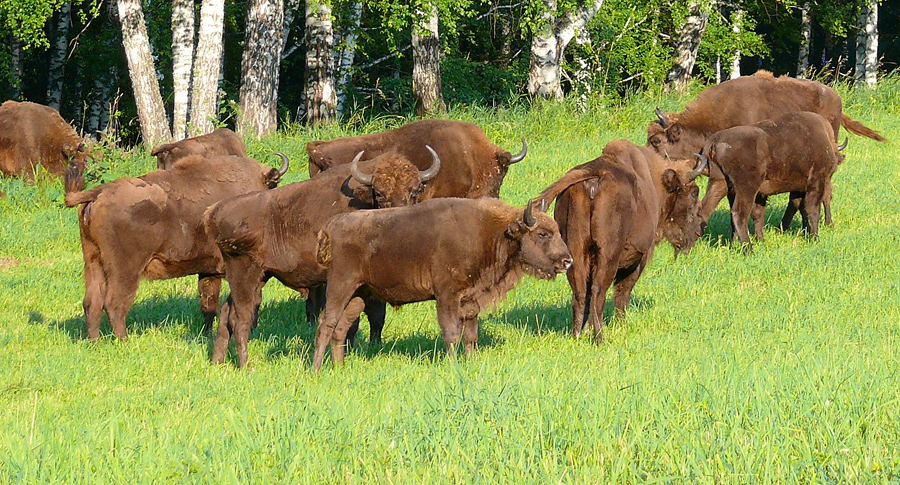
Wisent herd at a nursery of the Russian Academy of Sciences in the Russian Altai (Shebalinsky District, Altai Republic)

The Altai-Sayan ecoregion is located at the intersection of the Central Asian and Siberian faunal provinces.

The Altai mountains are home to a diverse fauna, because of its different habitats, like steppes, northern taigas and alpine vegetation. Steep slopes are home to the Siberian ibex (Capra sibirica), whereas the rare argali (Ovis ammon) is found on more gentle slopes. Deer are represented by five species: Altai wapiti (Cervus elaphus sibiricus), moose (Alces alces), forest reindeer (Rangifer tarandus valentinae), Siberian musk deer (Moschus moschiferus), and Siberian roe deer (Capreolus pygargus). Moose and reindeer however, are restricted to the northern parts of the mountain range. The wild boar (Sus scrofa) is found in the lower foothills and surrounding lowlands. Until recently, the Mongolian gazelle (Procapra gutturosa) was found in the Russian Altai mountains, more specifically in the Chuya River steppe close to the Mongolian border. Large predators are represented by snow leopards (Panthera uncia, syn. Uncia uncia), wolves (Canis lupus), Eurasian lynx (Lynx lynx), and brown bears (Ursus arctos), in the northern parts also by the wolverine (Gulo gulo). The Tien Shan dhole (Cuon alpinus hesperius) (a northwestern subspecies of the Asiatic wild dog) also lived there. Most species of the region are of Mongolian origin. The western Siberian eagle-owl can be found in the western part of the mountains.

Until the 20th century, the Caspian tiger (Panthera tigris tigris) was found in the southern parts of the Altai mountains, where it reached Lake Zaisan and the Black Irtysh. Single individuals were also shot further north, for example close to Barnaul. Closely related to the Caspian tiger is the extant Amur tiger, which has the taxonomic name Panthera tigris altaica.

The wisent was present in the Altai mountains until the Middle Ages, perhaps even until the 18th century. Today, there is a small herd in a nursery in the Altai Republic.

Moor frogs are near bodies of water as high up as 2,000 m (6,600 ft) in the Altai mountains.

== History ==
=== Prehistory ===
The Altai mountains have retained a remarkably stable climate, changing little since the last ice age. In addition the mix of mammals has remained largely the same, with a few exceptions such as extinct mammoths, making it one of the few places on Earth to retain an ice age fauna. Genetic analysis in 2026 also determined that the Altai region served as a likely primary refugium for the woolly rhinoceros, which had originated during the Penultimate Glacial Period, during the warmer period of the Last Interglacial.

The Altai mountains were home to the Denisovan branch of hominids who were contemporaries of Neanderthals and of Homo sapiens (modern humans), descended from Hominids who reached Asia earlier than modern humans. The Denisova hominin, dated to 40,000 years ago, was discovered in the Denisova Cave of the Altai mountains in southern Siberia in 2008. Knowledge of the Denisovan humans derives primarily from DNA evidence and artifacts, as no complete skeletons have yet been recovered. DNA evidence has been unusually well preserved because of the low average temperature in the Denisova caves. Neanderthal bones and tools made by Homo sapiens have also been found in the Denisova Cave, making it the only place in the world where all three hominids are known to have lived.

A dog-like canid from 33,000 years ago was found in the Razboinichya Cave. DNA analysis published in 2013 affirmed that it was more closely related to modern dogs than to wolves.

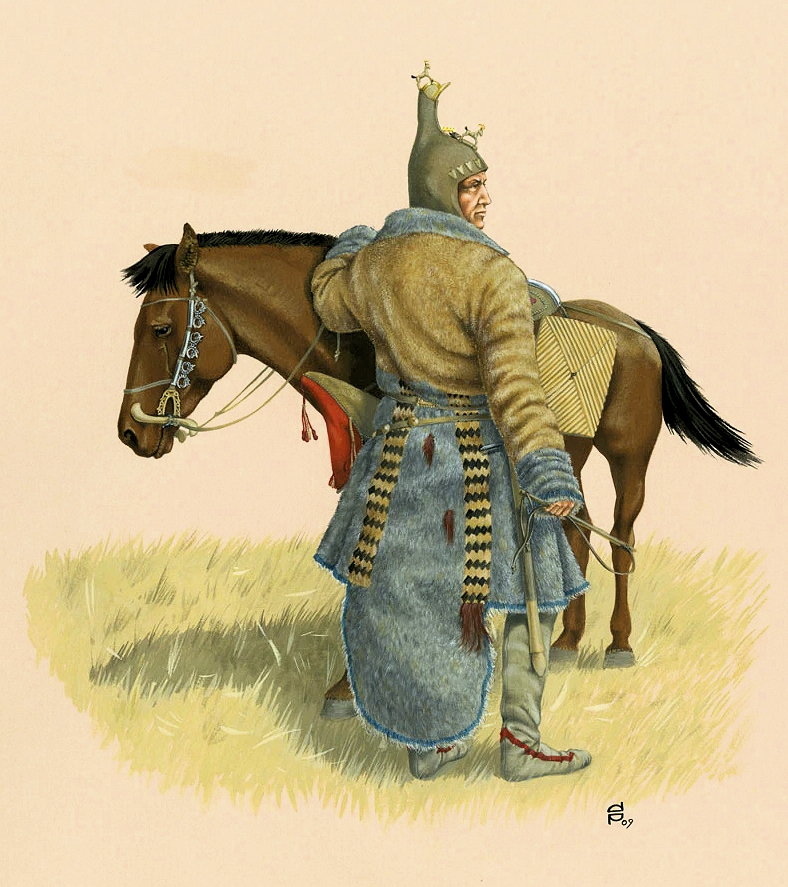
Reconstruction of a Saka Scythian, found in the kurgan Olon-Kurin-Gol 10 in Pazyryk, Altai Mountains, Mongolia

=== Neolithic and Bronze Age ===
The Afanasievans are considered as the earliest herders of East Asia, who were instrumental in the establishment of the long tradition of pastoralism in Mongolia. The Afanasevan population was descended from people who migrated c. 3700–3300 BCE across the Eurasian Steppe from the pre-Yamnaya Repin culture of the Don-Volga region. In the Altai Mountains and to the southeast, Afanasievans seem to have coexisted with the early period of the Chemurchek culture for some time. The Afanasevo culture was replaced by the second wave of Indo-European migrations from the Andronovo culture during late Bronze Age and early Iron Age. Numerous Eastern Scythian remains have been found in an excellent state of preservation in the Altai mountains, with soft tissues such as skin and hair preserved.

The Altai Mountains have been identified as being the point of origin of a cultural enigma termed the Seima-Turbino Phenomenon which arose during the Bronze Age around the start of the 2nd millennium BC and led to a rapid and massive migration of peoples from the region into distant parts of Europe and Asia.

=== Later history ===
The area was part of the Xiongnu Empire, the First Turkic Khaganate, the Uyghur Empire, and the Yeniseian Kyrgyzs. It was during this time that the local population became fully Turkicized culturally and linguistically. There is increasing evidence for a partial continuity from the eastern Scythians to the Turkic-speakers of the Altai region.

Some historians believe that the Altai mountain region may have been the location where skiing was born, however this remains disputed. Evidence to support the claims includes several cave petroglyphs within the Altai Mountains in modern China that depict human figures on skis that are chasing after an ibex. According to a study published by the Australian Rock Art Research Association (AURA) in 2016, this rock art was estimated to be from between 4,000 and 5,250 years ago, which consequently meant it may be just as old or possibly older than ancient skiing rock art and artefacts located in Scandinavia. However, dating petroglyphs accurately with current technology is very difficult. The oldest known text that describes skiing is from a Chinese text that dates to the Western Han Dynasty (206 BC to 24 AD) and refers to skiers in the Altai Mountains.

== World Heritage Site ==
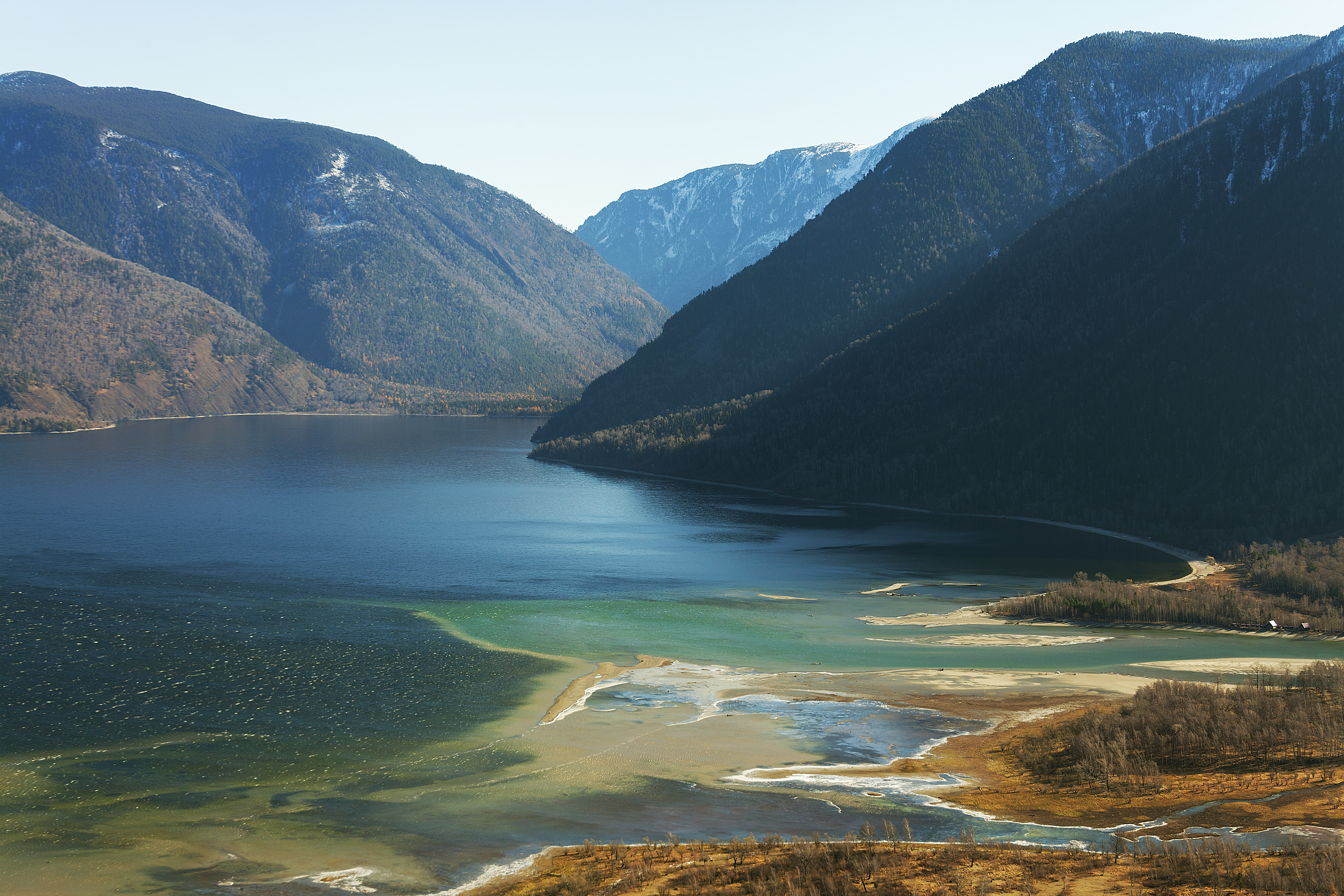
Lake Teletskoye

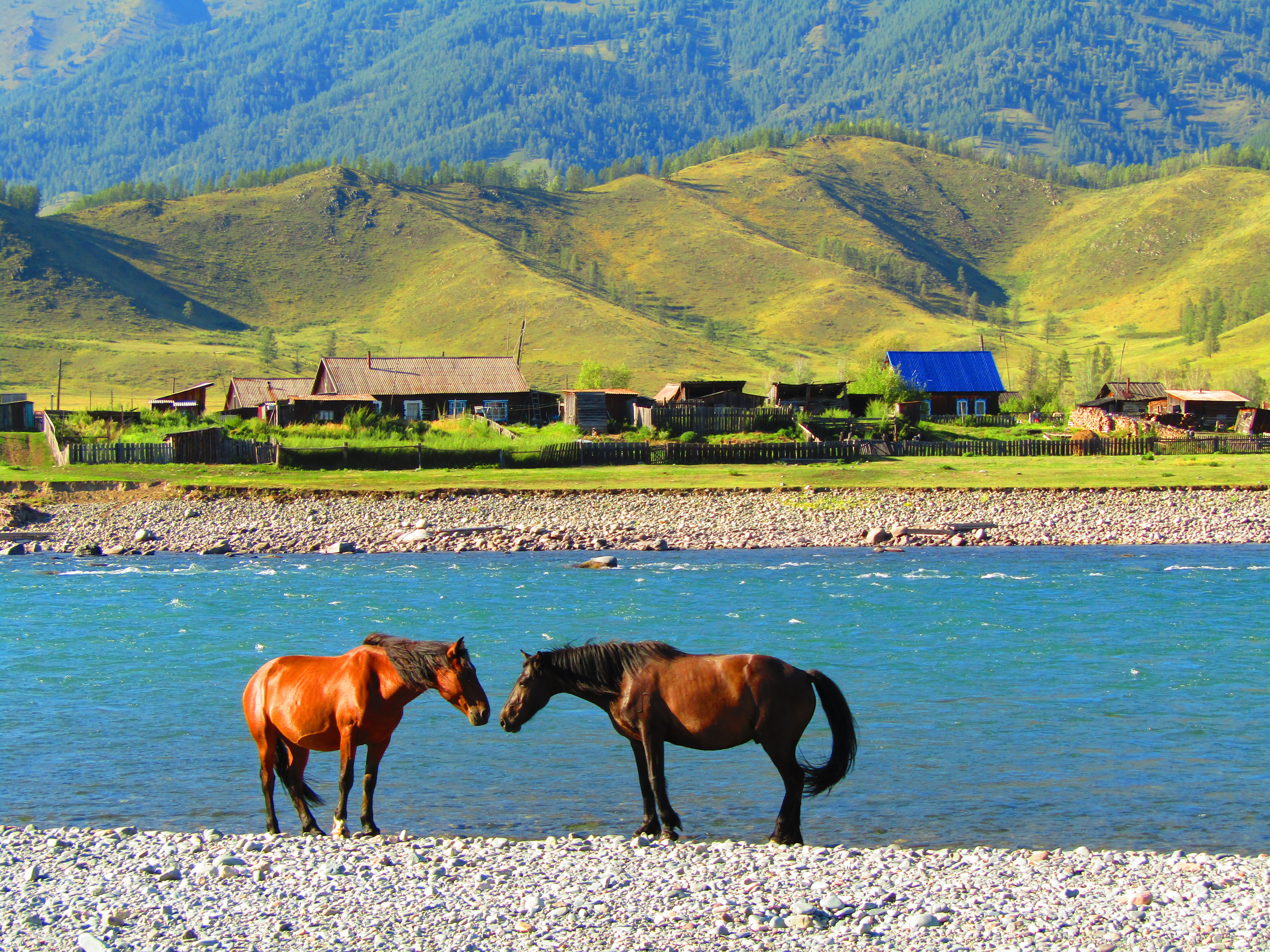
Natural Park of Belukha

A vast area of 16,178 km^{2} (6,246 sq mi)^{2}, which incorporates the Altai and Katun Natural Reserves, Lake Teletskoye, Mount Belukha, and the Ukok Plateau, this area is designated as a World Heritage Site (UNESCO), entitled the Golden Mountains of Altai. As stated in the UNESCO description of the site, "the region represents the most complete sequence of altitudinal vegetation zones in central Siberia, from steppe, forest-steppe, mixed forest, subalpine vegetation to alpine vegetation". While making its decision, UNESCO also cited Russian Altai's importance for preservation of the globally endangered mammals, such as Snow leopard, Altai argali, and Siberian ibex that live in these mountains. The Uvs Nuur basin is also a protected site.

Violations of the protection status of Argali sheep and other species have been alleged, together with accusations of corruption, in the Altaigate Scandal. The incident arose from the death of several Russian VIPs in a helicopter crash early in 2009, purportedly on a poaching excursion.

== Geology ==
The Siberian Altai represents the northernmost region affected by the tectonic collision of India into Asia. Extensive fault systems run through the area, including the Kurai fault zone and the recently identified Tashanta fault zone. These fault systems are typically thrusts or right lateral strike-slip faults, some of which are tectonically active. Rock types in the mountains are typically granites and metamorphic schists, and some are highly sheared near to fault zones.

Geologist Victor R. Baker "has discovered past cataclysmic floods in the Altai Mountains of Siberia" from "an even larger glacial lake" than Lake Missoula, which was once thought to have been "the largest ice-dammed lake in the world".

=== Seismic activity ===
Although earthquakes are generally rare occurrences, on September 27, 2003, a large earthquake measuring M_{W} 7.3 occurred in the Chuya Basin area to the south of the Altai region. This earthquake and its aftershocks devastated much of the region, causing $10.6 million in damage (USGS) and wiping out the village of Beltir.

== See also ==
- Altai Republic
- Altai Krai
- Altay Prefecture
- Govi-Altai Province
- Altaic languages
- Altay language
- Altai-Sayan region
- List of Altai mountains

== Sources ==
Authorities cited:

- P. Semenov and G. N. Potanin, in supplementary vol. of Russian ed. of Ritter's Asien (1877)
- Ledebour, Reise durch das Altaigebirge (1829–1830)
- P. Chikhatchev, Voyage scientifique dans l'Altai oriental (1845)
- Gebler, Übersicht des katunischen Gebirges (1837)
- G. von Helmersen, Reise nach dem Altai (St Petersburg, 1848)
- T. W. Atkinson, Oriental and Western Siberia (1858)
- Cotta, Der Altai (1871)
- Adrianov, "Journey to the Altai", in Zapiski Russ. Geogr. Soc. xi.
- Yadrintsev, "Journey in West Siberia", in Zapiski West Sib. Geogr. Soc. ii.
- Golubev, Altai (1890, Russian)
- Schmurlo, "Passes in S. Altai" (Sailughem), in Izvestia Russ. Geogr. Soc. (1898); xxxiv. 5
- V. Saposhnikov, various articles in same periodical (1897), xxxiii. and (1899) xxxv., and, by the same, Katun i yeya Istoki (Tomsk, 1901)
- S. Turner, Siberia (1905)
- Deniker, on Kozlov's explorations, in La Géographie (1901, pp. 41, &c.)
- P. Ignatov, in Izvestia Russ. Geog. Soc. (1902, No. 2).
