= Saylyugem =

Saylyugem may refer to:

- Saylyugem Mountains, on the border of the Altai Republic, Russia and Mongolia
- "Saylyugem", a zone of the Saylyugemsky National Park
- Mount Saylyugem, mountain in Altai Republic, in Talduayry Massif (Талдуайры),
- Saylyugem (Buguzun tributary), river in Altai Republic
