= Azas Nature Reserve =

Nature reserve in Tuva, Russia

- Russian: Азас заповедник
- IUCN category Ia (strict nature reserve)
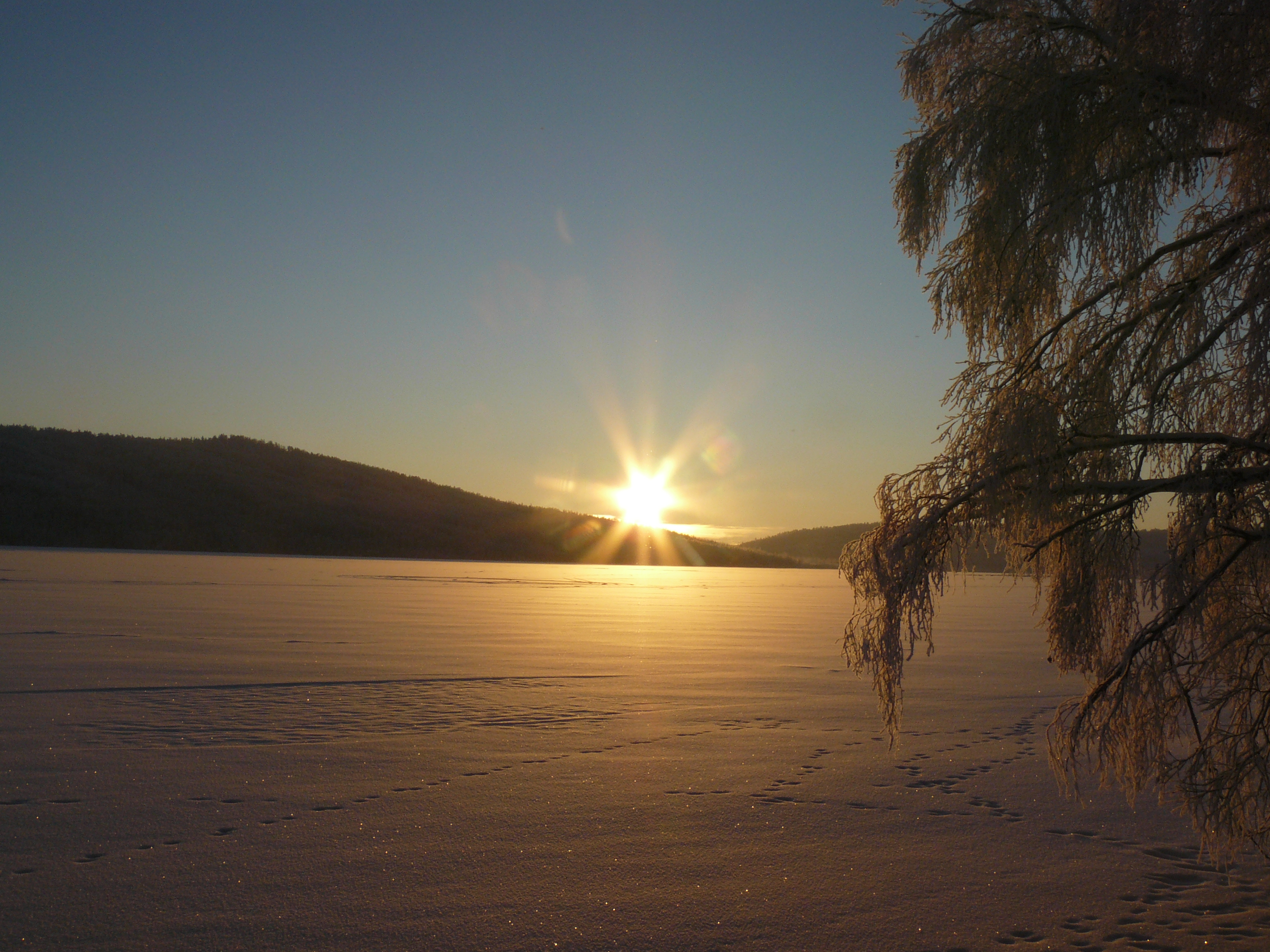
- Azas Zapovednik

- Location within Russia
- Location: Tuva
- Nearest city: Toora-Khem
- Coordinates: 52°28′12″N 96°8′11″E
- Area: 300,390 hectares (742,280 acres; 1,160 sq mi)
- Established: 1985
- Governing body: Ministry of Natural Resources and Environment (Russia)
- Website: http://zapovednik-azas.ru/

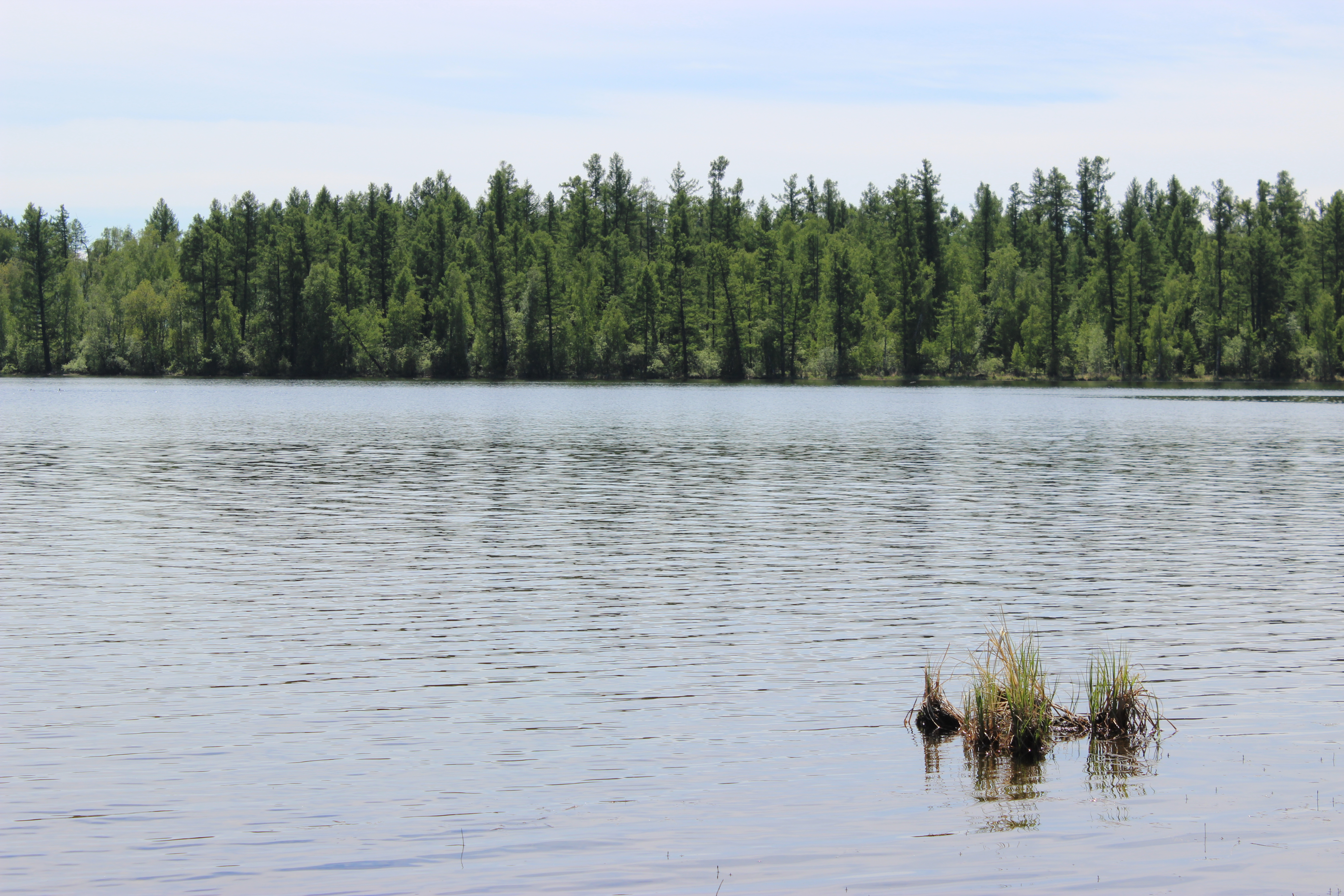
Azas lake

Azas Nature Reserve (Russian: Азас заповедник) is a Russian 'Zapovednik' (strict nature reserve), located in the central part of the Todzha basin (a large intermountain trough within the Altai-Sayan mountain region) of south-central Asia about 500 km west of Lake Baikal. The reserve stretches along the Azas River, and is situated in the Todzhinsky District of Tuva.

== Topography ==
The reserve covers a dense network of rivers and lakes in the mountain headwaters of what eventually becomes the Yenisei River. The primary river is the Azas River, which flows into Todzha Lake (Todzha is another name for Azas), before flowing out again as the Toora-Khem River. The base rock is Proterozoic and Paleozoic (that is, older than 250 million years) sandstones, limestones and various intrusions. In most of the territory this is covered with recent (Quaternary) moraine and fluvial sediments.

Located in the glacially-created Todzha Basin, the reserve itself is mid-level in altitude (850 meters to 2,000 meters), but surrounded on three sides by higher mountains (over 2,600 meters). To the west are the Western Sayan Mountains, and to the north and east are the Eastern Sayan Mountains. In the hilly moraine sections of the basic there are many lakes (30 large, and over 100 small lakes) and sphagnum bogs.

== Climate and ecoregion ==
Azas is located in the Sayan alpine meadows and tundra ecoregion. Below 2400 meters, this ecoregion is characterized by glacially-carved valleys with an upland mosaic landscape of alpine meadows and stands of upland conifers.

The climate of Azas is Subarctic climate (Köppen climate classification Dwc), characterized by long, very cold winters and cool summers. The average daily temperature in January is -28,7 C °, in July - +14,6 C °. There are only 52 frost-free days on average, and the average annual precipitation is 343 mm, 60% of which falls in the summer.

== Flora and fauna ==
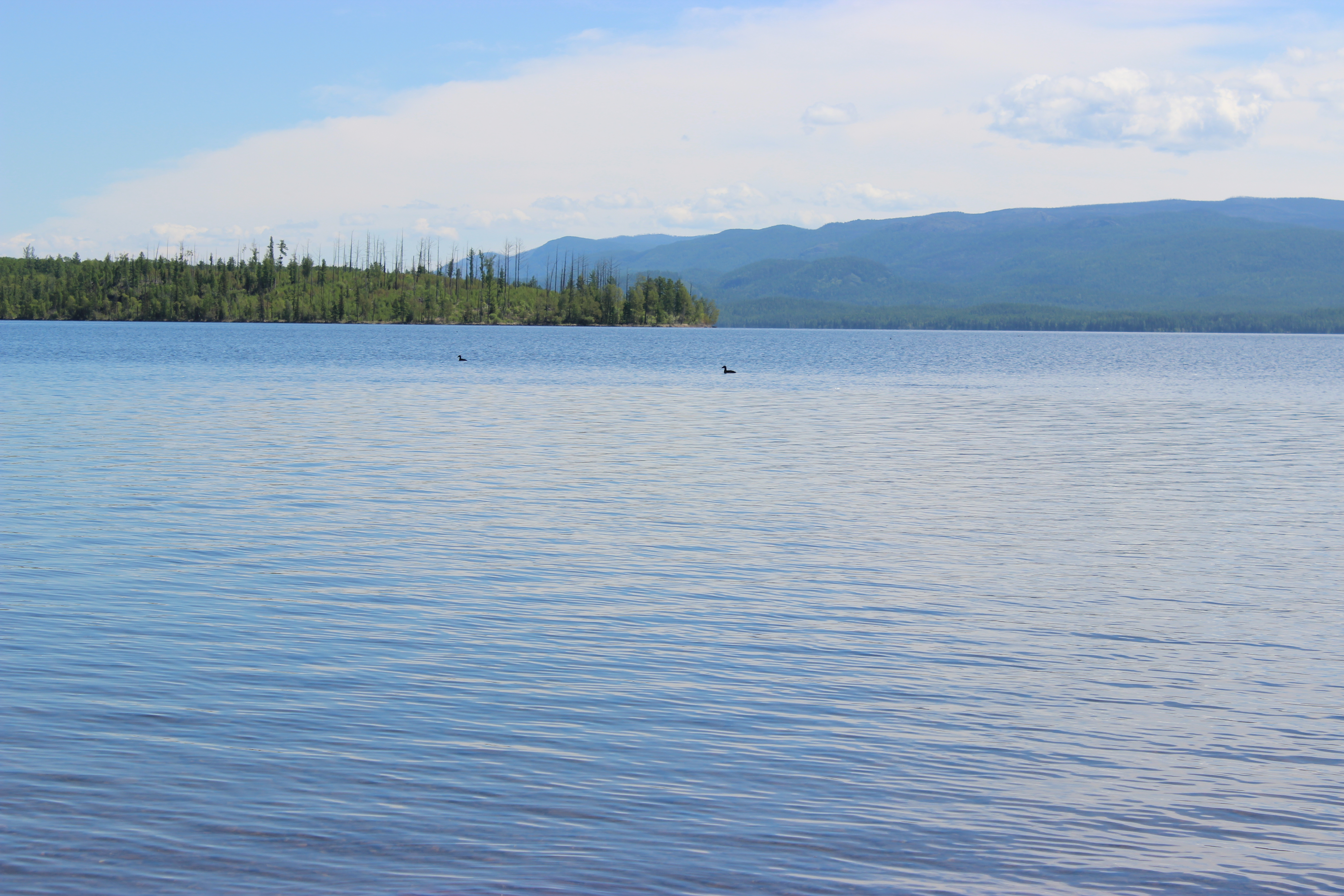
Azas lake's birds

Forest areas occupy 68% of the reserve, bald mountain tundra and alpine meadows cover 16%, and the remainder is bogs, meadows, grasslands, rivers and lakes. The forests display altitude zoning, with larch-birch below 1100 meters, larch-pine-moss up to 1700 meters, and alpine pine-cedar-large above 1700 meters. The animal life in the reserve has not yet been fully studied, but is typical of the Altai-Sayan mountain country and the base steppe sections.

== Ecoeducation and access ==
Azas is a protected nature reserve, but ecological tourism is permitted on marked educational routes. The most popular destination is Lake Azas, and there are 30 sites of religious pilgrimage in the territory. Most active tourism beyond hiking is forbidden - no camping, etc. - unless in an official group led by reserve guides and scientists. In the buffer zone around the reserve there are facilities for camping and recreation. In 2003-2004, 17 beavers were relocated from the Azas River to the Belin River (Kaa-Khemsky district) with permits from the Ministry of Natural Resources of the Russian Federation. After resettlement, the number of beavers on the Azas River is 45-46 beavers in 13 settlements, with the prospect of restoring the previous number.

== See also ==
- List of Russian Nature Reserves (class 1a 'zapovedniks')
