= Kinzelyuk Waterfall =

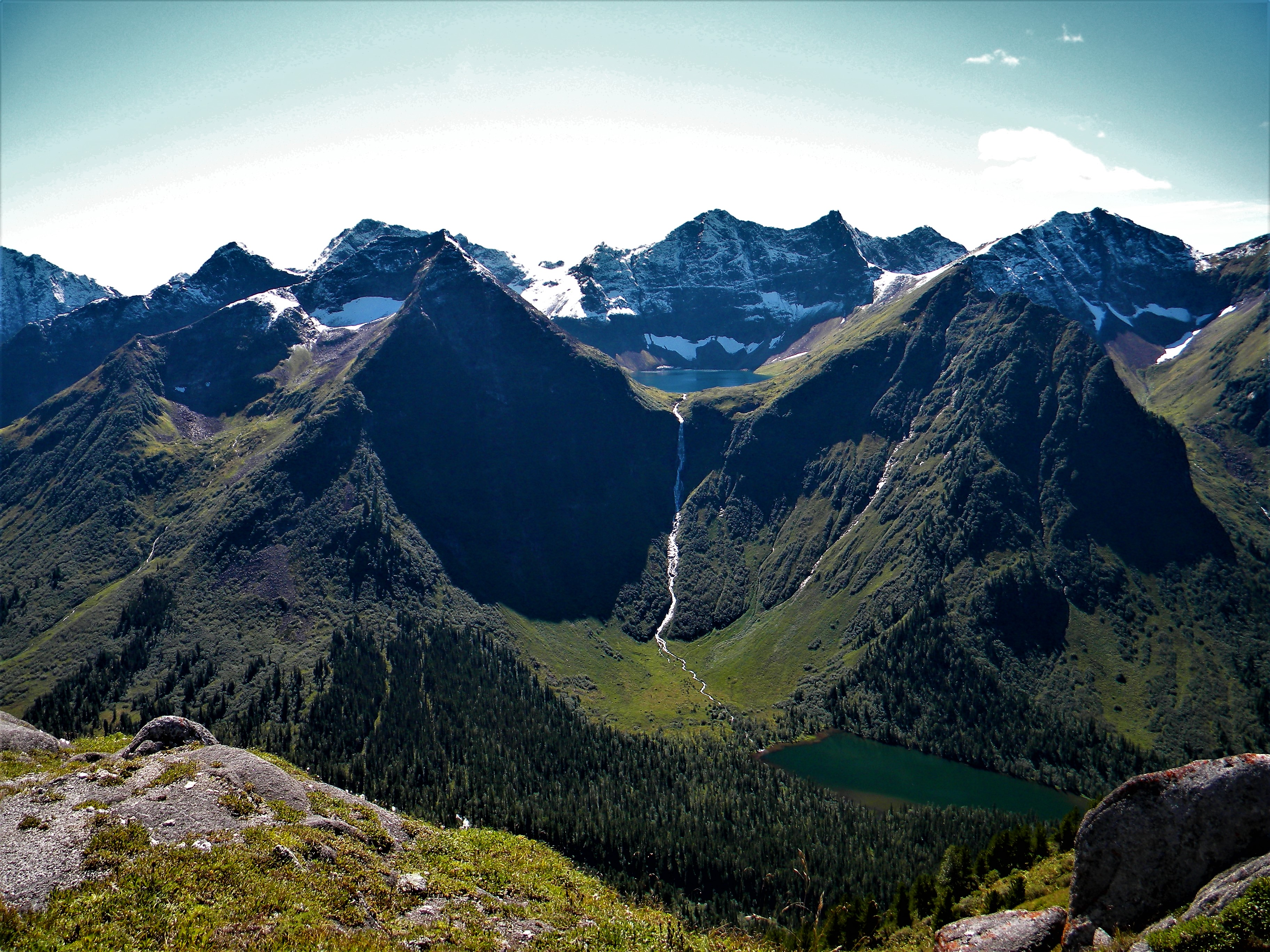

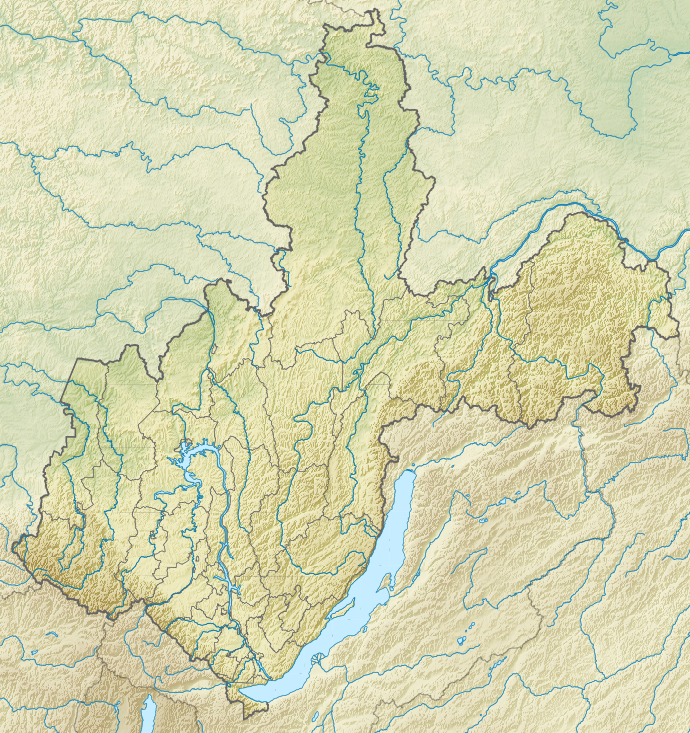
- Location within Irkutsk Oblast Location within Russia
- Location: Krasnoyarsk Krai, Russia
- Coordinates: 54°09′30″N 95°49′53″E

The Kinzelyuk Waterfall (Кинзелюкский водопад (Russian)) is the third tallest waterfall in Russia, surpassed only by Talnikovy and Big Zeygalan, which rank first and second respectively. In 1989, a team led by Petro Kravchuk estimated its height to be 328 meters(1076ft).

The waterfall is located in the eastern part of the Kuraginsky District, near the border of the Irkutsk Oblast, in the sparsely populated region of Siberia known as Tofalaria.

The stream flows out of Lake Kinzelyuk, which occupies the summit of Kinzelyuk Mountain, with a height of 1601 meters(5253ft). The water falls into the small Lower Kinzelyuk Lake, which feeds the Kinzelyuk River, a tributary of the Kizir River.

The Kinzelyuk Mountain is part of the Kinzelyuk Ridge, the westernmost spur of the Agul Belki mountains. The entire mountainous region is known as the Eastern Sayan mountains.

== See also ==
- List of waterfalls
