= Kizir =

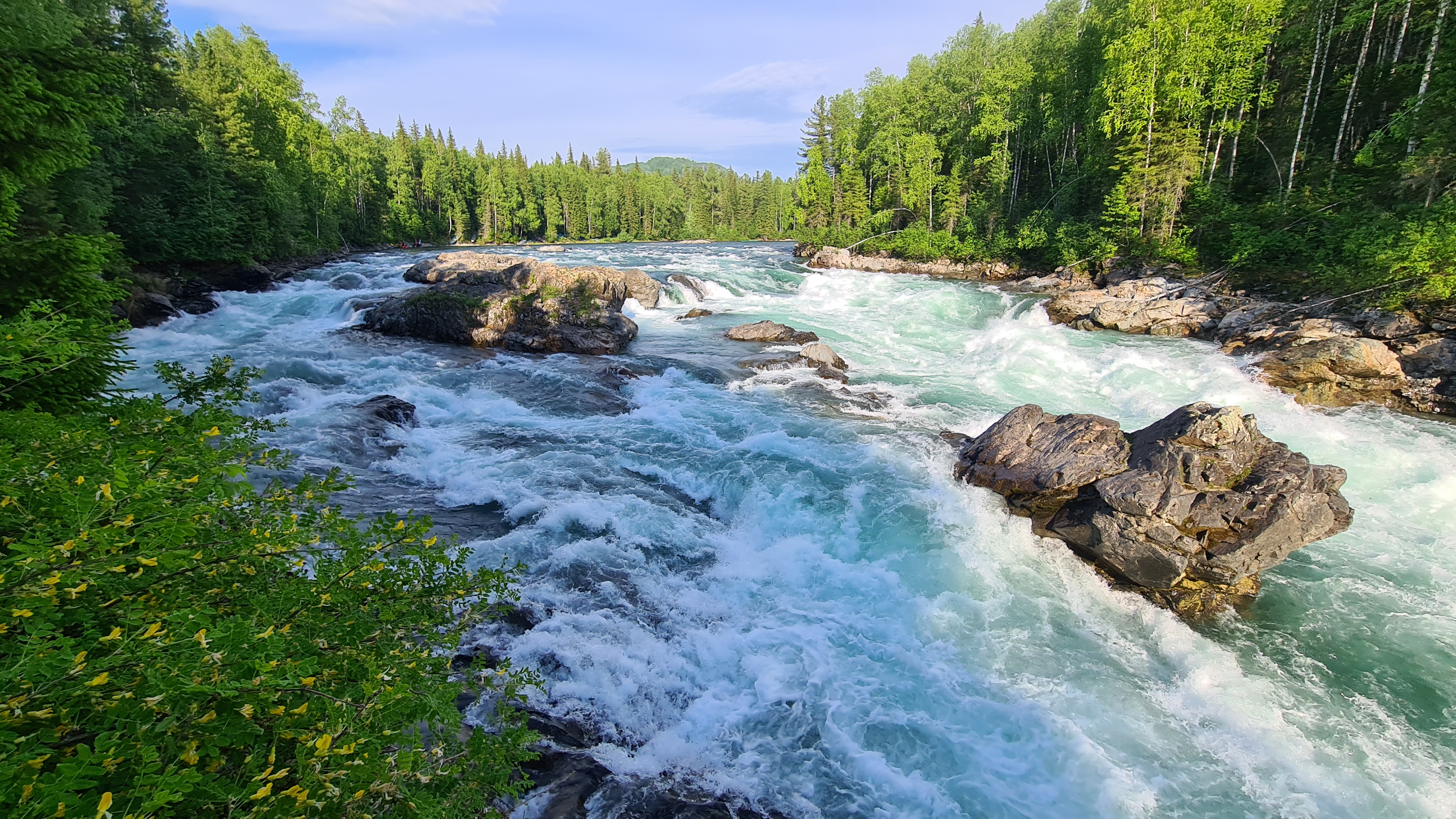

Location
- Country: Russia

Physical characteristics
- Mouth: Kazyr
  - coordinates: 53.8485°N 93.1054°E
- Length: 300 km (190 mi)
- Basin size: 9,170 km^{2} (3,540 sq mi)

Basin features
- Progression: Kazyr→ Tuba→ Yenisey→ Kara Sea

The Kizir (Russian: Кизир) is a right tributary of the Kazyr. It flows through the Eastern Sayan Mountains in the Krasnoyarsk Krai of Russia. Its source is located in the Kryzhin Range. It is 300 kilometres (190 mi) long, and has a drainage basin of 9,170 square kilometres (3,540 sq mi). The river contains many cataracts which make it popular with Siberian rafters. Another tourist attraction is the Kinzelyuk Waterfall, one of the highest in Asia.
