= Chuya Belki =

Mountainous region in Russia

- Чуйские белки
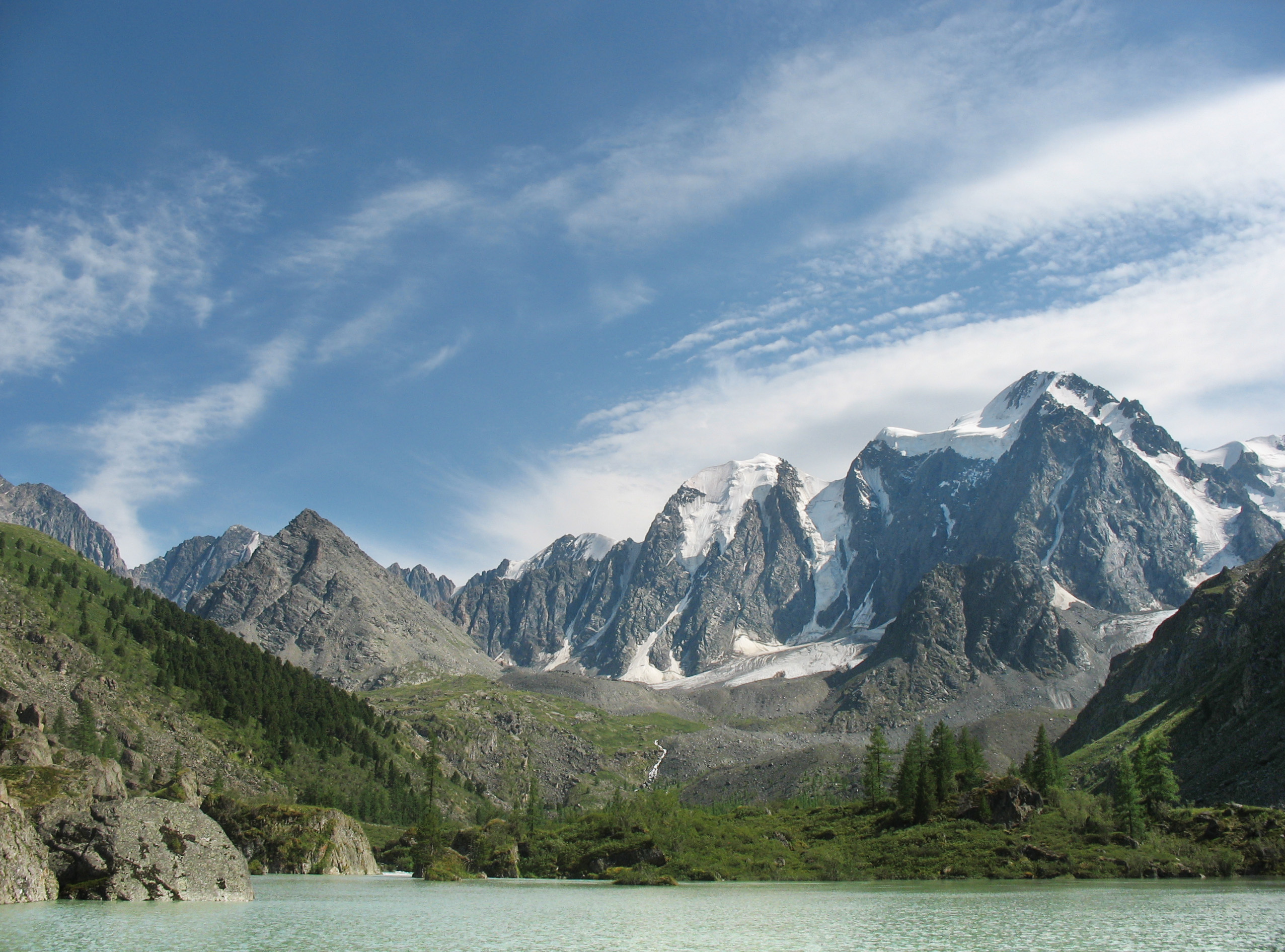
- Upper Shavli Lake with the main ridge of the Northern Chuya Range in the background

Highest point
- Elevation: 4,177 m (13,704 ft)
- Prominence: 1,560 m (5,120 ft)
- Coordinates: 49°57′09″N 87°33′38″E

Geography
- Location within Altai Republic
- Location: Altai Republic, Russia
- Parent range: Altai Mountains; South Siberian Mountains

Chuya Belki (Russian: Чуйские белки, Chuyskye byelki) is a mountainous region in the Altai, Altai Republic, Russia. There are a number of glaciers on the northern part of the slopes of the main ridges. The Chuya Belki are named after the Chuya River and after their "Belki" type of ridges.

== Description ==
The Chuya Belki consist of two ranges that are connected:

- Northern Chuya Range, highest point 4,177 metres (13,704 ft) (4,173 metres (13,691 ft) according to other sources).
- Southern Chuya Range, highest point 3,960 metres (12,990 ft)

The highest peak is the Maasheybash in the Northern Chuya Range, reaching 4,177 metres (13,704 ft) above sea level. In the Southern Chuya Range the highest point is the 3,960 metres (12,990 ft) high Irbistu (Ирбисту).

== See also ==
- List of mountains and hills of Russia
- Saylyugemsky National Park
- Toponymy of the Altai Republic
