= Sayan alpine meadows and tundra =

Ecoregion in Russia and Mongolia

Coordinates: 51.75°N 96.25°E

Sayan Alpine meadows and tundra
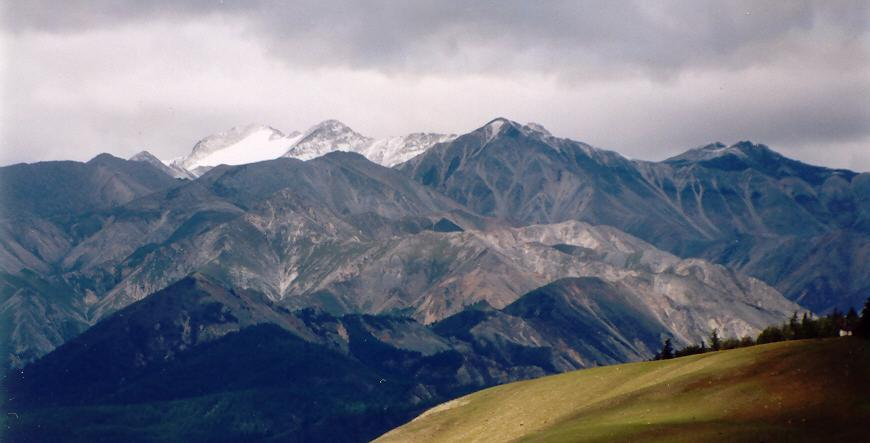
- Eastern Sayan Mountains

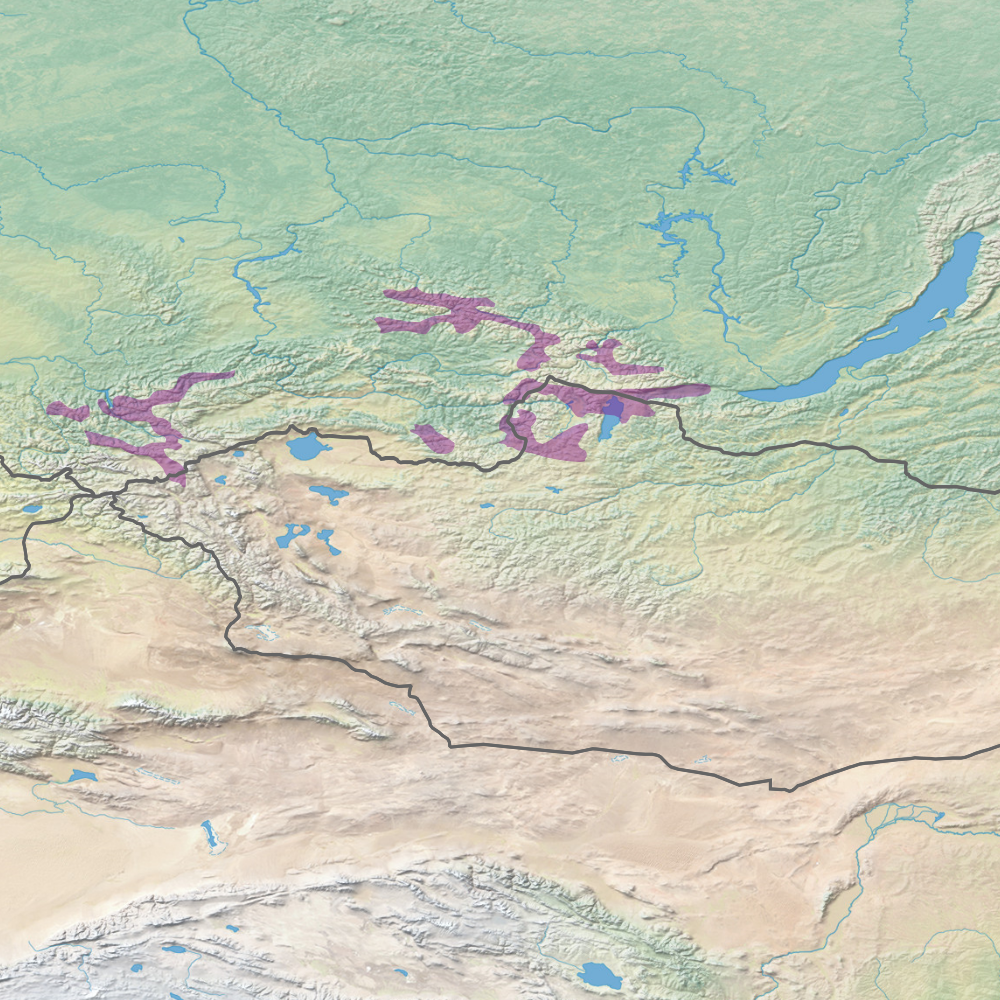
- Ecoregion territory (in purple)

Ecology
- Realm: Palearctic
- Biome: montane grasslands and shrublands
- Borders: List: Altai alpine meadow and tundra; East Siberian taiga; Sayan intermontane steppe; Sayan montane conifer forests; Selenge-Orkhon forest steppe

Geography
- Area: 846,149 km^{2} (326,700 sq mi)
- Countries: Mongolia; Russia

The Sayan Alpine meadows and tundra ecoregion (WWF ID: PA1016) is an ecoregion that covers the high areas of the Sayan Mountains above the treeline, between the Altai Mountains in the west and Lake Baikal in the east. The area is remote and protects diverse species of alpine flora and fauna. It has an area of 846,149 square kilometres (326,700 sq mi).

== Location and description ==
The ecoregions covers the terrain above the treeline in the high ranges of the Western Sayan Mountains, in the Altai Republic, and the Eastern Sayan Mountains, reaching almost to Irkutsk. There are also some high areas in northern Mongolia. This ecoregion is characterized by glacially-carved valleys with an upland mosaic landscape of alpine meadows.

== Climate ==
The region has a subalpine climate (Köppen Dfc). This climate is characterized by high variation in temperature, both daily and seasonally; with long, cold winters and short, cool summers with one to three months averaging at least 10 °C or 50 °F. Mean precipitation is about 500 millimetres (20 in)/year. The mean temperature at the center of the ecoregion is −29.5 °C (−21.1 °F) in January, and 13 °C (55 °F) in July.

== Flora and fauna ==
Both plant and animal diversity is high, as the area is relatively protected by its remoteness and by its position at the meeting places of different ecological zones. From treeline up to the barren rock zone, alpine meadows and associated species predominate.

== Protections ==
There are two significant nationally protected area that reach into this ecoregion:

- Altai Nature Reserve, which has populations of Snow leopard, and Argali, among other threatened species,
- Azas Nature Reserve, with bald mountain tundra and alpine meadows representing about 16% of the reserve.

== See also ==
- List of ecoregions in Russia
- List of ecoregions in Mongolia
