= Tuba (river) =

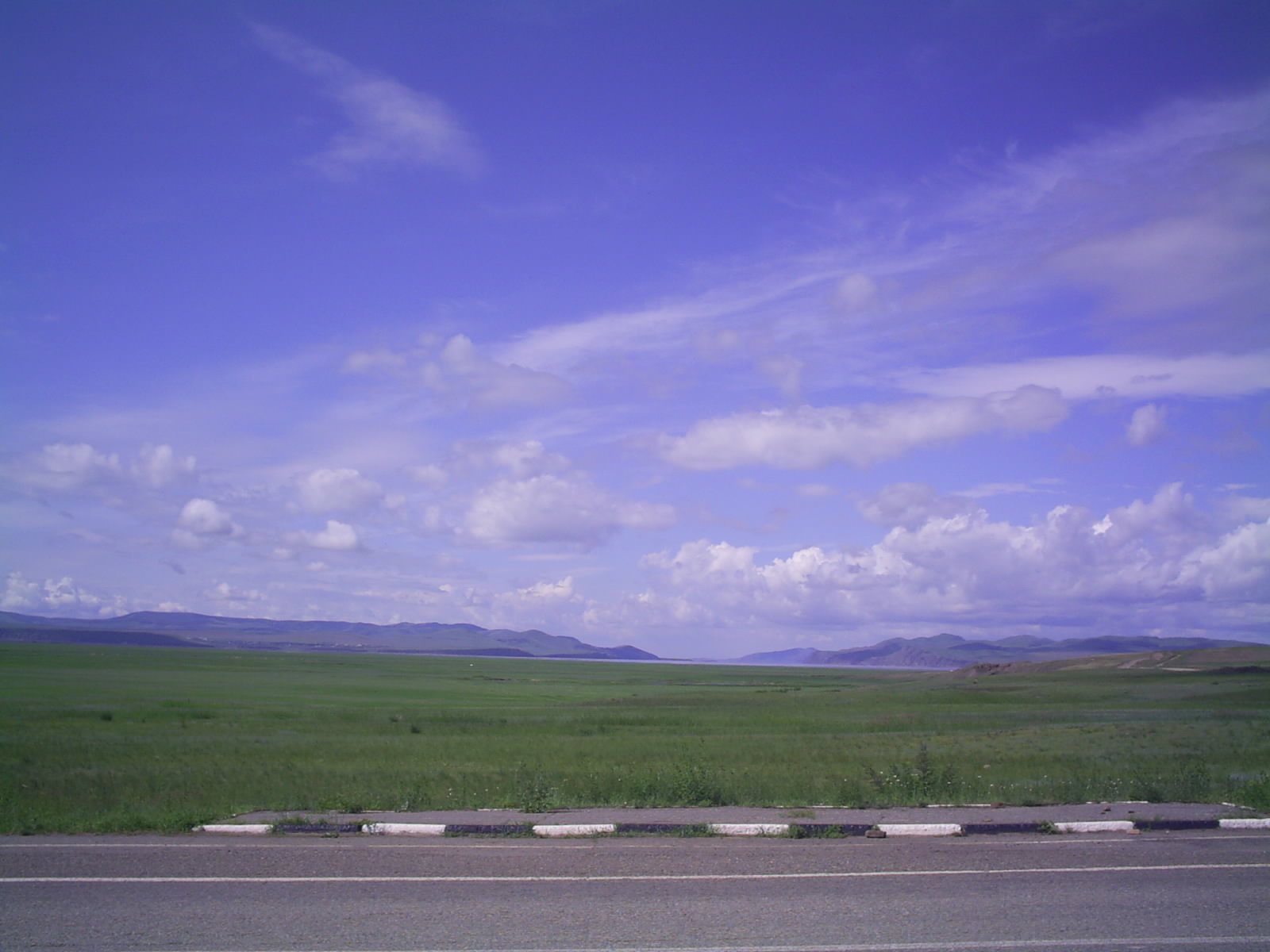
- The Tuba at its outflow into the Krasnoyarsk Reservoir

Location
- Country: Russia

Physical characteristics
- Mouth: Yenisey
  - location: Krasnoyarsk Reservoir
  - coordinates: 53.9449°N 91.5294°E
- Length: 119 km (74 mi)
- Basin size: 36,900 km^{2} (14,200 sq mi)

Basin features
- Progression: Yenisey→ Kara Sea

The Tuba (Russian: Туба́) is a river in Krasnoyarsk Krai in Siberia in Russia. It is formed by the confluence of the rivers Kazyr (Казыр) and Amyl (Амы́л) and is a right tributary of the Yenisey.

The length of the river proper is 119 kilometres (74 mi) or 507 kilometres (315 mi) from the headwaters of the Kazyr in the Eastern Sayan Mountains in the Minusinsk Hollow. The area of its basin, which includes more than a thousand lakes, is 36,900 square kilometres (14,200 mi^{2}).

The Tuba flows into the Krasnoyarsk Reservoir so that the mouth of the Tuba is actually part of the reservoir.

The river is navigable at high water to 99 kilometres (62 mi) from its mouth, but it freezes sometime around late October to early December, and thaws from April to early May.

There are two (sometimes considered three) road bridges and a railway bridge constructed over the Tuba.

== See also ==
- Хакасско-Минусинская котловина.jpg, a map of the Upper Yenisei and its tributaries including the Tuba (in Russian)
