= Krasnoyarsk Reservoir =

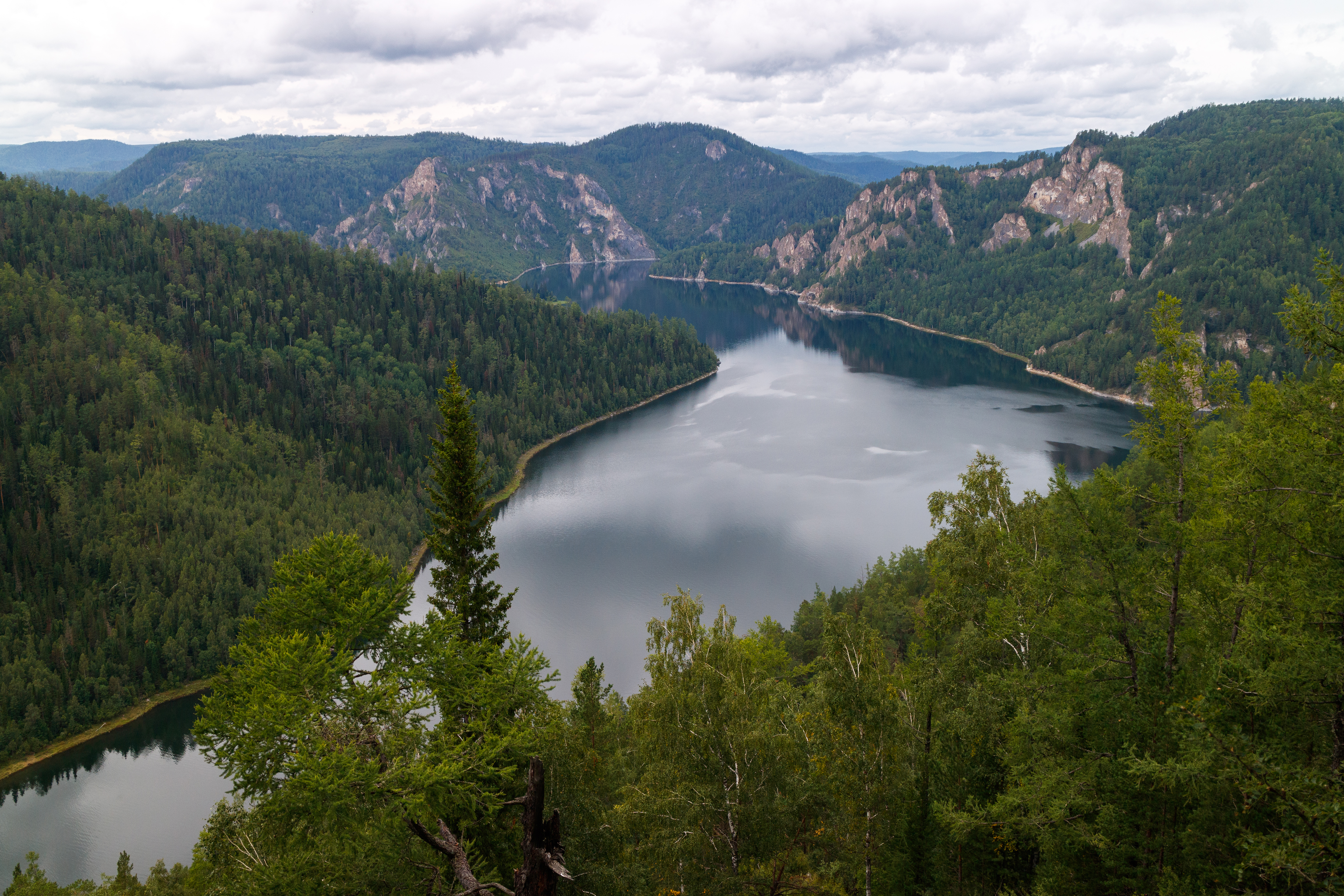
- Krasnoyarsk Reservoir, Biryusa Bay

- Location within Russia Location within Krasnoyarsk Krai
- Location: Krasnoyarsk Krai
- Coordinates: 54°55′N 91°40′E
- Type: Hydroelectric reservoir
- Primary inflows: Yenisei, Tuba, Sisim, Biryusa
- Basin countries: Russia
- Surface area: 2,000 km^{2} (770 sq mi)
- Average depth: 37 m (121 ft)
- Max. depth: 105 m (344 ft)
- Surface elevation: 243 m (797 ft)
- Settlements: Abakan

The Krasnoyarsk Reservoir, known also as the Krasnoyarsk Sea, is an artificial lake that was created by the construction of the Krasnoyarsk Dam. It is one of the largest artificial reservoirs in the world. In Russia, it now ranks second (after the Bratsk Reservoir).

The top point of the reservoir is located near the town of Abakan, at the confluence of the Yenisei River with the Abakan River. Its lower point is the Krasnoyarsk hydroelectric power station dam. The distance from the top point to the Krasnoyarsk hydroelectric power station is about 250 kilometers (160 mi), but the total length of the reservoir is much more, 388 kilometers (241 mi). Its width at its widest points is 15 kilometers (9.3 mi). The elevation of the water is 243 meters (797 ft) above sea level.

The reservoir is fed by some large rivers, including the Tuba, Sisim, and Syda rivers on the right bank, and the Biryusa River on the left bank. The confluences where the rivers flow directly into the dammed Yenisei are now bays created by the reservoir. The most significant of them are formed by the Tubin, Syda, Karasug, Sisim, Durbin, and Biryusinsk rivers.

The largest settlements on the shore of the reservoir are the regional centers of Abakan, Krasnoturansk (located on Syda Bay), and Novoselovo. There are no bridges over the reservoir; the nearest bridges across the Yenisei are located a few kilometers above and below the reservoir. However, there are ferry connections across the reservoir, particularly from the villages of Novoselovo and Bellyk. Until the early 1990s, there was a passenger hydrofoil on the reservoir.

With the creation of the reservoir, the location of one of the first Russian settlements in Siberia was flooded: Abakan fort (near modern Krasnoturansk). It was populated by Khakassky tribes.

== See also ==
- Ship lift of Krasnoyarsk hydroelectric power station
