= Hanging Stone =

Stone in Ergaki Nature Park, Russia

Hanging Stone Висячий камень (Russian)
- Rock formation

- Location within Russia
- Coordinates: 52°50′05″N 93°21′14″E
- Location: Ergaki Nature Park, Krasnoyarsk Krai, Russia
- Range: Ergaki (Sayan Mountains)

The Hanging Stone (Russian: Висячий камень, romanized: Visyachyi Kamen') is a 500-ton granite rock in Ergaki Nature Park mountain range in southern Siberia, Russia seemingly hanging 1,000 m (3,300 ft) above Lake Raduzhnoye.

== Background ==
The Hanging Stone is on the edge of a cliff above Lake Raduzhnoye (Rainbow Lake) in the western Sayan Mountains in Krasnoyarsk Krai, Russia. The stone is an attraction in the Ergaki Nature Park.

== Legend ==
The legend of the stone is thought to come from the Mongol peoples. They believe that the world will end when the stone falls. The area features a chain of rocks or a ridge that appears to be a silhouette of a man lying on his back, which is said to represent a person from the legend known as "Sleeping Sayan". Local legend states that when the stone falls into Lake Raduzhnoye, the Sleeping Sayan will wake up. Another legend teaches that the monolithic stone is the heart of the Sleeping Sayan. People say that the stone vibrates, which is evidence of the beating heart. Some people also believe that the rock may represent the Russian mythical hero Svyatogor.

Several groups of tourists have tried to dislodge the landmark by pushing it down the mountain, but without any success. Some people have even brought winches and jacks to try to dislodge the stone. It did not move at all; it is held on with stone chips supporting its base. The area also experiences frequent earthquakes, but the stone has not moved as of 2024.

== Description ==
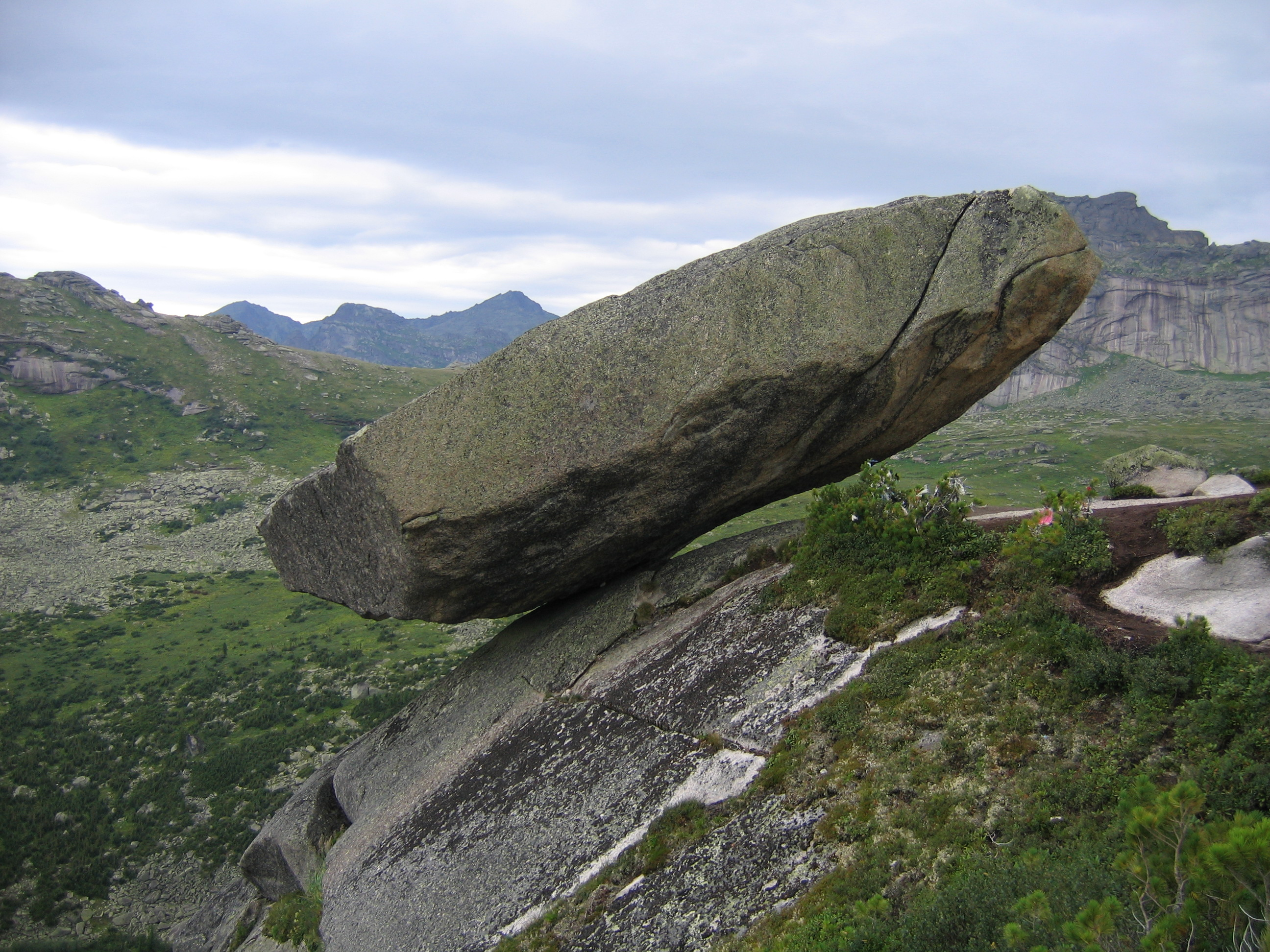
The Hanging Stone, Western Sayan, Ergaki mountains

The stone is perched on a precipice, giving the impression that it may fall. The weight of the stone is estimated at 500 tons. It is positioned approximately 1,000 m (3,300 ft) above the lake. The stone is 15 m (49 ft) long. At one time the stone reportedly swayed, but over time grooves became clogged and froze the stone in one place.

There is a trail leading to the stone that can be navigated between June and September. The trail is 12 km (7.5 mi) long and takes five to seven hours. The Ergaki Nature Park charges 4,800 rubles for a guided tour to visit the stone. The weather in the region changes quickly and can even receive snowfall in June.
