= Ergaki =

Mountain range in Russia

Yergaki Range
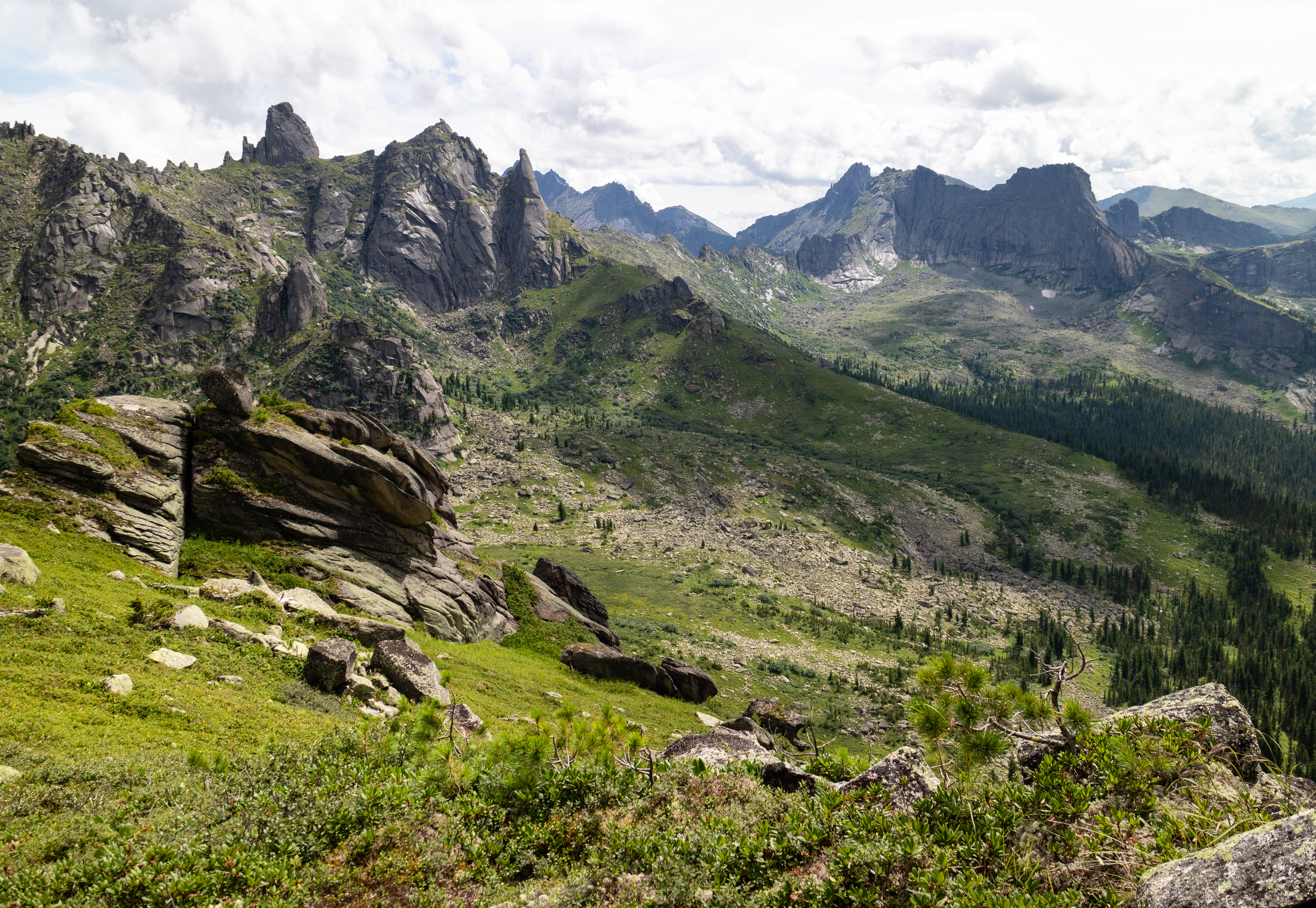

Highest point
- Peak: Zvezdny
- Elevation: 2,533 m (8,310 ft)
- Coordinates: 52°50′00″N 93°21′00″E

Naming
- Native name: Ергаки (Russian)

Geography
- Location within Krasnoyarsk Krai
- Location: Krasnoyarsk Krai, Buryatia, Russia
- Parent range: Western Sayan Mountains

Ergaki (Russian: Ергаки) is a mountain range of the Western Sayan Mountains in southern Siberia, Russia.

Ergaki Nature Park is a protected area which contains the mountain range. One natural feature of the park is the Hanging Stone, it is a stone which is perched high above Lake Raduzhnoye.

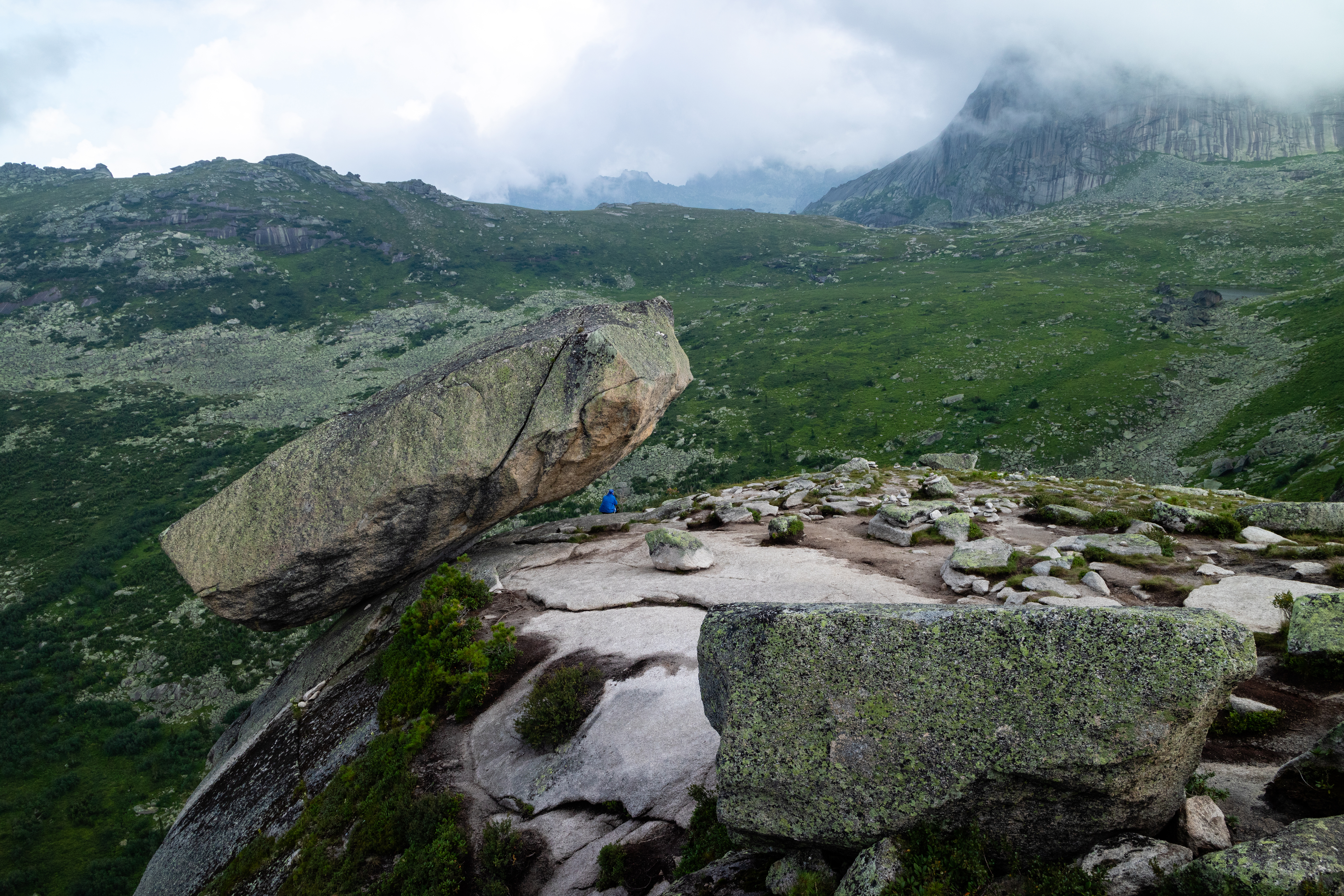
A balanced granite monolith called the Hanging Stone
