= Belki (geography) =

Mountain summit in Siberia

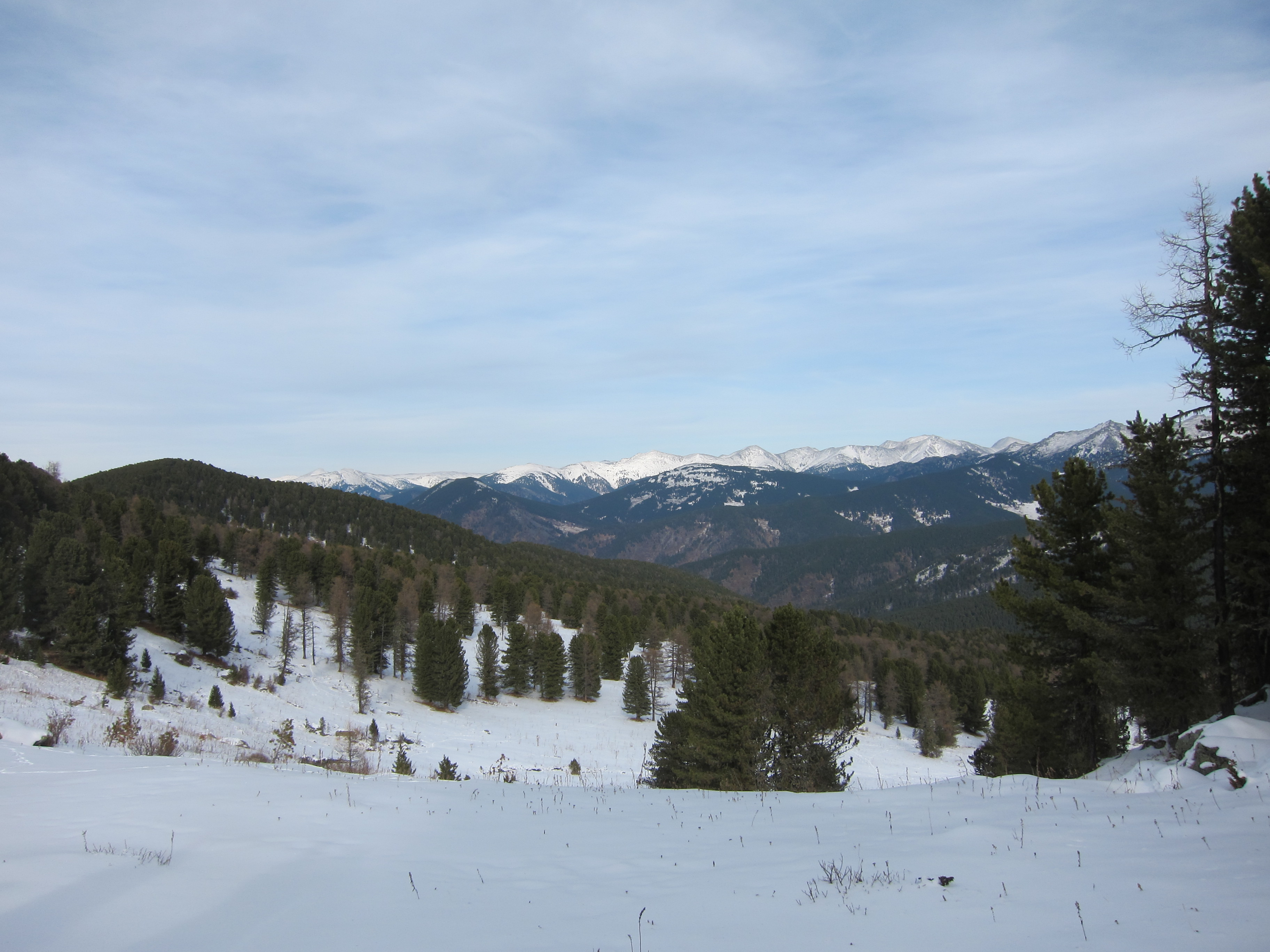
View of the Kumin Belki (Куминские Белки), Chemalsky District, Altai Republic, Russia.

Belki (Russian: белки; Khakas: Taskhyl), also known as Belogorye (Russian: белогорье), is a type of mountain summit in Southern Siberia.

== Description ==
Belki are snowy mountain peaks rising above the treeline. The name means "white mountains" and, unlike the "golets", which are more often than not free of snow in the summer, the Belki have generally a permanent snow cover.

The terms "Belki" and "Belogorye" are part of the geographical name of several peaks and ridges of the South Siberian System, especially in the region of the Altai Mountains, such as the Katun Belki and Chuya Belki, as well as in the Eastern Sayan, such as the Agul Belki, Manskoye Belogorye, Kuturchinskoye Belogorye and Kanskoye Belogorye.

== See also ==
- List of mountain types
- South Siberian Mountains
