= Ergaki Nature Park =

Nature park in Siberia

- IUCN category II (national park)
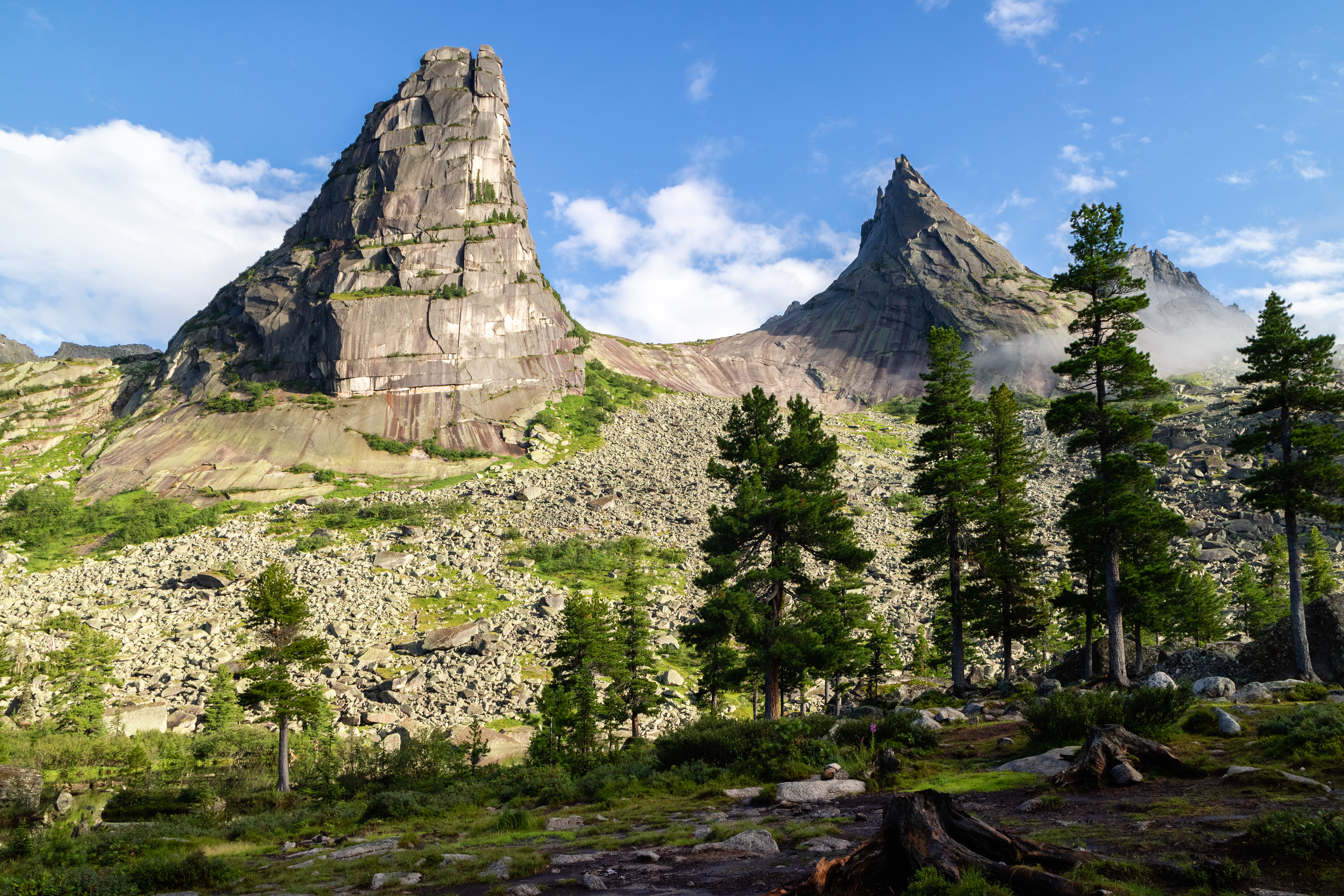
- Ergaki Nature Park

- Location within Russia
- Location: Krasnoyarsk Krai
- Nearest city: Turan
- Coordinates: 52°42′N 93°20′E
- Area: 3,428.73 km^{2} (1,323.84 sq mi)
- Established: 2005
- Visitors: ≈120,000 (in 2021)
- Website: Ergaki Nature Park

Ergaki Nature Park (Russian: Природный парк Ергаки, also referred to as Irgaki) is located in located in the Ergaki mountain range in southern Siberia, Russia. The park was established in 2005 and it is referred to as the "Russian Yosemite".

== Background ==
On April 4, 2005, Ergaki Nature Park was established as a protected area of Siberia. The purpose of the nature park designation was to protect and preserve the area and resources while also developing tourism. Park is located in Western Sayan Mountains and this mountain range was thought to be an area which would attract recreational tourism. The park covers an area of over 217,000 ha (540,000 acres).

== History ==
The park is in Krasnoyarsk Krai and it is a popular tourist area. It is known for its recreational uses and there is a hiking trail which is 35 km (22 mi) long. The trail was started in 2005 and it takes tourists through the park passing glacial lakes, mountains, canyons and rivers with waterfall features. It is recommended that hikers allow themselves three to five days to complete the trail. The trail ends at Lake Raduzhnoe, which is below a natural feature and attraction known as the Hanging Stone. One quarter of the park is off limits to visitors so that the areas are not disturbed. Threats to the park include tourism, poaching, and logging. The park is monitored by the Natural Park Protection Service.

=== Features ===
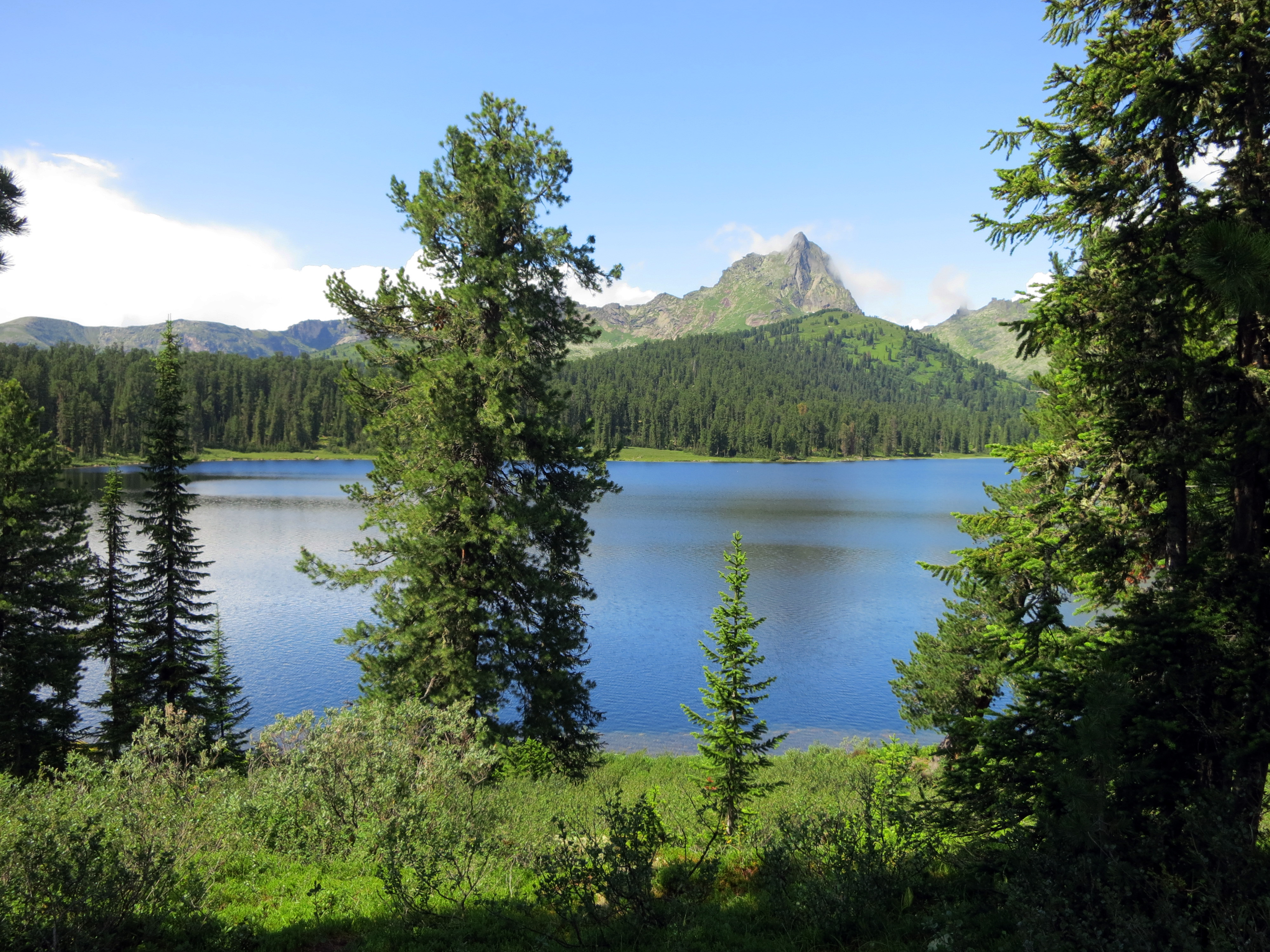
Cedar forests and lake of Ergaki Nature Park

The park also has a rock ridge known as 'Sleeping Sayan". The ridge appears to be a silhouette of a man lying on his back. Authorities say that the park was visited by 120 thousand tourists per year. Many of the peaks have been given names, like Mirror, Bird, Star, Dragon's Tooth and Cone.

The highest point found in the park is found in the Aradansky mountain range: it is 2,466 m (8,091 ft). The second highest is found in the middle of the Ergaki mountains (Zvezdny peak) 2,265 m (7,431 ft). Also within the park is a natural feature called the Hanging Stone. It is large stone which seems to teeter on the cliff face perched high above Lake Raduzhnoye.

=== Flora ===
The park has hundreds of different mosses, liverworts, lichens and fungi. The park is estimated to have 1,500 different species of vascular plants. There are more than fifty species of the Asteraceae flowering plants. There are Ergakov mushrooms which have not been the subject of studies.

== See also ==
- National parks of Russia
