= Saylyugem Mountains =

Mountain range in Russia and Mongolia

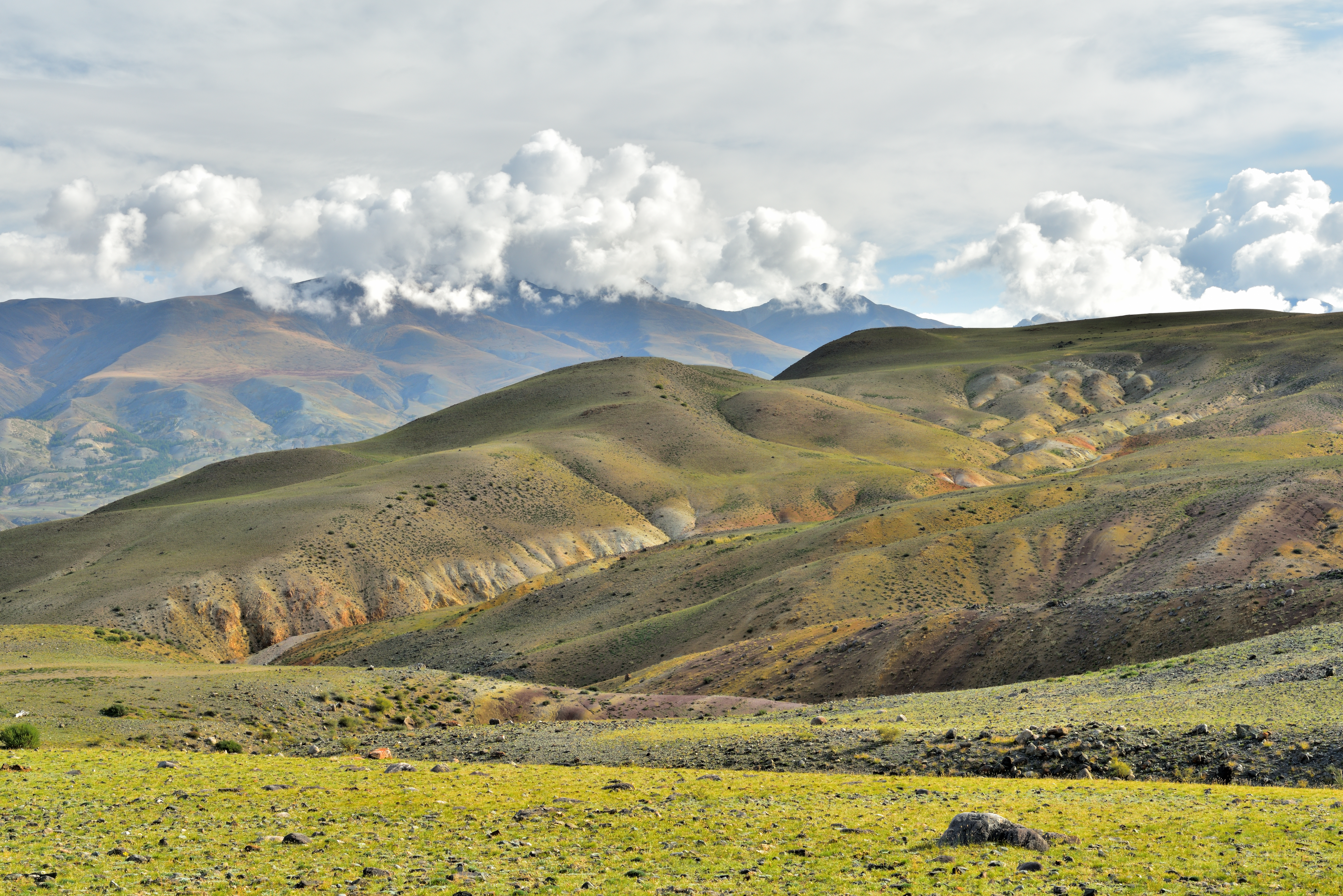
Saylyugemsky National Park, Argut zone

Sailughem Mountains (Russian: Сайлюгем, Sajljugem; Mongolian: Сийлхэмийн нуруу, Sîlhemîn nurû), or Siilhem, is a mountain range in the southeastern part of the Altai Mountains, Russia, on the border of the Altai Republic and Mongolia.

In Russia, its northern slopes are in the Kosh-Agachsky District, in the southeastern part of the Ukok Plateau. It is the southern border of the Chuya Steppe. Inn Mongolia ti is in the Bayan-Ölgii Province.

The range stretches 130 km north-east from 49° N and 86° E towards the western extremity of the Sayan Mountains in 51° 60′ N (sic) and 89° E. Their mean elevation is 1,500 to 1,750 metres (5000 to 5500 feet). The snow-line runs at 2,000 m on the northern side and at 2,400 m on the southern, and above it the rugged peaks tower up some 975 metres (3200 feet) more. It is a watershed between the sources of rivers Argut and Chuya (Ob River basin) and the rivers of the Khovd River basin.

The highest peaks are Sary-Nokhoit (3502 m.) and Sarzhematy (3499 m.).

In the Mongolian part, on the Southern slopes there is Siilkhemiin National Park. In Russia, there is Saylyugemsky National Park, bordering with the Mongolian one, within the Kosh-Agach District. It is a protected area of Russia and has three zones: Saylyugem, Ulandryk, and Argut.
