= List of mountain types =

Mountains and hills can be characterized in several ways. Some mountains are volcanoes and can be characterized by the type of lava and eruptive history. Other mountains are shaped by glacial processes and can be characterized by their shape. Finally, many mountains can be characterized by the type of rock that make up their composition.

== Types of mountains according to geology ==
=== Glacially sculpted mountains and hills ===
- Arête
- Drumlin
- Esker
- Flyggberg
- Nunatak
- Pyramidal peak
- Whaleback mountain

=== Volcanic mountains ===
- Cinder cone
- Complex volcano
- Guyot
- Lava cone
- Lava dome
- Mud volcano
- Pancake dome
- Pyroclastic cone
- Pyroclastic shield
- Shield volcano
- Stratovolcano
- Subglacial mound
- Submarine volcano
- Somma volcano
- Tuya
- Volcanic field
- Volcanic plug

=== Mountains with structure-controlled form ===
- Bornhardt
- Cuesta
- Dome
- Fault-block mountain
- Fold mountain
- Hogback
- Homoclinal ridge
- Table and mesa
  - Tepui (Guiana Highlands)
- Traprock mountain

=== Other types of mountain or hill ===
- Belki
- Bergsknalle
- Conical hill
- Golets (geography)
- Inselberg
- Kuppe
- Line parent
- Mound
- Mount
- Mittelgebirge
- Residual hill
- Tower karst
- Tumulus
  - Barrow (British Isles)
  - Kurgan (Eurasian Steppe)
- Ultra

== Mountains defined by their vegetation ==
- Fell
- Grass mountain
- Kalottberg

== Types of rock that make up mountains ==
- Igneous
  - Extrusive (see types of volcanoes, above)
  - Intrusive
- Metamorphic
- Sedimentary

== Groups of mountains ==
- Cordillera
- Inselberg field
- Hügelland
- Monogenetic volcanic field
- Mountain range
- Polygenetic volcanic field
- Undulating hilly land
