= Maasheybash =

Mountain in the Altai Republic, Russia

- Маашейбаш
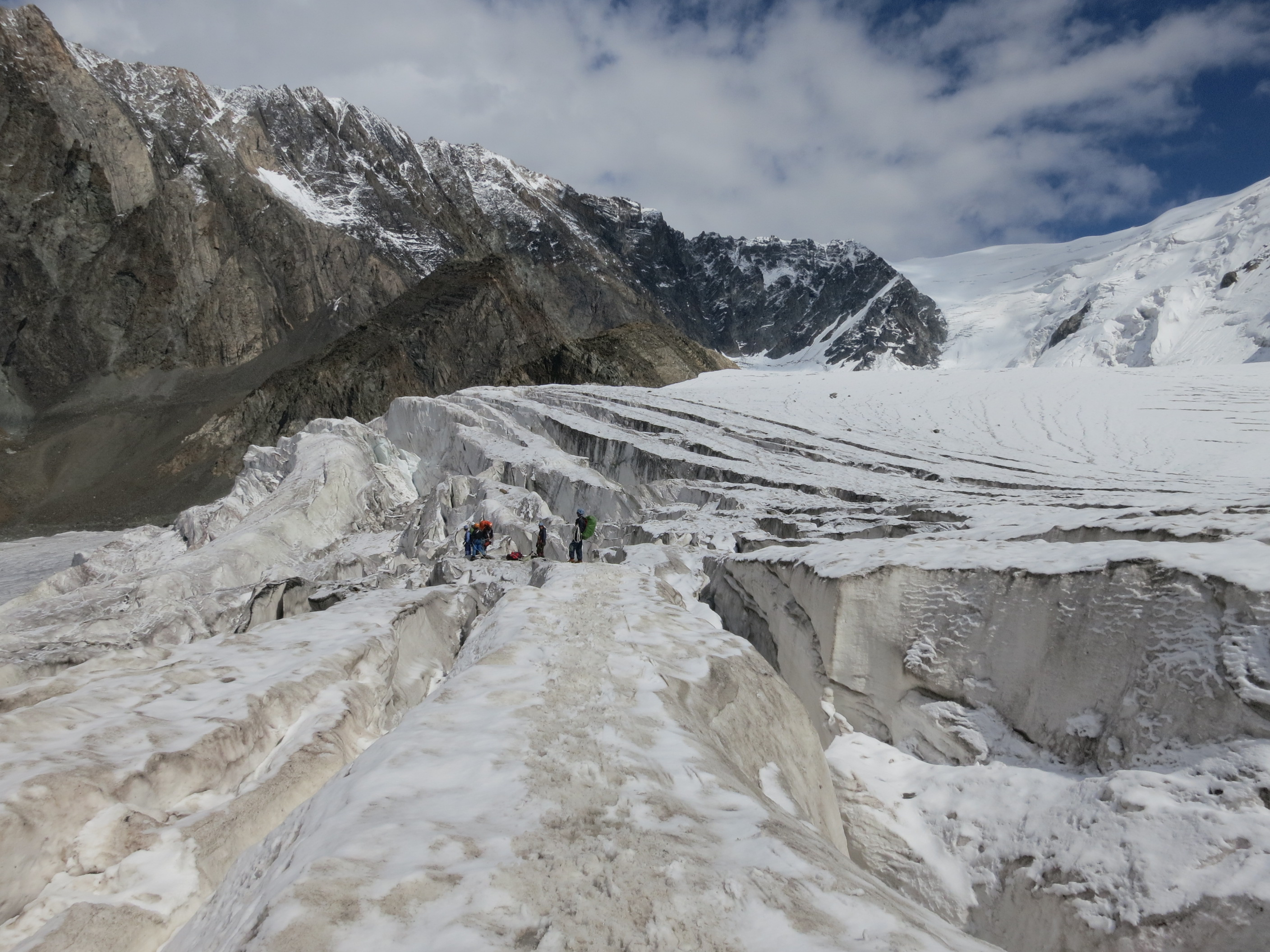
- The Maashey glacier on the slope of the Maasheybash

Highest point
- Elevation: 4,177 m (13,704 ft)
- Prominence: 1,806 m (5,925 ft)
- Coordinates: 50°03′49″N 87°34′04″E

Geography
- Location within Altai Republic
- Location: Altai Republic, Russia
- Parent range: Northern Chuya Range; Altai Mountains; South Siberian Mountains

Maasheybash (Russian: Маашейбаш) is a mountain in the Altai Republic, Russia. At 4,177 m (13,704 ft) it is the highest summit in the Northern Chuya Range, part of the Chuya Belki, Altai Mountains, South Siberian System.

The Saylyugemsky National Park is a protected area located about 15 kilometres (9.3 mi) to the west of the mountain in a straight line.

== Description ==
Maasheybash is a 4,177 metres (13,704 ft) high ultra-prominent mountain. Other sources give a height of 4,173 metres (13,691 ft).

Located in the area of Kosh-Agachsky District, it is one of the highest peaks of the Altai Mountains. The southern face has a steep cliff and on the western side the mountain gradually drops down to a height of 3,600 metres (11,800 ft). Its geological composition is lava and tuff, as well as argillaceous and siliceous shale. The Masashey glacier, as well as kurums, descend from the slopes of the mountain.

== See also ==
- List of mountains and hills of Russia
- List of ultras of Central Asia
