= Kazyr =

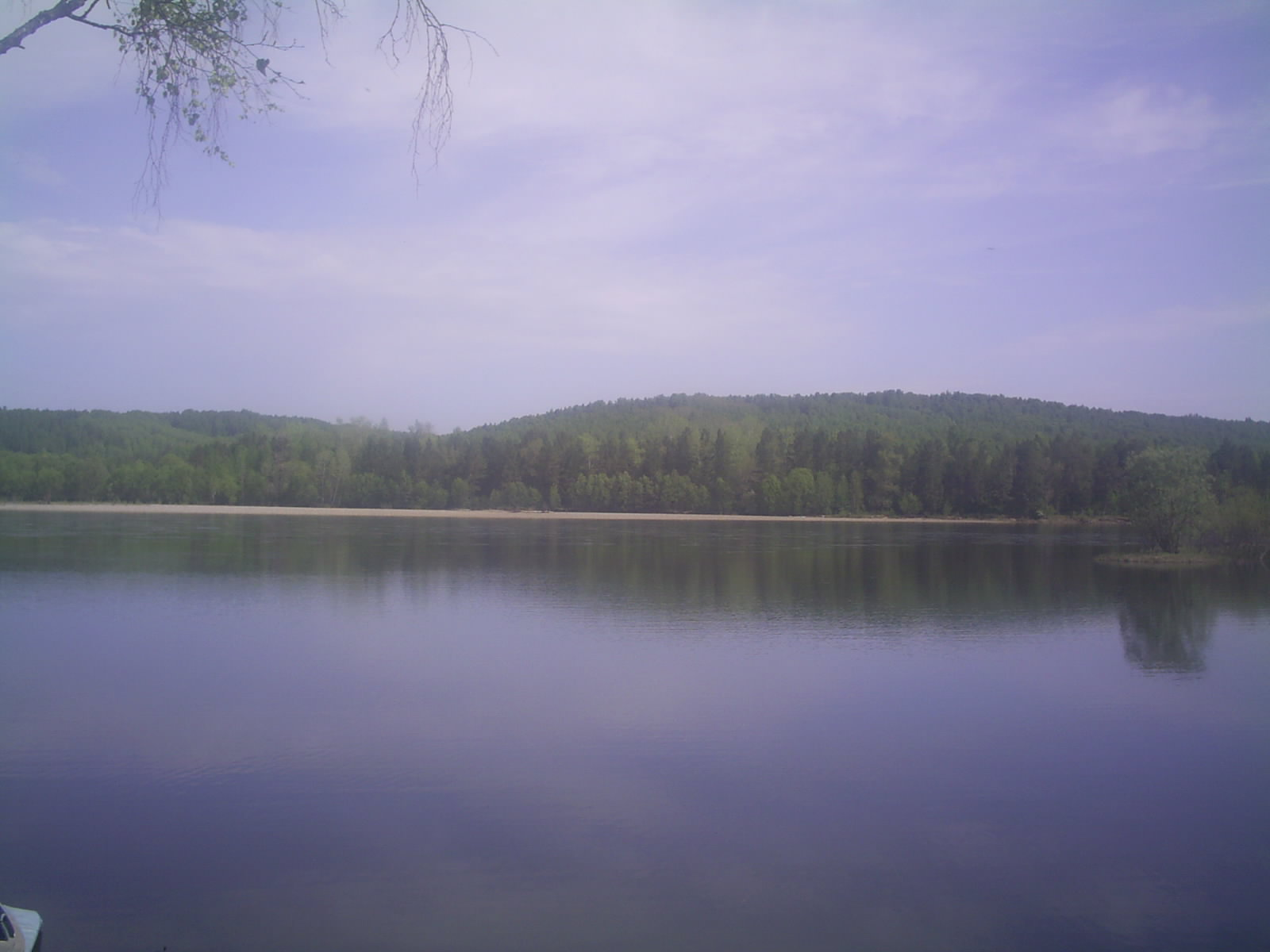

Location
- Country: Russia

Physical characteristics
- Mouth: Tuba
  - coordinates: 53°46′50″N 92°53′30″E
- Length: 388 km (241 mi)
- Basin size: 20,900 km^{2} (8,100 sq mi)

Basin features
- Progression: Tuba→ Yenisey→ Kara Sea

The Kazyr (Russian: Казыр) is a river in the Irkutsk Oblast and Krasnoyarsk Krai of Russia. At its confluence with the Amyl, the Tuba (a right tributary of the Yenisey) is formed. Its name translates from the Tuvan language as "savage". The river is 388 kilometres (241 mi) long and drains an area of 20,900 square kilometres (8,100 mi^{2}). It is covered by ice from late October to late April. The Kizir is a major tributary.
