= Saylyugemsky National Park =

National park in Russia

- Russian: Сайлюгемский
- IUCN category II (national park)
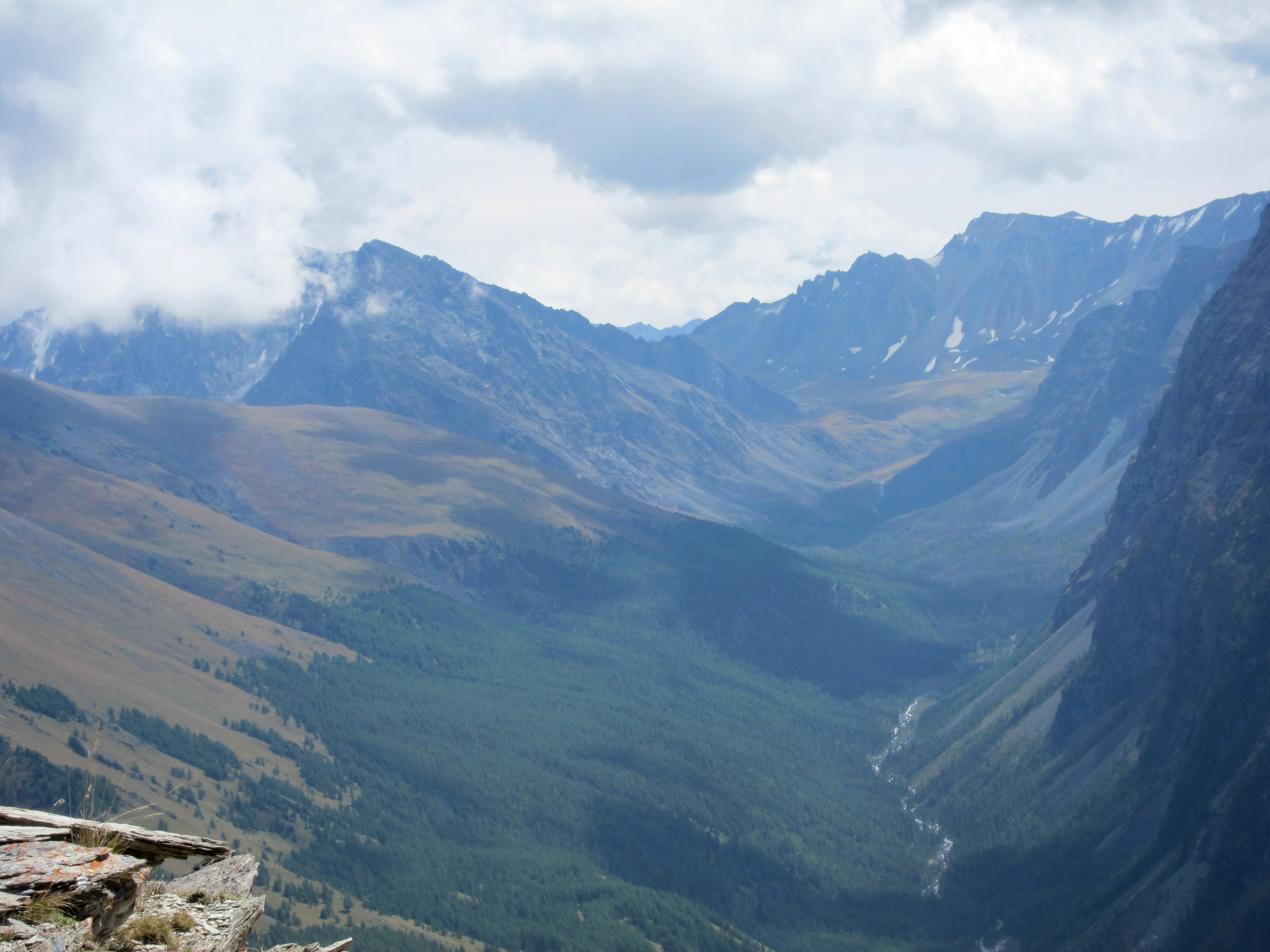
- Valley of Yungur River, Argut Sector

- Location within Russia
- Location: Altai Republic
- Nearest city: Gorno-Altaysk
- Coordinates: 49°34′N 88°19′E
- Area: 118,380 hectares (292,500 acres; 1,183.8 km^{2}; 457.1 sq mi)
- Established: 2012
- Governing body: FGBU "Saylyugmsky"
- Website: http://sailugem.ru/

Saylyugemsky National Park (Russian: Сайлюгемский (национальный парк)) sits at the mountainous "X" where the borders of Russia, Kazakhstan, Mongolia and China meet in the Altai Mountains of central Asia. Because of its remoteness and position at the meeting points of mountains, steppes, desert and forest, it is a globally important natural reserve for biodiversity. The park was formally established in 2010–2012, with a particular purpose of protecting the vulnerable Altai argali mountain sheep and the endangered Snow leopard. The component Saylyugem Mountains are a ridge of the Altai, and stretch to the northeast to the Sayan Mountains. The climate is cold and semi-arid. Administratively, the park is located in the Kosh-Agachsky District of the Altai Republic. While ecotourism has a stated role, visits to the territory currently require special passes from park administration, and activities are limited to roads and trails.

== Topography ==
The topography of Saylyugemsky is mountainous; the highest peaks range up to 3,621 metres (11,880 ft) (on the ridge Tabagiyin-Their-Ula), with glaciers on the highest ridges. Overall, the Altai are a high mountain plateau that is deeply dissected by river valleys; in places this takes the appearance of rolling hills or steppe. Spread over 118,380 hectares (457.1 sq mi), the territory consists of three sections. The "Saylyugem" and "Ulandryk" section are located close to each other on the northern slope of the Saylyugem Range, with the former sector running along the border between Russia and Mongolia. The third section, the "Argut", is on the spur of the Katun and Northern Chuya ranges. The Argut River runs through the territory. The snow line runs from 2,300 meters to 3,200 meters.

While the Saylyugem and Ulandryk sectors have experienced human habitation for millennia - with the attendant grazing and hunting, the more inaccessible Argut sector has stayed relatively pristine. The Altai mountains are at the northern edge of the region tectonically affected by the collision of India into Asia; the area is seismically active, with a major earthquake recently as the 2003 Altai earthquake. The rock types in the mountains are typically granites and metamorphic schists.

== Climate and ecoregion ==
The climate of Saylyugemsky is Cold Semi-Arid (Köppen climate classification BSk), which is typical of continental interiors far from large bodies of water. Summers are mild and dry; winters are cold and dry. In Kosh-Agach, the closest town, the average annual temperature is -1.6 °C, with an average of 5.5 inches (140 mm).

Kosh-Agach, Altai Republic (Russia)

Climate chart (precipitation, max. and min. temperature)
J	F	M	A	M	J	J	A	S	O	N	D
0.1 8 −12	0.1 13 −10	0 25 3	0.2 43 21	0.3 57 34	0.9 67 44	1.4 69 48	1 66 44	0.5 56 34	0.3 40 21	0.3 23 5	0 11 −11
- █ Average max. and min. temperatures in °F
- █ Precipitation totals in inches
- Source: Climate-date.org
Metric conversion
J	F	M	A	M	J	J	A	S	O	N	D
2.5 −13 −24	2.5 −11 −23	0 −4 −16	5.1 6 −6	7.6 14 1	23 19 7	36 21 9	25 19 7	13 13 1	7.6 4 −6	7.6 −5 −15	0 −12 −24
- █ Average max. and min. temperatures in °C
- █ Precipitation totals in mm

The ecoregion of Saylyugemsky is "Altai-Sayan", a WWF Global200 Ecoregion. This is one of the most unusual and biodiverse regions on earth, with a mosaic of mountains, steppe, forest, desert, and other habitats.).

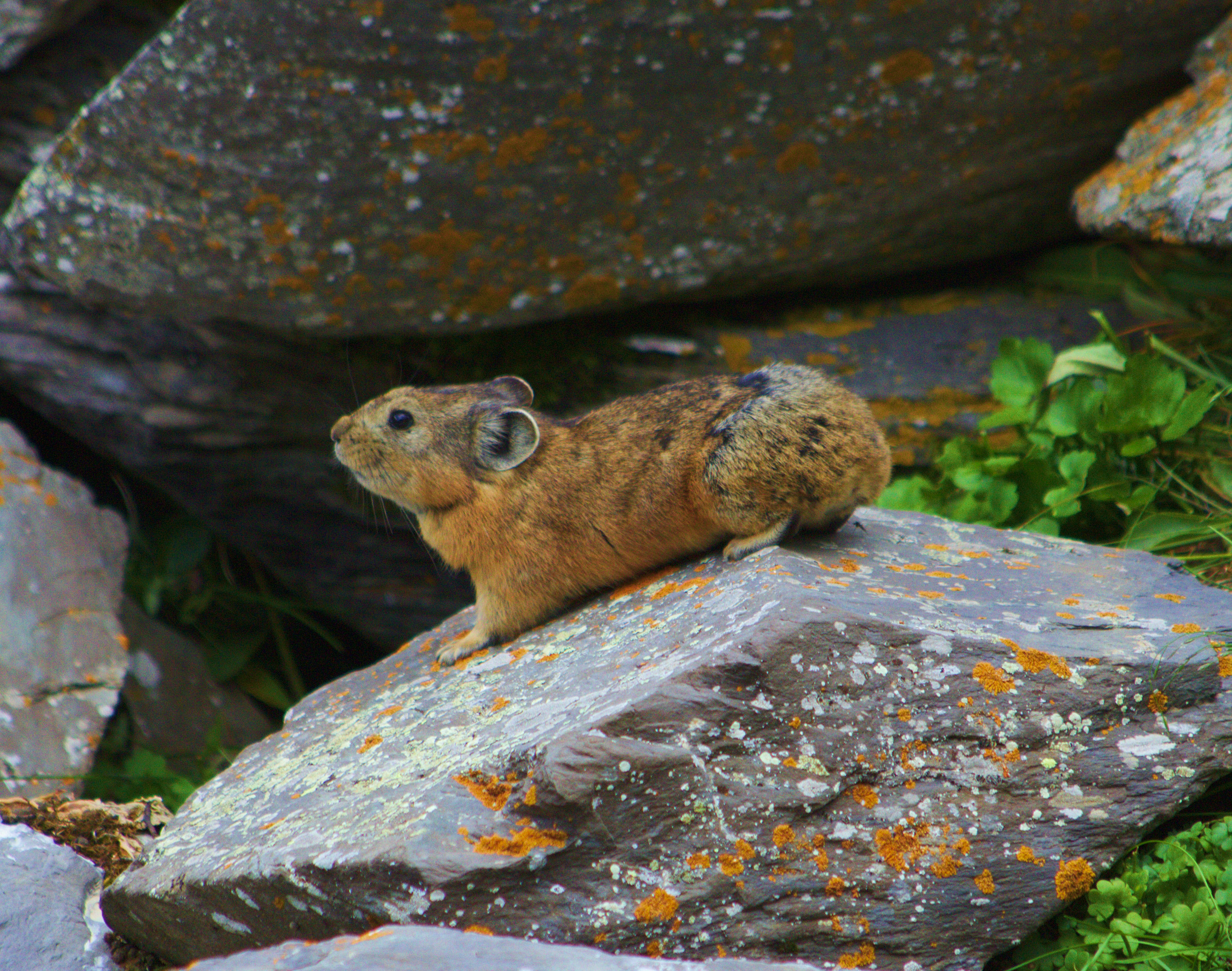
Alpine pika in the Saylugem Mountains

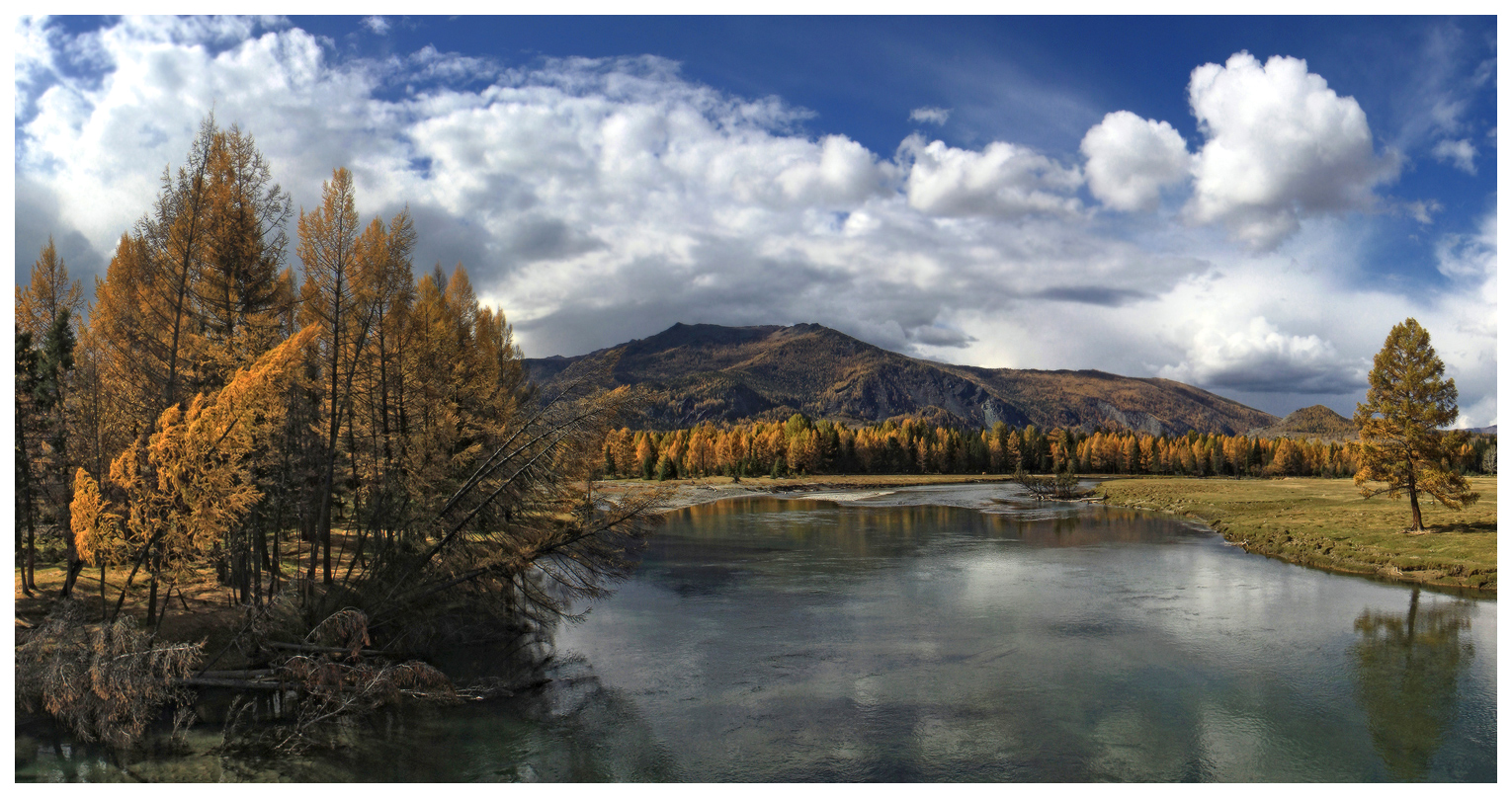

The freshwater ecoregion is species-poor: only two species of fish - Arctic grayling (Thymallus arcticus) and Alpine bullhead (Cottus poecilopus) - are found in the mountainous areas, and only four other species in the lakes and rivers in the lower tablelands. There are no endemic species. The park is in the "Chuya" freshwater ecoregion (WWF ID#604), one of the smaller freshwater ecoregions in the world. The rivers of the territory flow into the Ob River drainage basin and ultimately into the Arctic, but the aquatic ecosystem of the park appears to be mostly separate from that of the Ob itself. The rivers and streams of the area have high flow rates and rapids that keep out the migratory fish of lower regions. Because of the remoteness of the area, the freshwater ecosystem is still poorly understood.

== Plants ==
In the southern sections (Saylyugem and Ulandryk) have vegetation reflecting the type of dry western-Mongolian steppe and desert-steppe habitat found. So far, scientists have recorded 722 species of vascular plants belonging to 66 families and 232 genera; 20 plant species are classified as vulnerable in Russia. The Argut section is more alpine (larch, spruce, fir, birch, poplar, pine) and alpine-tundra in character.

== Animals ==
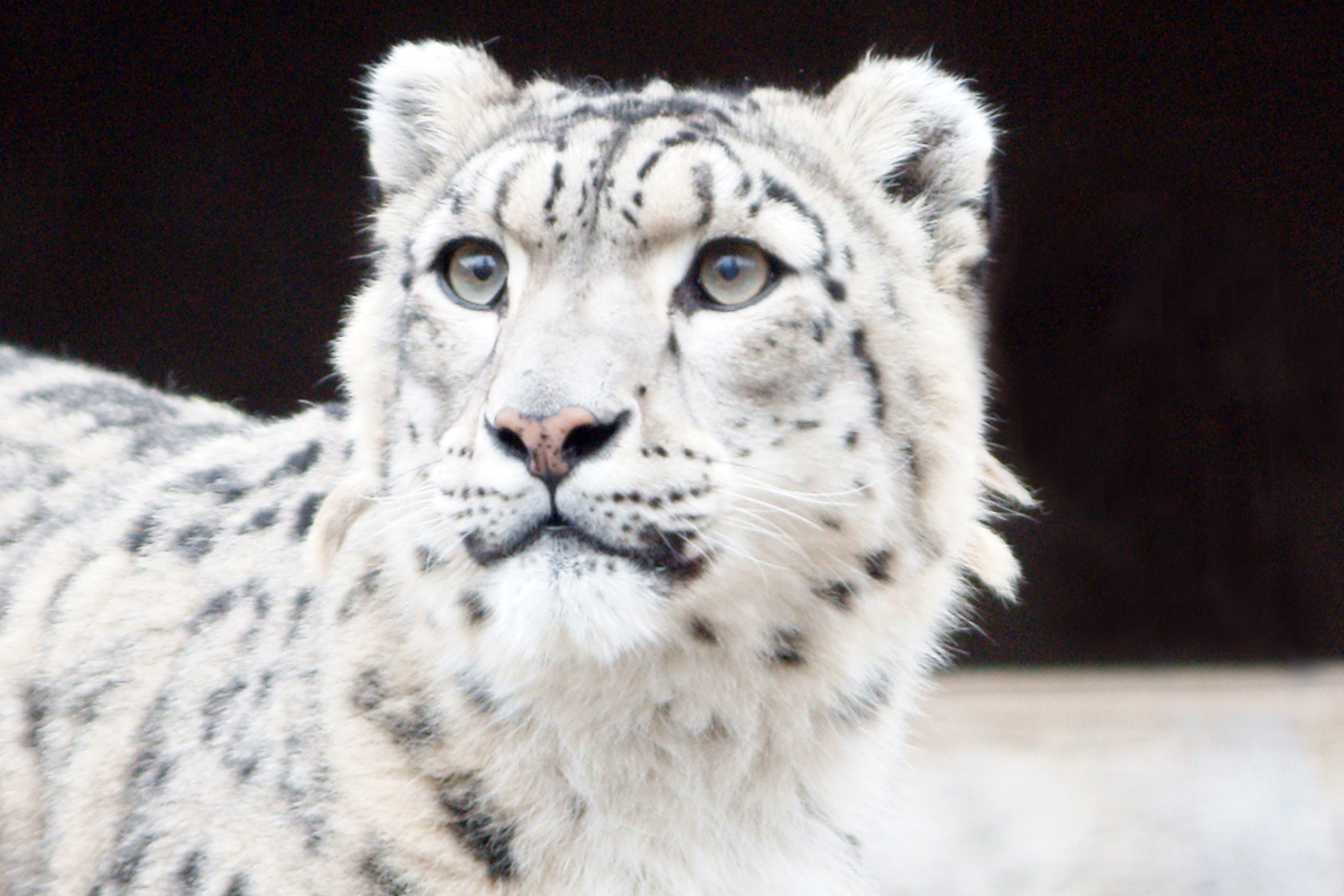
Snow Leopard in the Moscow Zoo

The snow leopard is a primary focus of the park's conservation efforts. An estimated 15-20 individuals live in the territory, with another 50-60 in the buffer areas. They live at the higher elevations in rocky settings, where their stocky bodies and thick fur make them well-adapted. Saylyugemsky is at the northern edge of their range. A primary prey of the leopard are the Altai-Sayan mountain goat (ibex), of which there are an estimated 3,200-3,700 in the park. In 2015, scientists found evidence of a rare Saylyugemsky bear, which had been thought to be extinct in the area for 30 years. Sylyugemsky is the central breeding area of the Siberian mountain goat, with groups of cross-border argali number 500-550 individuals.

The usual ungulates are found - deer and elk - with the musk deer notable because illegal trapping for their musk is done with wire snares that sometimes accidentally entrap a snow leopard.

The ridge is also a breeding area for the endangered Saker falcon, whose numbers have declined in recent years due to poaching. The southern sections of the park have recorded 146 species of birds, including the white-tailed eagle, steppe eagle, golden eagle, bearded vulture, black vulture, griffon vulture, peregrine falcon, lesser kestrel, and Altai snowcock.

== Tourism ==
As a preserve for vulnerable and endangered species and cultural sites, the park has strict restrictions on use and movement. Entry to the park requires a pass from park administrators, and visitors must stay on roads and trails.

== See also ==
- Protected areas of Russia
- Maasheybash
