= Sayan Mountains =

Mountain range in southern Siberia, Russia and northern Mongolia

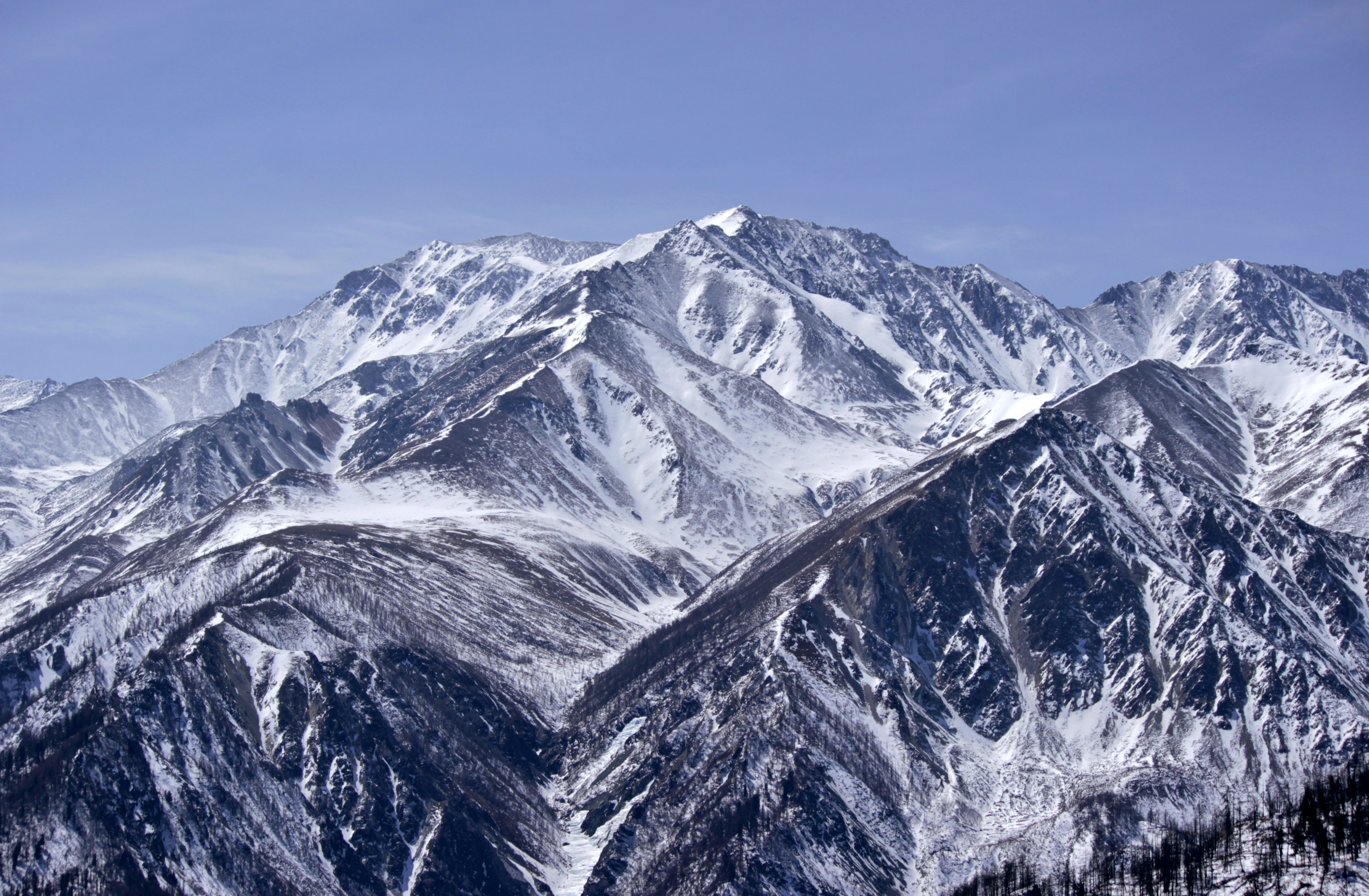
- View of Mönkh Saridag, highest peak in the Sayan Mountains

Highest point
- Peak: Mönkh Saridag
- Elevation: 3,492 m (11,457 ft)
- Coordinates: 51°43′08″N 100°36′53″E

Geography
- Location within Russia Location within Mongolia

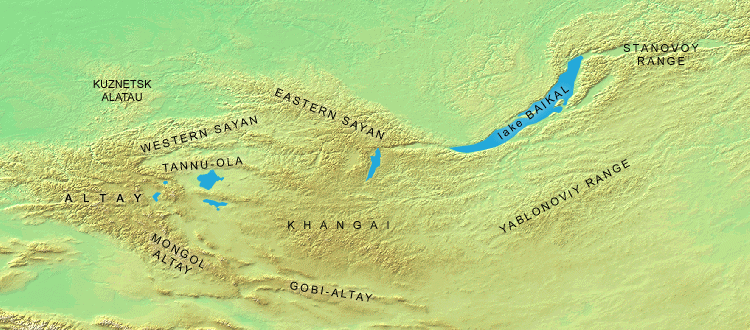
- Parent range: South Siberian Mountains

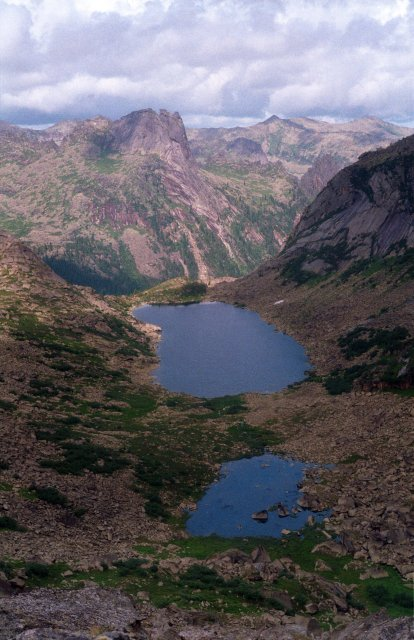
Lake of Mountain Spirits Western Sayan, Ergaki mountains

The Sayan Mountains (Russian: Саяны, romanized: Sayany; Mongolian: Соёны нуруу, romanized: Soyonii nuruu; Old Turkic: 𐰚𐰇𐰏𐰢𐰤, romanized: Kögmen) are a mountain range in southern Siberia, spanning southern Russia (Note: Buryatia, Irkutsk Oblast, Krasnoyarsk Krai, Tuva and Khakassia) and northern Mongolia. The system is traditionally divided into the Western and Eastern Sayan, culminating at Mönkh Saridag at 3,492 m (11,457 ft).

The mountains form a major watershed in Central and North Asia, giving rise to key tributaries of the upper Yenisei River and feeding into Lake Baikal. Historically, the range served as a natural border between the Russian Empire and the Qing dynasty, established in the 1727 Treaty of Kyakhta, and later between Russia and Mongolia.

== Geography ==
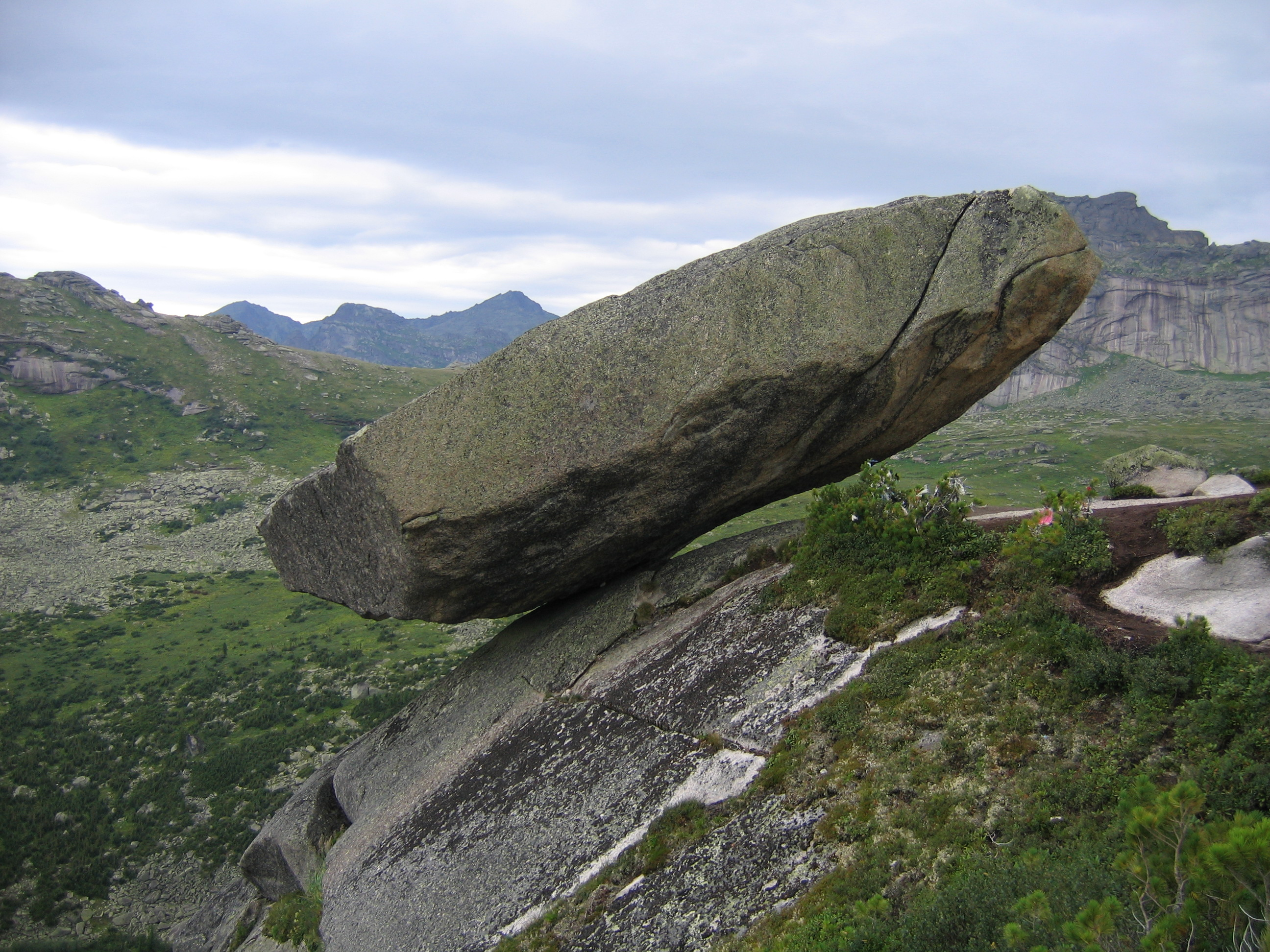
The Hanging Stone, Western Sayan, Ergaki Nature Park

=== Western Sayan ===
At 92°E the Western Sayan system is pierced by the Ulug-Khem (Russian: Улуг-Хем) or Upper Yenisei River, and at its eastern extremity it joins the Eastern Sayan. It stretches almost at a right angle to the Eastern Sayan for 650 km (400 mi) in a roughly northeast/southwest direction between the Shapshal Range of the Eastern Altai and the Abakan Range of the Kuznetsk Alatau in the west, and the Eastern Sayan in the east. From the Mongolian plateau the ascent is on the whole gentle, but from the plains of Siberia it is much steeper. The range includes a number of subsidiary ranges of an Alpine character, such as the Aradan, Borus, Oy, Kulumys, Mirsky, Kurtushibin, Uyuk, Sheshpir-Taiga, Ergak-Targak-Taiga, Kedran and Nazarovsky ranges. The most important peaks are Kyzlasov Peak (2,969 m (9,741 ft)), Aradansky Peak (2,456 m (8,058 ft)), Bedelig Golets (2,492 m (8,176 ft)), Samzhir (2,402 m (7,881 ft)), Borus (2,318 m (7,605 ft)) and Zvezdny Peak (2,265 m (7,431 ft)).

Between the breach of the Yenisei and Lake Khövsgöl at 100° 30' E. the system bears also the name of Yerghik-Taiga. The flora is on the whole poor, although the higher regions carry good forests of larch, pine, juniper, birch, and alder, with rhododendrons and species of Berberis and Ribes. Lichens and mosses clothe many of the boulders that are scattered over the upper slopes.

=== Eastern Sayan ===
The Eastern Sayan stretches almost at a right angle to the Western Sayan for 1,000 km (620 mi) in a northwest/southeast direction, from the Yenisei to the Angara Range, terminating above the depression of the Selenga-Orkhon Valley near Lake Baikal. Some subranges of the northwest form a system of "White Mountains" (Белогорье) or "Belki", such as Manskoye Belogorye, Kanskoye Belogorye, Kuturchinskoye Belogorye, as well as Agul Belki (Агульские Белки), with permanent snow on the peaks. In the central part, towards the upper reaches of the Kazyr and Kizir rivers, several ridges, such as the Kryzhin Range form a cluster culminating in the 2,922 m (9,587 ft) high Grandiozny Peak, the highest point in Krasnoyarsk Krai.

To the southeast rise the highest and most remote subranges, including the Bolshoy Sayan and Kropotkin Range, as well as "goltsy" type of mountains, such as the Tunka Goltsy, Kitoy Goltsy, and Botogolsky Goltsy, among others. The highest point of the Eastern Sayan, as well as the highest point of the whole Sayan system, 3,492 m (11,457 ft) high Mount Munku-Sardyk, is located in the range of the same name in this area. 2,939 m (9,642 ft) high Pik Tofalariya is the highest point of Irkutsk Oblast. The mountains of the Eastern Sayan characteristically display alpine relief forms. In general, rivers flowing down from the ranges form gorges and there is an abundance of waterfalls in the area.

== The Ice Age Period ==
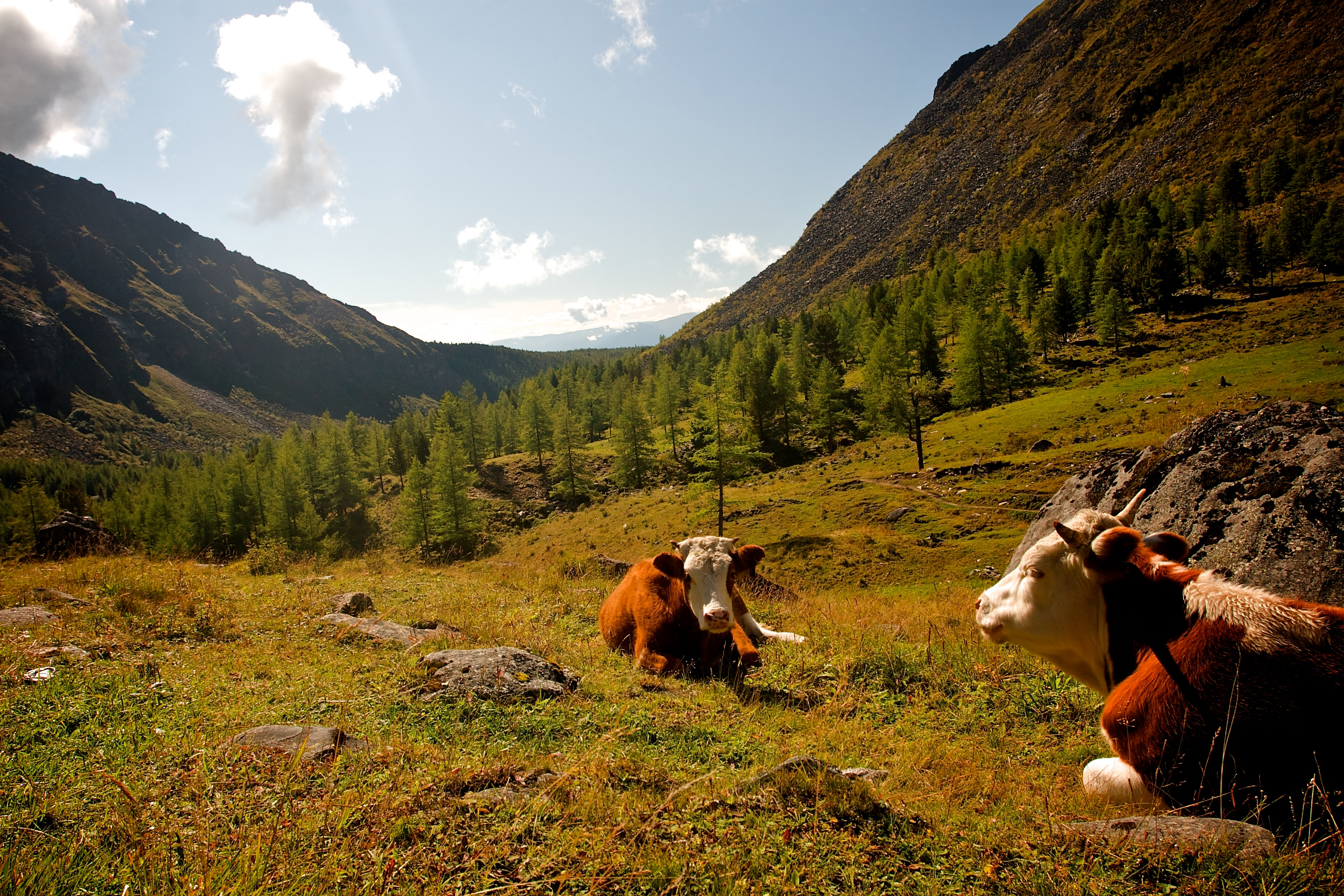
Sayan Mountains in August

In this area that currently shows only small cirque glaciers, at glacial times glaciers have flowed down from the 3492 m high Munku-Sardyk massif situated west of Lake Baikal and from the 12,100 km^{2} (4,700 sq mi) extended completely glaciated granite-gneiss plateau (2300 m asl) of the East-Sayan mountains as well as the east-connected 2600–3110 m-high summits in the Tunka Valley, joining to a c. 30 km-wide parent glacier. Its glacier tongue that flowed down to the east, to Lake Baikal, came to an end at 500 m asl (51°48’28.98"N/103°0’29.86"E). The Khamar Daban mountains were covered by a large-scale ice cap filling up the valley relief.

From its valley heads, e.g. the upper Slyudyanka valley (51°32’N/103°37’E), but also through parallel valleys like the Snezhnaya (Snirsdaja) valley, outlet glaciers flowed to the north to Lake Baikal. The Snezhnaya valley outlet glacier has calved, among other outlet glaciers, at c. 400 m asl into Lake Baikal (51°27’N/104°51’E). The glacial (Würm ice age = Last Glacial Period = MIS 2) glacier snowline (ELA) as altitude limit between glacier feeding area and ablation zone has run in these mountains between 1450 and 1250 m asl. This corresponds to a snowline depression of 1500 m against the current height of the snowline. Under the condition of a comparable precipitation ratio there might result from this a glacial depression of the average annual temperature of 7.5 to 9 °C for the Last Ice Age against today.

== Origins of reindeer husbandry ==
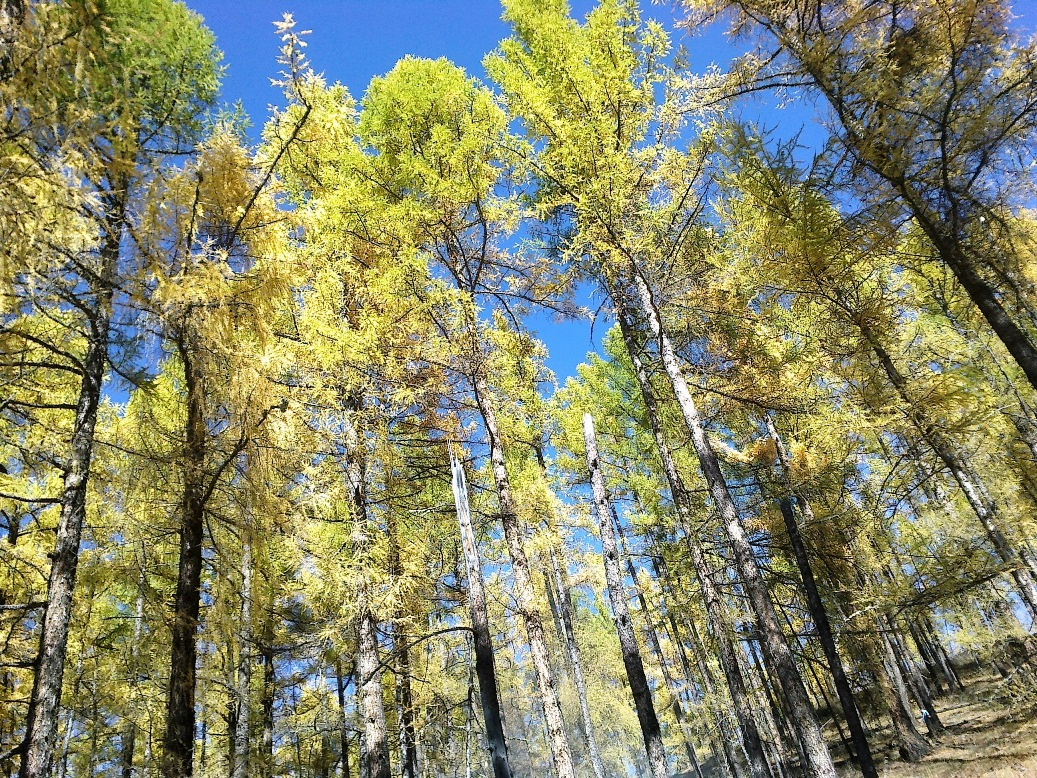
Autumn forest in the Eastern Sayan Mountains, Buryatia, Russia.

According to Sevyan Vainshtein, Sayan reindeer herding, as historically practiced by the Evenks, is "the oldest form of reindeer herding and is associated with the earliest domestication of the reindeer by the Samoyedic taiga population of the Sayan Mountains at the turn of the first millennium A.D."

The Sayan region was apparently the origin of the economic and cultural complex of reindeer hunters-herdsmen that we now see among the various Evenki groups and the peoples of the Sayan area.

The ancestors of modern Evenki groups inhabited areas adjacent to the Sayan Mountains, and it is highly likely that they took part in the process of reindeer domestication along with the Samoyedic population. The local indigenous groups that have retained their traditional lifestyle nowadays live almost exclusively in the area of the Eastern Sayan mountains. However, the local reindeer herding communities were greatly affected by russification and sovietization, with many Evenks losing their traditional lifestyle and groups like the Mator and Kamas peoples being assimilated altogether.

According to Juha Janhunen, and other linguists, the homeland of the Uralic languages is located in South-Central Siberia in the Sayan Mountains region. In 8th-century Old Turkic inscriptions, the mountains were recorded under the ancient name Kögmen (𐰚𐰇𐰏𐰢𐰤). Meanwhile, Turkologist Peter Benjamin Golden locates the Proto-Turkic Urheimat in the southern taiga-steppe zone of the Sayan-Altay region. Alternatively, the Proto-Uralic homeland is located farther westwards (e.g. in the Volga-Kama region) while the Proto-Turkic homeland is located farther eastwards (e.g. "in the southern fringe of the [Northern Eurasian Greenbelt] in Northeast Asia ... near eastern Mongolia").

== Science ==
The Sayan Solar Observatory is located in these mountains (51°37′18″N 100°55′07″E) at an altitude of 2,000 meters.

== See also ==
- Abakan River
- Ergaki
- Geography of Siberia
- Lykov family
- Mana River
- Minusinsk Depression
- Tuva Depression
- Altai-Sayan region
