= Saidalim Tanekeyev =

Soviet politician (b. 1925)

Saidalim Nysanbayuly Tanekeyev
- Born: August 5, 1925; Chundzha, Kazak ASSR, Soviet Union
- Died: April 19, 2017 (aged 91) Almaty, Kazakhstan
- Buried: The Kensai-1 Memorial Cemetery, Almaty
- Allegiance: Soviet Union; Kazakhstan
- Education: Higher education (KazSU, History Faculty; Agricultural Institute, Agricultural and Economics Faculty; HPS, Alma-Ata)
- Service years: 1942–2017
- Activities: Veteran and disabled person of the Great Patriotic War, party, economic and social activities, writer
- Awards: Orders; Order of the Patriotic War 1st class(2); Order of the Patriotic War 2nd class Order of the Red Star; Medal "For the Capture of Berlin"; Medal "For the Liberation of Warsaw"; Medal "For the Victory over Germany in the Great Patriotic War 1941–1945"; Order of the Red Banner of Labour(4); Order of the Badge of Honour(2); Order of Parasat; Order of Honour of the Mongolian People's Republic; Medals; Badge "Veteran of War"; Medal "Veteran of Labour"; Medal "For the Development of Virgin Lands"; Medals not listed in "Honours and Awards"; Medal "50 years of Kyzylorda region" Medal "50 years of the ALCUY " Medal "50 years of the USSR"; Medal of Abay Kunanbayev; Medal "50 years of the Eastern Border District"; NOC Badge of Honor; Medal "25 years of Victory"; Medal "the USSR Exhibition of Economic Achievements"(3); Medal "For success in the national economy of the USSR"; Jubilee Medal of Georgy Zhukov; Silver Medal of S.P.Korolyov of the USSR AS (for participation in the Baikonur cosmodrome work); Medal "Sauap"; Medal Soviet Committee of War Veterans; Medal "For the Liberation of Belorussia". The Republic of Belarus. 2017; Medal "For participation in the battles of the Great Patriotic War 1941–1945"

Saidalim Nysanbayuly Tanekeyev (Kazakh: Сәйдәлім Нысанбайұлы Тәнекеев, Säidälım Nysanbaiūly Tänekeev; Russified:Танекеев Сайдалим Нысанбаевич); August 5, 1924 (1925), – April 19, 2017) was a Soviet statesman and party leader, participant and disabled veteran of the Great Patriotic War, writer, prominent public figure of the Kazakh SSR and the Republic of Kazakhstan.

== Biography ==
=== Early life ===
He was born on August 5, 1925, in Chundzha (Shonzhy) village, Semirechenskaya region, Kyrgyz ASSR, RSFSR, USSR, to a family of rural teacher Nysanbay Tanekeuly and Zhanlis Zhakypkyzy, his wife of his second marriage.

In 1940/41 academic year he worked as a primary school teacher of Uyghur RDPE.

In April 1942, at the age of less than seventeen, he graduated from secondary school with honors in Aksu village of the Uyghur district in Almaty region and then added one year to his age. On May 1, 1942, he volunteered the Red Army.

=== World War II ===
In June–July 1942, he studied and graduated from the regimental school for junior commanders with the assignment of military rank to senior sergeant and was sent to the front in the army in the Stalingrad area.

However, in the middle of August 1942, as a warrior with a secondary education, he was recalled from the unit and sent to study at the Tashkent Military Rifle and Mortar School located in Termez city of the Uzbek SSR. In June 1943, he graduated from this school with the assignment of the rank of junior lieutenant.

From June 1943 to May 9, 1945, he participated in battles at fronts of the Great Patriotic War with breaks for recovery from injury:

– In July–September 1943, as commander of a rifle platoon, 212th rifle regiment, 77th Guards Rifle Division of the 61st army, he participated in battles on the northern face of the Kursk Salient, then – in offensive operations on the Smolensk direction

– From July 1944, as commander of a tank destroyers’ separate platoon of the same unit, he took part in battles for the liberation of Belarus and Eastern Poland (the 1st Belorussian Front, Operation Bagration), and in February 1945 – in battles for the liberation of Warsaw and other territories of Poland.

– In May 1945, as company commander, he took part in battles for the capture of Berlin; reached the Reichstag and signed on its wall. After victory from May 1945 to March 1946, he served in the Soviet Occupation Forces in Germany at the Commandant's Service (he was a commandant of Stolberg), then returned to the USSR. In March 1947, he retired from the Soviet Army as disabled person of the Great Patriotic War.

=== Postwar ===
In September 1947, he entered the full-time study of the Kazakh State University (KazSU), History Faculty. In February 1949, he went to externe status to participate in the national economy restoration.

From March 1949 to February 1950, he worked as an instructor, then (until November 1951) – a department head for Uyghur District Committee of the Communist Party of Kazakhstan. In June 1952, he graduated from the Kazakh State University with honors.

In August 1952, he was elected the Second Secretary for Dzhambul District Party Committee of Alma-Ata region of the Kazakh SSR.

In December 1954, he was elected the chairman for the Executive Committee of the Ili District Council of People's Deputies (Talgar). In October 1956, he was elected the First Secretary for Uighur District Committee of the Communist Party of Kazakhstan.

In June 1959, at the time of Taldy-Kurgan and Alma-Ata regions’ merger, he was appointed the Chief of Alma-Ata Regional Department for Culture – the time of the rise of Kazakh national culture; he maintained friendly relations with many of its personalities.

In June 1960, he was elected the First Secretary for Panfilovsky District Committee of the Communist Party of Kazakhstan.

In January 1963, he was elected a secretary of Kzyl-Orda Regional Party Committee, and in July of the same year – the Second Secretary for Kzyl-Orda Regional Committee of the Communist Party of Kazakhstan. That time he entered the correspondence study of the Kazakh Agricultural Institute, Agricultural and Economy Faculty in Alma-Ata (he graduated from four courses).

- From The "Gold" of Party article:

– I didn't want to go to Kzyl-Orda. I was a Secretary of Panfilovsky District Party Committee, raising corn much to Khrushchev's delight, moreover I was considering as a candidate to Alma-Ata country regional party committee's Secretary position. In opposite in Kzyl-Orda there were leper-lazaret and insane hospital, outhouse etc.. No joy at all. Later on I had got an appointment with Yusupov, then-secretary of the Central Committee. It was a short chat.

– Are you communist? – asked me Yusupov. I silently nodded. – Any question?

– No

– Bon voyage.

In February 1974, he was transferred and appointed the First Deputy Chairman of the People's Control of Kazakh SSR.

In July 1978, he was elected the chairman of the board of Consumer Society Union of Kazakhstan (Kazpotrebsoyuz). In December 1985, got retired due to pension age.

From 1963 until 1986 – a Deputy of the Supreme Soviet of Kazakh SSR continuously and elected to the Central Committee of the Communist Party of Kazakhstan.

From 1980 until 1986 – a member of the Central Committee of the World Co-operative Alliance (WCA).

Founder and from December 1988 until July 2009 he was pro-bono Chairman of the Kazakhstan Voluntary Society of Disabled Persons Non-state Union.

After retirement he got actively involved with authorship although hitherto was an editor of Rice of Kazakhstan (opening chapter, 1968) and Reflection on Cooperatives (1979) books and issued his first fiction Қиян асу (Steep Paths, 1979). A member of the Union of Writers of Kazakhstan, member if the Board of Literary Fund.

He died April 19, 2017 in Almaty, Republic of Kazakhstan.

== Literary works ==
- Steep Paths ("Қиян асу"). Short novel. Zhazushy, Almaty, 1979.
- Elan ("Серпiн"). Novel. Zhalyn, Almaty, 1991.
- 1916. Yereuiltobe. As the case was ("1916. Ереуілтөбе әсерлері"). Atamura-Kazakhstan, Almaty, 1994.
- Neks ("Бел-белес"). Short novels and stories in two volumes. Shartarap, Almaty, 1997.
- Tortuous Path ("Иір-қиыр, бұраң жол"). Essay-novel. Almaty, 1999.
- Heart Wound. In honor of 60th Anniversary of Victory in the Great Patriotic War ("Жүрекке түскен жара. Ұлы Отан соғысы Жеңісіне 60 жыл"). Short novel. Sanat, Almaty, 2001.
- Оh, Heart, My Heart ("Жүрегім, менің жүрегім"). Book of poems. Kazakh University, Аlmaty, 2001.
- 1916. Alban's Uprising in Karkara ("1916. Қарқара – албан көтерілісі"). Economy, Almaty, 2002.
- The Legend of the Cog. Murager, Almaty, 2006.
- Tortuous Path (Talk with a Great son) ("Иір-иір, қиыр жол (немеремен сырласу)"). Nurly Alem, Almaty, 2006.
- The view. Sanat, Almaty, 2007.
- What the Chronicles tell about ("Шежіре не сыр шертеді"). Arys, Almaty, 2008.

He is an author over 150 articles and essays; in 1980th he wrote a booklet in Russian Our Pedigree with the family genealogy for his great kids; took an active part in data collection for the fundamental book – "Albans’ clan genealogy Family Tree of predecessor Baidibek. Albans’ Genealogical Legacy" ("Бәйдібек Баба Алып Бәйтерек. Албан ата ұрпақтары шежіресі"). Poligraphcombinat, Almaty, 2011.

== Honours and awards ==
=== Orders ===
==== Military: ====
Order of the Patriotic War 1st class
Order of the Patriotic War 1st class
Order of the Patriotic War 2nd class
Order of the Red Star
Medal "For the Capture of Berlin"
Medal "For the Liberation of Warsaw"
Medal "For the Victory over Germany in the Great Patriotic War 1941–1945"

==== Received in Peacetime: ====
Order of the Red Banner of Labour
Order of the Red Banner of Labour
Order of the Red Banner of Labour
Order of the Red Banner of Labour
Order of the Badge of Honour
Order of the Badge of Honour
Order of Parasat

=== Medals ===
Medal "For the Development of Virgin Lands"
Medal "20 Years of the Independence of the Republic of Kazakhstan"
Medal "10th Anniversary of the Constitution of the Republic of Kazakhstan"
Jubilee Medal "60 Years of the Armed Forces of the USSR"
Jubilee Medal "50 Years of Victory in the Great Patriotic War 1941–1945"
Jubilee Medal "60 Years of Victory in the Great Patriotic War 1941–1945"
Jubilee Medal "65 Years of Victory in the Great Patriotic War 1941–1945"
Medal "10 Years of the Independence of the Republic of Kazakhstan"
Medal "10 years of Astana"
Jubilee Medal "In Commemoration of the 100th Anniversary of the Birth of Vladimir Ilyich Lenin"
Medal "50 Years of the Virgin Lands"
Badge "Veteran of War"
Medal For 10 Years Military Service
Medal For 15 Years Military Service
Medal "Veteran of Labour"

=== Awards ===
Certificates of Honor (four) and the Diploma of the Supreme Soviet of the Kazakh SSR
Honor badge of International Co-operative Alliance (ICA)
Gratitude of the Kazakhstan President for work in the public headquarters of the election campaign
Memorial badge of the Hero of the Soviet Union, Khalyk Kaharmany, Army General Sagadat K.Nurmagambetov

== Honorary Titles ==
- Kazakhstan Elder Statesman
- Honorary Freeman of Almaty Region
- Honorary Freeman of Panfilovskiy District, Almaty Region
- Honorary Freeman of Talgarskiy District, Almaty Region

== Memory ==
- In Notebook 17th of his memoirs "Nonsense weaving" Gerold Belger wrote:

He is a veteran of the Great Patriotic War. Major party and soviet figure, undergraduate with the major in history. Currently nearly 90 years. Brisk and full of energy although see poorly and is a little deaf. Makes long 4-5-hour walk every day. Lots of kith. Horse memory – remembers everything. Speaks as Chrysostom – you listen with delight. Is the author of few books. So during his walks around Park Panfilov's Twenty-Eight Guardsmen and along Chokan's alley people from all sides constantly approach him, greet him gently, ask амандық-саулық, wish him a long life.

… Strong monk! Speaks sense.

- From the article of Kenes Makhambetov, Director of Internal Administrative Department of the Ministry of Labor and Social Protection – "Honest Name and Unspotted Honor", Kzylorda Vestiaire, May 18, 2017:

40 days have passed sine Seidalim Tanekeyev, prominent public and state figure who made a lot both for Priaralye and Kazakhstan in general development, was not longer with us…. Seidalim Nysanbayevich who was responsible for the region's personnel policy and rural sector development took major and scrupulous measures in the area. Primary focus was on recruiting, staffing and education of senior executives. Managerial capacity for candidates was reviewed, they received specific assignments and examined on practical tasks. Doors of the First and Second Secretaries of the Regional Party Committee had been opened for every resident of the region. Anyone can visit them without ceremonies and express and give a feedback on any issue. This is memory of that time from Ruben Andriasyan, People's Artist of Kazakhstan, currently Art Director of the State Academic Russian Drama Theater named after M.Y. Lermontov who was Kyzylorda Regional Kazakh Drama Theater back then "Due to youth of senior executives atmosphere was extremely democratic… And they always listen their visitors with due attention! Later on I had occasions went through the halls of power in other regions – and atmosphere there greatly defer from what we had in Kzylorda in those days".

In many respects it was the result of Seidalim Nysanbayevich managerial talent.

- Director of International Chess Club "Opening", International Master, Honored coach of the RK O.I. Dzyuban wrote in booklet of S.N. Tanekeyev Memorial Competition:

He frequently recalled as attended tournament for World Chess Champion title when happened to be in Moscow back in 1948. Takeaways from top-rated players’ chess and joy of chess become lifetime experience. Saidalim Nysanbayevich was especially sensitive and gracious about younger generation, he found ways to sell rate success of the one or another chess player both with a worm word and nice present. I particularly remember one of his greetings at the International Chess Club Opening after Women's Pre-New Year Tournament whereat Zhansaya Abdumalik – future four-time Chess champion in various age divisions – got prize and heard parting words from Aqsaqal.

After collapse of the USSR Kazakhstan Chess players got a chance to perform for their own country at the World Chess Olympiad in Manila (Philippines) as independent picked teams of men and women. Unfortunately Ministry of Sport had no money for the trip and only through Honorary President of Chess Federation Olzhas Suleimenov and Saidalim Tanekeyev help it came off.

- Bio articles about Saidalim Tanekeyev:
  - Saidalim Tanekeyev. Honorable People of Kazakh Land. (Мақала Сәйдәлім Тәнекеев. Алаштың ардагер азаматтары. Көрнекті қоғам қайраткері, дербесзейнеткер). Alma-Ata's region. Volume 1, pages 90–91.
  - Saidalim Tanekeyev. Revered People of Kazakhstan Land. (Қазақ жерінің зиялы азаматтары). A series of biographical collections. XX volume. Republic of Kazakhstan, pages 452–455.

== Family ==
Spouse: Sharbanu Tanekeyeva (April 17, 1929 – March 7, 2004). Married from 1948 until her death.
Children: Aisha (1949—2001), Aigul (1951), Talgat (1953), Aida (1954), Maksat (1957).
Grand children: Saule, Askar (Aisha); Zhuldyz (Aigul); Madina, Zhamilya (Talgat); Yermek, Daniya, Aigerim (Maksat).

== Literature ==
- Honorable People of Kazakh Land. (Алаштың ардагер азаматтары). Alma-Ata's region. Nisa, Almaty, 1996.
- Revered People of Kazakhstan Land. (Қазақ жерінің зиялы азаматтары). A series of biographical collections. XX volume. "Dәuir", Almaty, 2013.
