= Tectonics of the Tian Shan =

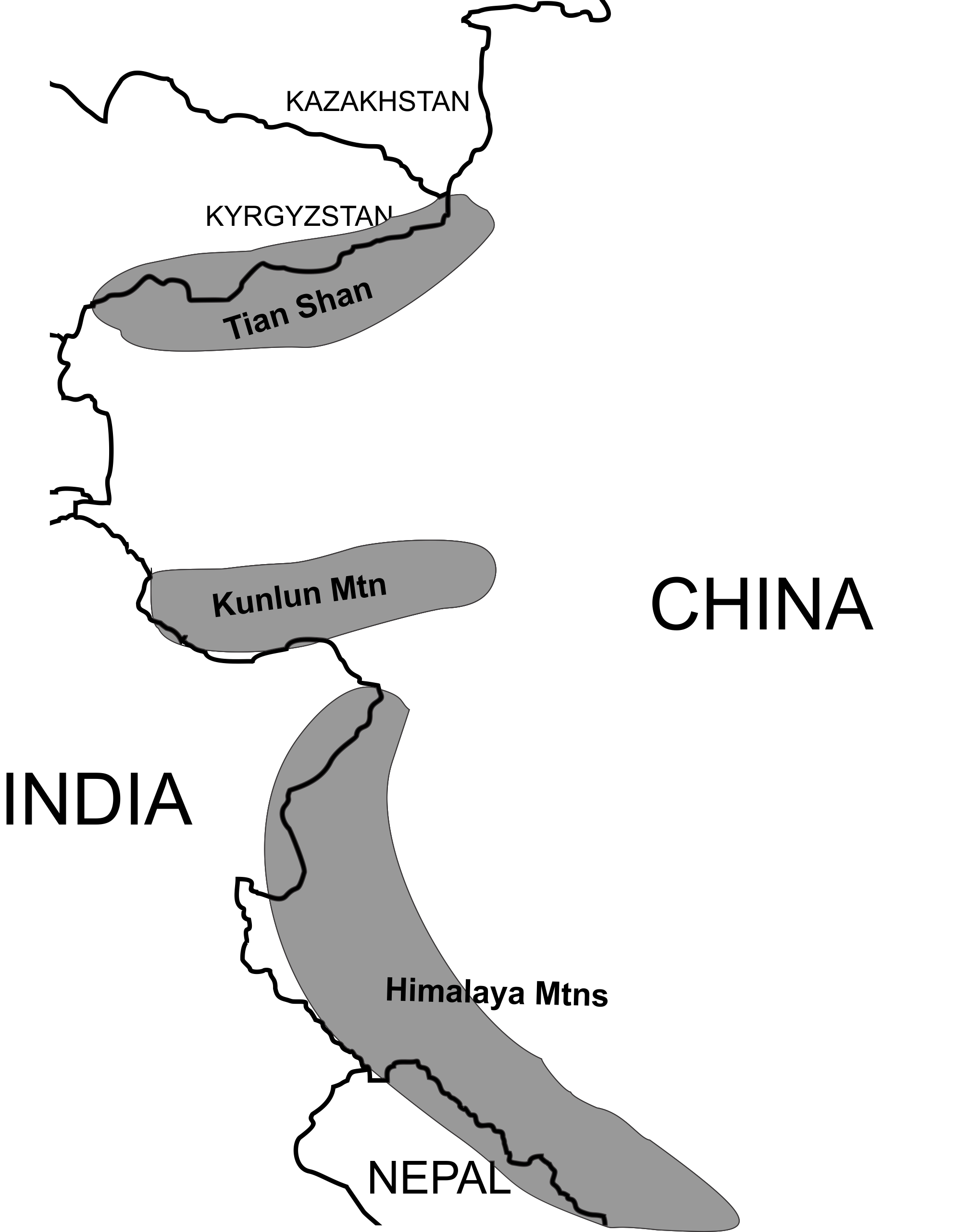
A regional map highlighting the relative locations of major orogenic belts in central Asia.

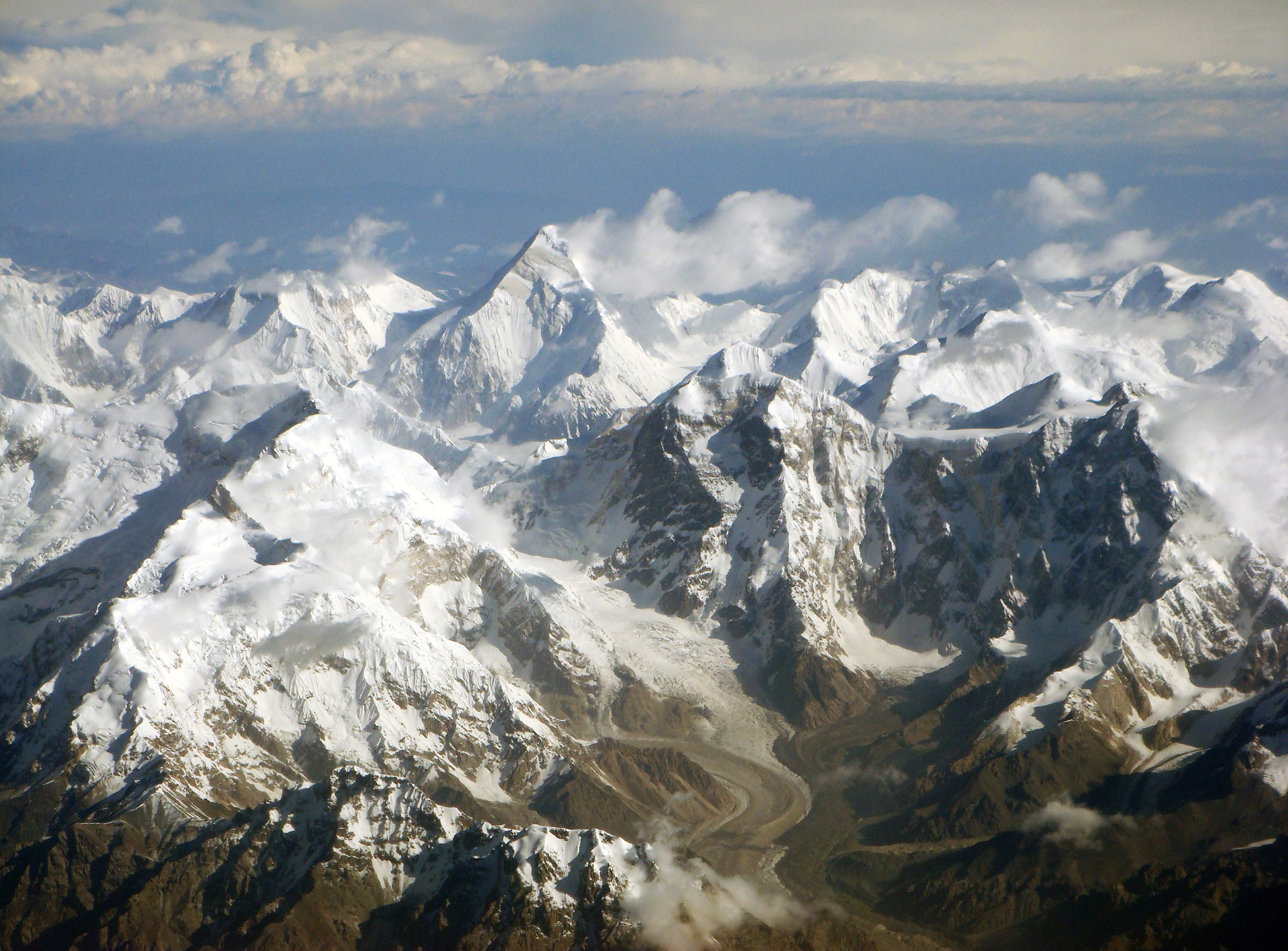
West Tian Shan mountains

The Tian Shan is a mountain range in central Asia that extends through western China, Kazakhstan, and Kyrgyzstan. The Tian Shan is 2,800 kilometres (1,700 mi) long, and up to 7,400 metres (24,300 ft) high. Throughout the Tian Shan there are several intermontane basins separated by high ranges. Plate tectonic theory makes the assumption that deformation is concentrated along plate boundaries. However, active deformation is observed in the Tian Shan, far from plate boundaries. This apparent contradiction of plate tectonic theory makes the Tian Shan a key place to study the dynamics of intracontinental deformation.

== Tectonic history ==
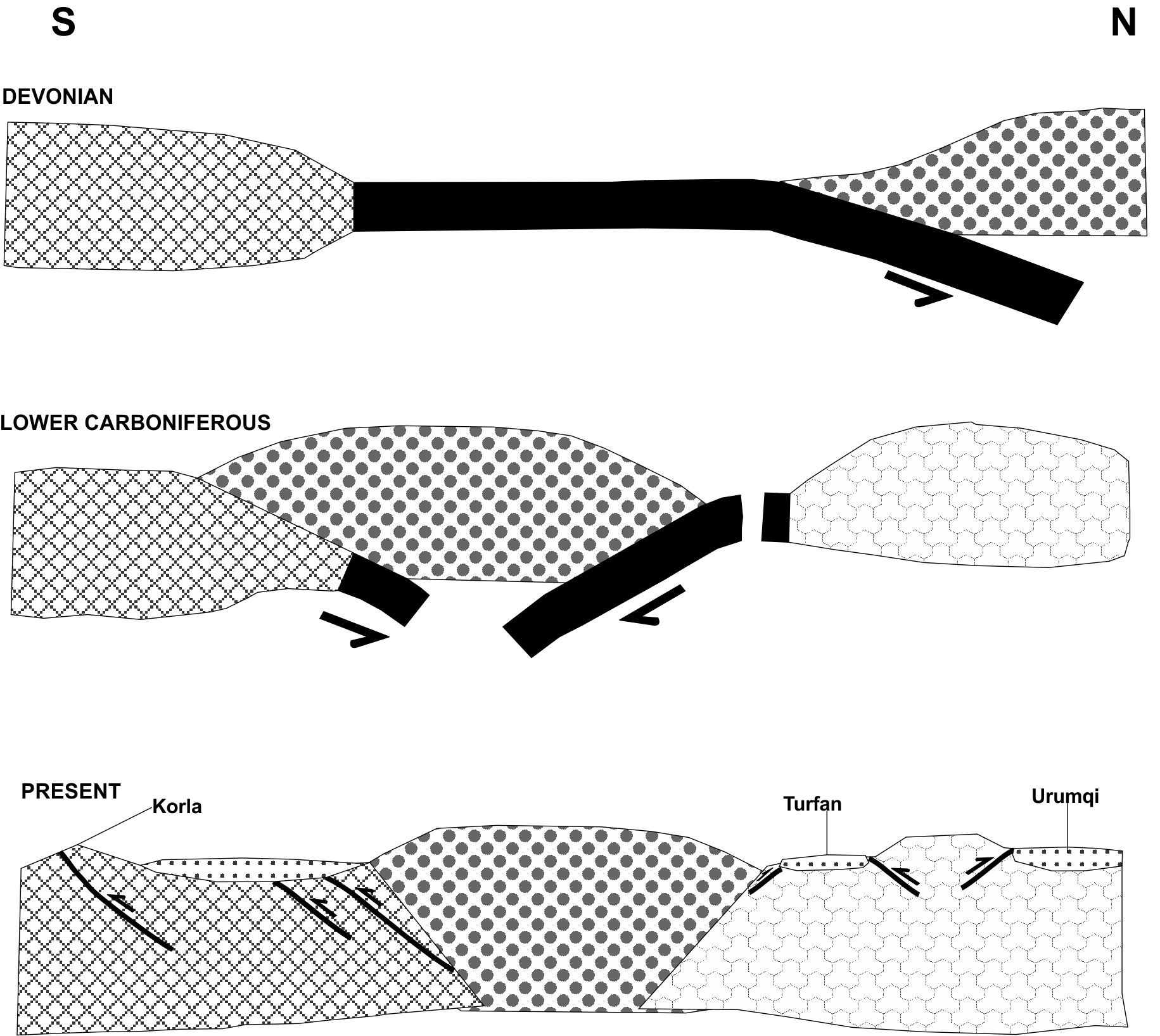
Simplified depiction of the Chinese Tian Shan's tectonic history. The oceanic crust is shown in black. The patterned areas represent blocks of continental crust. Modified from Windley et al. 1990.

The intracontinental weakness of Asia's interior has caused deformation in the Tian Shan Range after the collision of India into Asia. However, the Tian Shan was uplifted prior to the Cenozoic Indo-Asia collision.

=== Paleozoic ===
The Tian Shan contains two late Paleozoic sutures. The older, southern suture marks the collision of a passive margin at the north of the Tarim block and an active continental margin; subduction under the latter was to the north. The late Paleozoic continent-continent collision along Tarim's northern margin created an orogenic belt along the southern part of the Tian Shan. The younger, northern suture separates a northern Carboniferous island arc from an active continental margin developed over a south-dipping subduction zone.

=== Mesozoic ===
Several fragments and island arcs collided with Asia's southern margin in the Mesozoic, creating deformation and uplift in the Tian Shan and Kunlun Shan, respectively to the north and south of the Tarim Basin. Mesozoic deformation was minor or absent in most of the basin interior of the Tarim.

=== Cenozoic ===
The collision of India with Asia is the latest major tectonic event to affect deformation in the Tian Shan. Thrust faulting is the predominant style of Cenozoic deformation in the Tian Shan, which propagated outward and rose progressively as a wedge-shaped block. Dextral NW-SE trending strike slip faults either merge with or crosscut east–west trending thrust systems. The Talas-Fergana Fault is the longest of these structures. Active deformation in the Tian Shan is the result of compressional stresses generated at the Indo-Asia collisional zone, where the Himalayas formed and continue to grow. Active deformation is observed in the Tian Shan, which is within Asia's continental interior, because Asia is not as internally rigid as the continental crust is expected to be.

== Velocity field ==
Using geodetic techniques, GPS networks have been used in research to constrain the velocity field throughout the Tian Shan. This type of analysis helps illustrate the distribution of shortening rates throughout the region. Most of the convergence between the Tarim Basin and the Kazakh Platform is absorbed within the Tian Shan, with localized zones of shortening at rates of ~2 mm/yr to 6 mm/yr. The total amount of convergence in the Tian Shan is not uniformly distributed across the range, with 80–90% of the north–south shortening absorbed along the southern and northern edges, and relatively little deformation accommodated within the interior. The Chinese Tian Shan displays lateral variations in magnitudes of deformation, estimates range from 2.12 to 21 km of crustal shortening. Slip rates on NW-SE trending strike-slip faults range from 1–4 mm/yr. Slip rates on WE-SN trending gently-dipping detachment fault vary from 10 to 13 mm/yr for the southwest Tian Shan to 2–5 mm/y for eastern Tian Shan. The velocity field indicates that the Tarim Basin is thrusting beneath the Tian Shan at ~4–7 mm/yr. The velocity field also places a bound of ~4 mm/yr on the rate of crustal shortening across the Chatkal and neighboring ranges on the northwest margin of the Ferghana Valley, and they limit the present day slip rate on the right lateral Talas-Ferghana Fault to less than ~2 mm/yr

== Geologic subdivisions ==
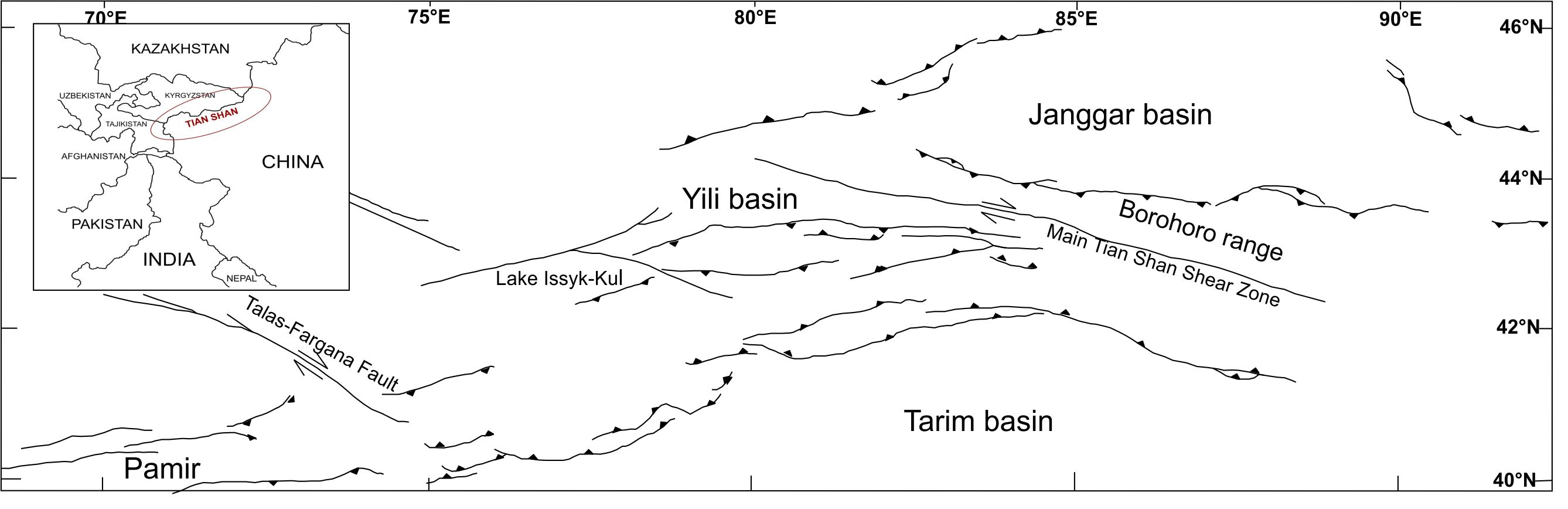
General Tectonic Map of the Tian Shan modified from Jolivet (2010). The Kazakh Platform is to the northwest (not shown).

=== Kuqa Foreland ===
The Kuqa Basin is bounded by the Tarim Basin to the south and the Tian Shan orogenic belt to the north. The Kuqa depression was probably part of the north Tarim continental margin at the Paleozoic time. Under compressive tectonic loading and gravitational loading, the Kuqa depression became an intra-continental foreland basin. The cross-section of the basin is asymmetric and its depositional center lies close to the Tian Shan orogenic belt, the sediment thickness thins towards the Tarim craton.

=== Borohoro Range ===
To the north, the Borohoro Range separates the Yili Basin from the North Tian Shan piedmont in the Junggar Basin. On the southern and northern sides of the range, the basement is capped by Permian sediments, mainly carbonates. The Borohoro Range is itself separated in two compartments by the small, elongated Hexilagen basin in which Early Jurassic coal series are exposed.

=== Yili Basin ===
The Yili basin lies south of the Borohoro Range and is bordered by sutures and fault zones in the western Chinese Tian Shan belt. During the Late Paleozoic, the northern boundary of the Yili basin was an active continental margin related to the southward subduction of the North Tianshan oceanic basin; this boundary is represented by Late Carboniferous turbidite and ophiolitic melange. The southern and northern boundaries have been both reworked by Permian strike-slip faults.

=== Issyk-Kul and Fergana Basins ===
The general strike of the Tian Shan ranges is East-Northeast, but there are significant deviations, especially near the major Talas-Fergana fault. A striking feature of western Tian Shan is the large number of basins containing Cenozoic rocks, prominent basins include the Fergana Basin in the southwest, the Issyk-Kul Basin in the east and Naryn Basin in the south. On the edges of the Tian Shan, there are foreland basins with Cenozoic sediments several kilometers thick. The Talas-Fergana fault is an active strike slip fault in which Quaternary offset is about 10 km and the total offset since the Paleozoic is about 200 km.
