= Kolsay Lakes National Park =

National park in Kazakhstan

Kolsai Lakes National Park
- Көлса́й көлдері́ (ұлттық парк)
- IUCN category II (national park)
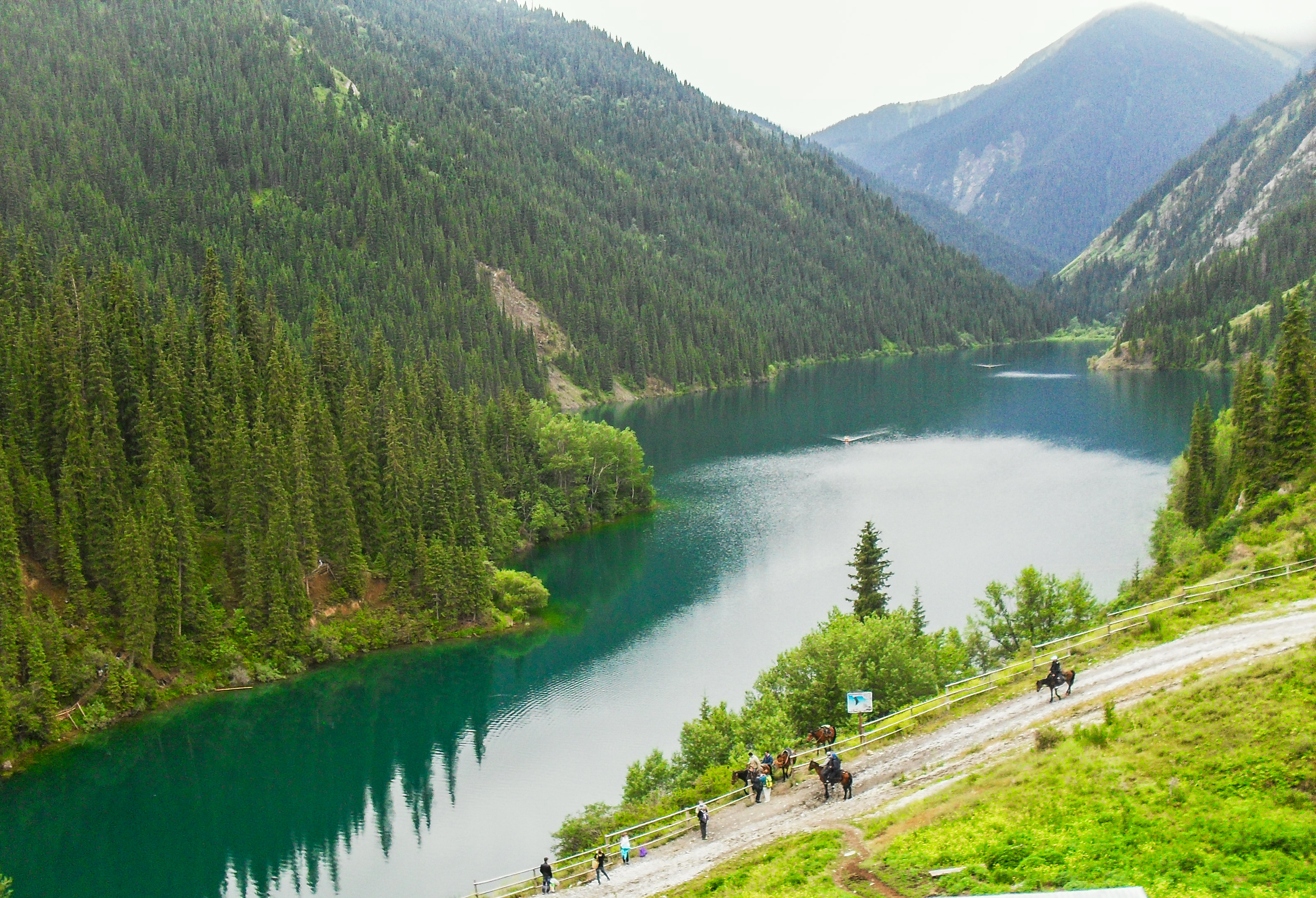
- The Lower Kolsay Lake

- Location within Kazakhstan
- Location: Almaty Region
- Nearest city: Almaty
- Coordinates: 42°56′N 78°24′E
- Area: 161,945 hectares (400,175 acres; 1,619 km^{2}; 625 sq mi)
- Established: 2007
- Governing body: Committee of Forestry and Fauna of the Ministry of Agriculture, Kazakhstan
- Website: kolsai.kz

Kolsay Lakes National Park (Kazakh: Көлсай көлдері ұлттық паркі, Kölsai kölderı ūlttyq parkı) is located on the north slope of the Tian Shan Mountains, southeast Kazakhstan (10 km from the border with Kyrgyzstan). Often referred to as "Pearls of Tien Shan", the park's main feature are the Kolsay Lakes located between the Raiymbek District and Talgar District of Almaty Region. The scenic Lake Kaindy is also within the park. The park boundary is 120 kilometres (75 mi) southeast of Almaty. Lakes of landslide-tectonic origin, approximately formed in 1887 and 1911 on the Kaindy and Kolsay rivers.

== Conservation ==
Nature conservation is an important part of the park's mission, with 72% of the territory under strict protection, and 13% set aside for tourism and recreation. UNESCO includes the park to the World Network of Biosphere Reserves.

== Topography ==
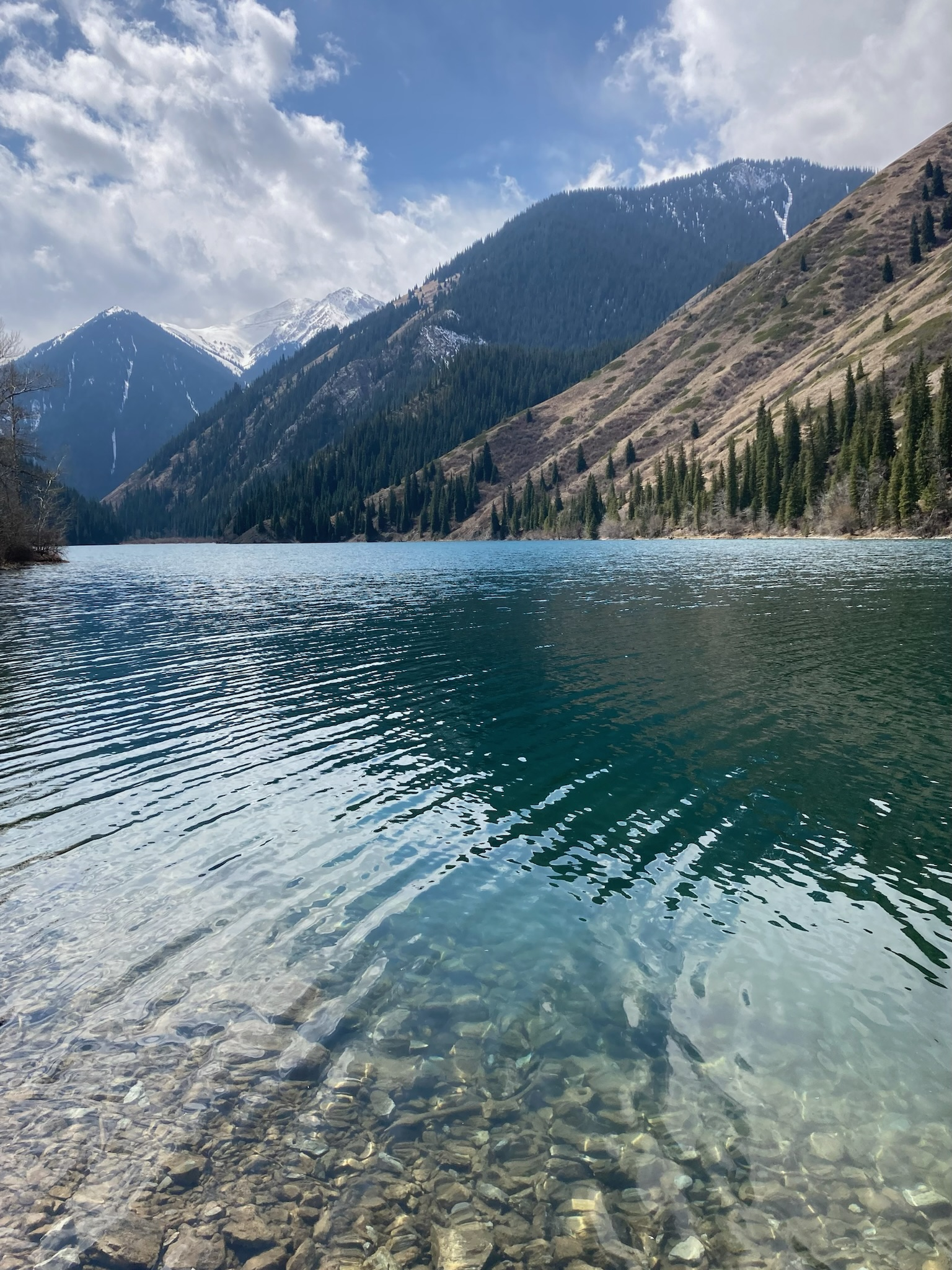
Lower Kolsay Lake

The park's lakes are strung along the Kolsay River, which flows south-to-north out of the Tian Shan. Two ranges of the Tian Shan contribute: the Küngöy Ala-Too Range and the Trans-Ili Alatau. The major lakes include:

- Lower Kolsay Lake. A natural mountain reservoir formed by landslides that block the Kolsay River. The lower lake is about 1 km long, 400 meters wide, and 80 meters in depth. It is accessible by road and has guest-houses and campsites. (altitude: 1,818 meters).

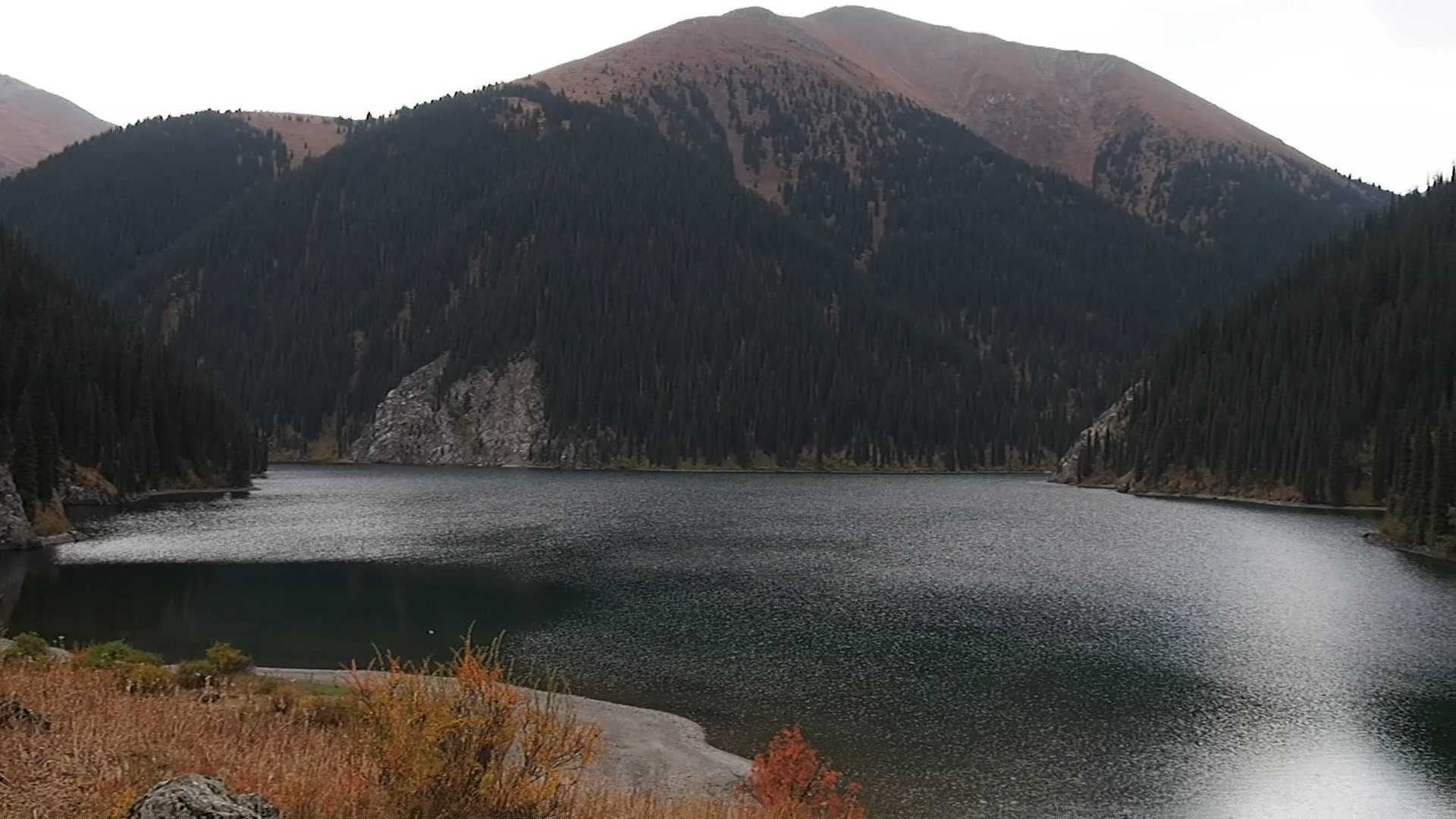
Middle Kolsay Lake

- Middle Kolsay Lake (Mynzholky - meaning "1000 years old"). Five kilometers upstream from the lower lake, the middle lake is the largest of the three, and reaches a depth of 50 meters. (altitude: 2,252 meters). It is considered the most scenic of the three Kolsay Lakes.

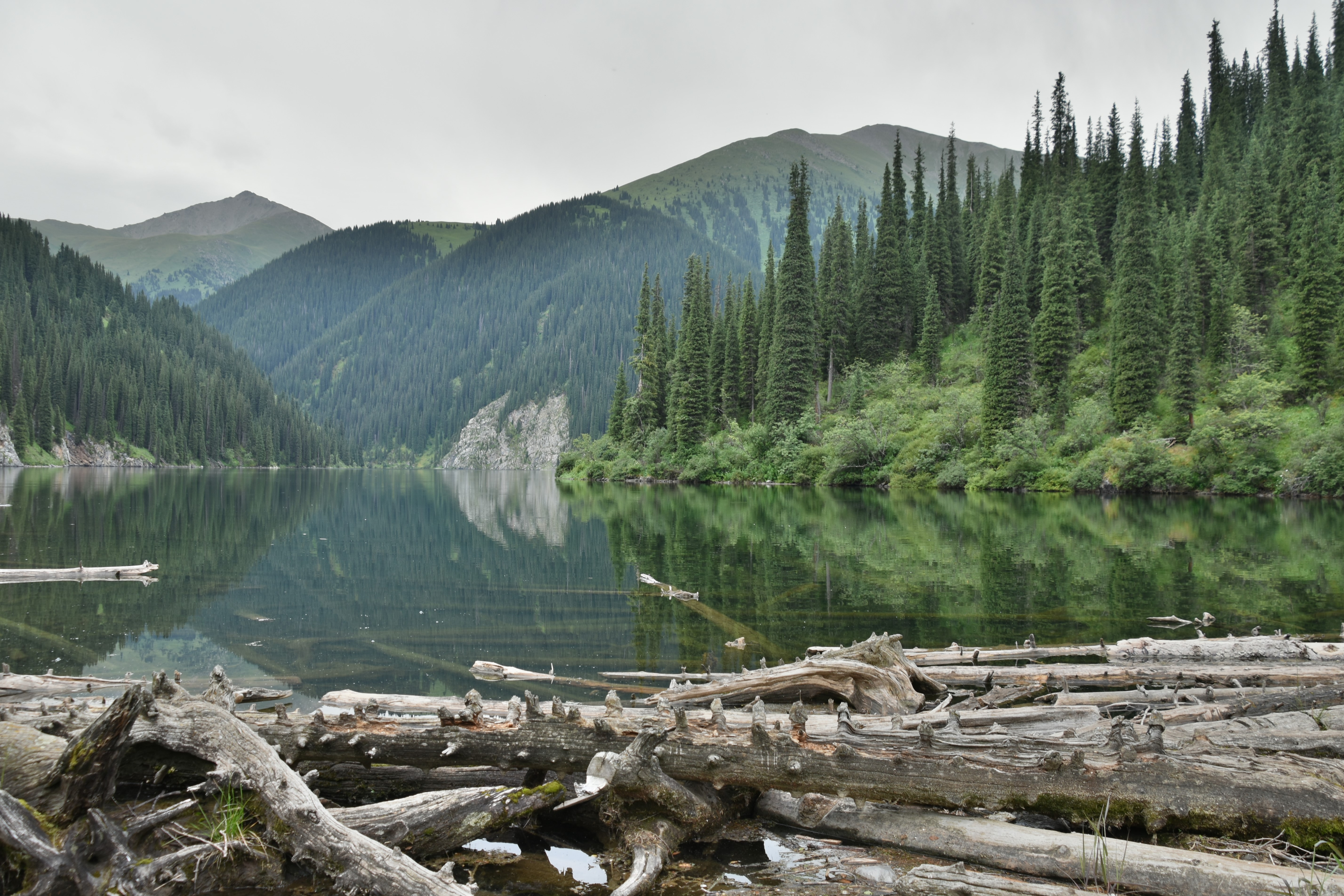
Photo of Middle Kolsay Lake

- Upper Kolsay Lake. Six kilometers above the middle lake, the upper lake is surrounded by spruce trees and alpine meadows. It is 6 km from the Sara-Buluk pass and Kyrgyzstan. (altitude: 2,850 meters).

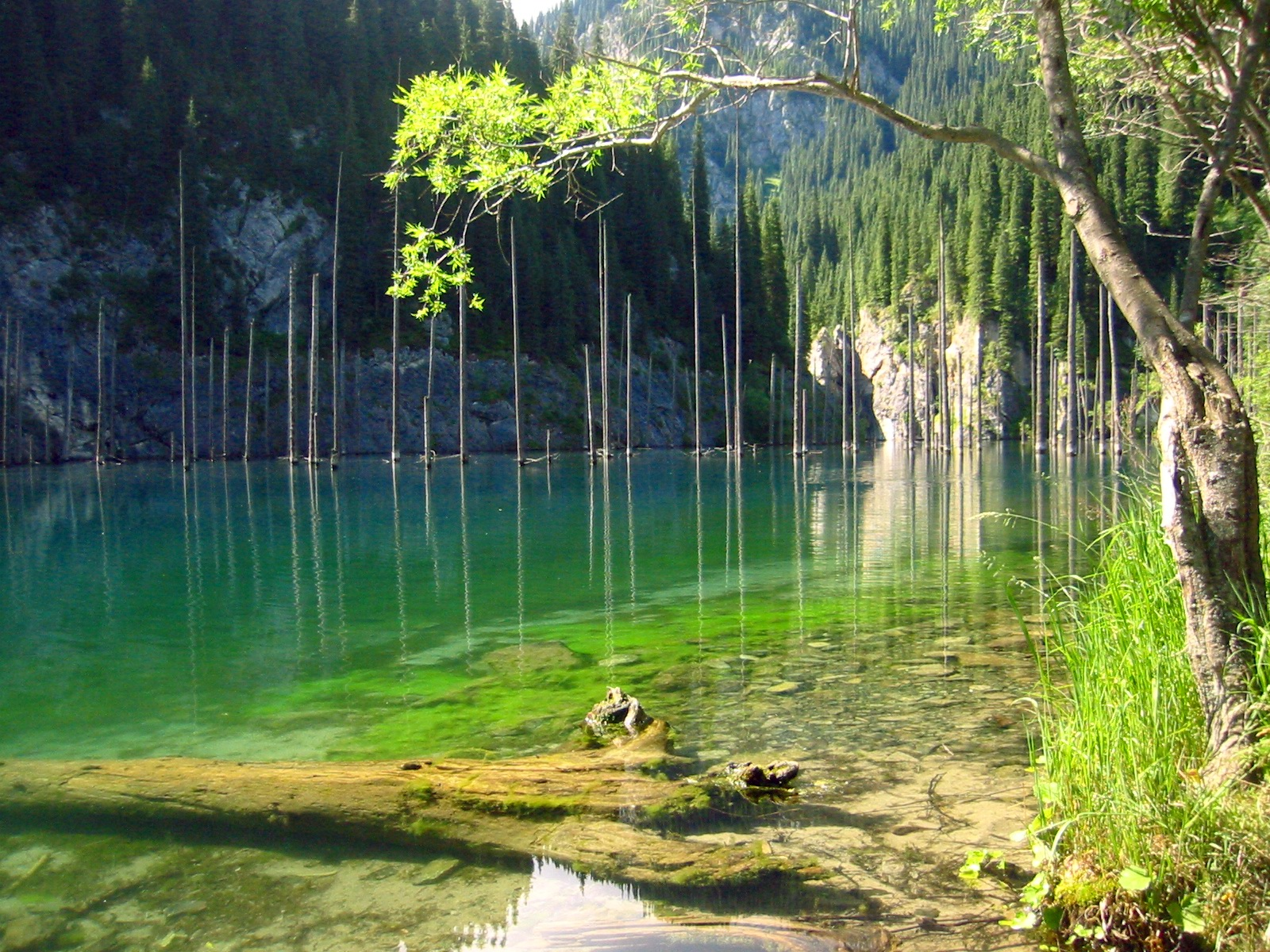
Lake Kaindy in Kolsay Lakes Park. Note the dead spruce trunks rising from lake.

- Lake Kaindy. Located 11 km east of the Kolsay Lakes, Kaindy Lake is located by the Chilik River. The lake is known for its mirror-smooth reflection and stands of dead spruce trunks rising from the water. It was formed in 1911 (when an earthquake caused a landslide that blocked one end of the gorge).

== Ecoregion ==
The protected area of the Kolsay lakes became open to everyone who wants to visit it only a few years ago, so here the nature is preserved in its pristine state. The park is located the Tian Shan montane steppe and meadows ecoregion (WWF #1019), which covers the middle and upper altitudes of the Tian Shan mountains of Central Asia. The area experiences enough rain to support meadows and forests. Also, because of its isolation, it nurtures many rare plants and animal species.

== Climate ==
The climate in the Kolsay Lakes region has been described as a "Humid continental climate, cool summer subtype" (Koeppen Classification Dfb). The region's climate is characterized by large swings in temperature, both diurnally and seasonally, with mild summers and cold winters. In July, temperatures can range from 30 °C (86 °F) during the day, to −5 °C (23 °F) at night.

== Plants and animals ==
The area is ecologically clean and rich in wild plants, many of which are medicinal. Rare local plants include: apricot, ili barberry, hawthorn, and Alberta iris. In the entire area of the Kolsay lakes, in coniferous forests after heavy rains, various mushrooms appear. Scientists have recorded 704 species of plants in the park (12 of which are classified as rare). For animals, the park has recorded 50 species of mammals, 197 species of birds, 2 species of reptiles, 2 species of amphibian (green toad and süyirtumsıq frog), and 2 species of fish (rainbow trout and Tibetan bare kökbas). Six mammals found in the park are classified as rare in Kazakhstan, including the Tian Shen brown bear (U. a. isabellinus), Central Asian river kamşatı, Turkestan lynx, Snow leopard, Tien Shan argali, and the stone marten.

== Tourism ==
There are guest-houses and campsites in the nearby village of Saty. There is a 25 km hiking route that begins at the lower lake, progresses by the Kolsay lakes, and moves over the Sary-Bulak pass (3,278 m). The route takes three days by foot, or one day by horse. Kolsay Lakes are a popular mountain tourism destination in the region. Hiking trails to Kolsay Lakes are relatively accessible for beginners. Popular activities in the area include picnics, horse riding, and mountain biking. April to late September are standard periods for camping in the area.
