= Ketpen =

Ketpen Кетпен
- Village
- Location in Kazakhstan
- Coordinates: 43°27′01″N 80°21′00″E
- Country: Kazakhstan
- Region: Almaty Region
- District: Uygur District

Population (2009)
  - Total: 2,689
- Time zone: UTC+6 (Omsk Time)

Ketpen (Kazakh: Кетпен, Ketpen) is a village in Almaty Region, in south-eastern Kazakhstan.
