= Ketmen Ridge =

Mountain range in the Tian Shan system

Highest point
- Peak: Mount Aspan
- Elevation: 3,652 m (11,982 ft)

Geography
- Country: Kazakhstan
- Region: Almaty
- Districts: Uygur and Raiymbek

The Ketmen Ridge is a mountain range located in southern Kazakhstan, close to the borders of China and Kyrgyzstan. The ridge is within the territory of the China and Raiymbek districts of the Almaty region. It is located to the east of the Zailiisky Alatau, in the northern Tien Shan mountain range. The total length of the ridge is 310 km (190 mi) and its width is up to 50 km (31 mi). The Ketmen Ridge runs from the Kyungei-Ala-Too Ridge in the west to the Narat Ridge in the east and its northern slopes pass into the Ili Valley. It forms the southern border of the ‘Semirechiya’ (‘Seven Rivers’) region, which surrounds Almaty. The altitude ranges from 3,000 to 3,600 m, with the highest point being Mount Aspan at 3,652 m (11,982 ft).

The ridge is composed of igneous and sedimentary rocks such as granite and limestone. The slopes are steep with gentle peaks below the snow line. The ridge has a permafrost zone but does not have glaciation or snowfields. It contains steppe and taiga forests which consist mainly of spruce trees and meadows in high-altitude zones. At the foot of the southern slope of the ridge, steppe bison remains have been found.

The eponymous Ketmen Pass is located at an altitude of 3,040 m (9,970 ft) above sea level in the eastern part of the mountain range. A caravan trail from the Ili Valley to the Kegen-Tekes Hollow runs through the pass, which connects the northern slope in the Ketmen Gorge and southern slope of the ridge of the Shalkudysu river valley.

== Flora and Fauna ==
The Ketmen Ridge includes 1,890 species of mountainous flora. The vegetation in this area consists primarily of vascular plants such as angiosperms, dicots, and monocots. Eighty-four species from 11 genera of rust fungi were found. The most abundant genera found were 48 species of Puccinia, and 12 species of Uromyces.
