= Küngöy Ala-Too Range =

Mountain range in Kyrgyzstan

Küngöy Ala-Too
- Күнгей Алатау (Kazakh)
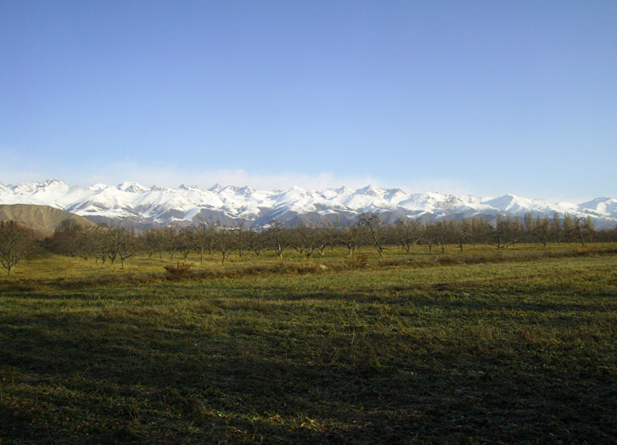
- Küñgoi Ala-Too near Bostery village

Highest point
- Peak: Chok-Tal Peak
- Elevation: 4,771 m (15,653 ft)
- Coordinates: 42.7762°N 76.6900°E

Dimensions
- Length: 280 km (170 mi) E-W
- Width: 32 km (20 mi) N-S

Naming
- Etymology: in Kyrgyz and Kazakh meaning "adret mottled mountains"
- Native name: Күңгөй Ала-Тоо (Kyrgyz)

Geography
- Location within Kyrgyzstan
- Countries: Kyrgyzstan and Kazakhstan
- Province: Issyk Kul and Almaty

The Küngöy Ala-Too (Kyrgyz: Күңгөй Ала-Тоо, romanized: Küñgoi Ala-Too) or the Kungey Alatau (Kazakh: Күнгей Алатау, romanized: Küngei Alatau) is a mountain range, which forms the northern Tien Shan with Zailiyskiy Alatau.

== Description ==
The ridge runs east–west and has a length of 275 km (171 mi) in a straight line. It borders the basin in which Lake Issyk-Kul is located from the north (the same basin bounded by the Terskey Ala-Too ridge from the south). The width of the ridge in the highest part is about 30 km (19 mi). The Zailiysky Alatau stretches parallel to the ridge from the north. The Kungey Alatau and Zailiysky Alatau are separated in the west by the valley of the Chon-Kemin, the main tributary of the Chu River, and in the east by the valley of the Chilik, a tributary of the Ili River. The Chilik-Kemin Bridge connecting the two ridges separates the Chon-Kemin and Chilik valleys. The border of Kazakhstan and Kyrgyzstan, which runs along the Zailiysky Alatau ridge in the west, passes over the Chiliko-Kemin Bridge to the Kungey Alatau ridge. Thus, the ridge to the west of the bridge is located in Kyrgyzstan, and to the east of the bridge it passes the border of Kyrgyzstan and Kazakhstan.

The range begins in the west in the area of the Boom Gorge of the Chu River, where it adjoins the Kyrgyz Ala-Too. The Kungey Alatau in the easterly direction sharply gains height and in the area of the upper reaches of the Dure river reaches a height of 4,000 m (13,000 ft). Here begins the highest central part of the ridge. The highest point is Choktal - 4,771 m (15,653 ft), to the east of which is the Boztyri peak (4,323 m (14,183 ft)). Here the Kumbel ridge leads off in a southeasterly direction. The largest river of the southern slope of the Kungey Alatau, Chon-Ak-Suu, which flows into Issyk-Kul, begins at this point and flows in an easterly direction, so that the northern slope of its valley is the main ridge of the Kungey Alatau, and the southern ridge of the Kumbel. Then the Chon-Ak-Suu valley turns to the south and enters the Semyonovsky gorge. From the Keminsky peak massif (4,643 m (15,233 ft)), the Chiliko-Kemin Bridge runs to the north-west. East of Tchaikovsky peak (4,687 m (15,377 ft)), the ridge descends and passes into the syrty.

The climate of the Northern Tien Shan is continental. The coldest month is January, and the warmest is July. At low altitudes, there is a forest (mainly Tien Shan spruce), and then from 2,800 to 3,600 meters (9,200 to 11,800 ft) there is a subalpine zone, even higher — glaciers. Here there are four of the most famous and visited lakes of the Almaty Region: three Kolsay lakes and Lake Kaindy in the gorges of the Kolsay and the Kaindy.

The Kungey ridge is interesting in mountaineering terms, as a little "conquered" ridge. Of the 150 peaks of the range, only 40 were conquered. Climbers have never visited the 75 km (47 mi) section from the Zharbulak river valley to the Talda valley.
