= Chunja hot springs =

Thermal springs in Kazakhstan

- Chundzha hot springs Shonzy hot springs Charyn-Chundzha hot springs Chungge hot springs
- Location within Kazakhstan Location within Dzungaria
- Location: Chundzha Uygur District, Almaty Region, Republic of Kazakhstan
- Coordinates: 43°38′12.6″N 80°03′17.7″E
- Type: geothermal

Chunja hot springs (also known as Chunzha, Shonzy, Chundzha hot springs, Chungge, or Charyn-Chundzha hot springs) is a system of 140 thermal springs located at Uygur District, Almaty Region, Republic of Kazakhstan.

The Chundzha (also spelled Chunja) is a village in Kazakhstan, the administrative center of the Uygur district of Almaty region. The distance to the regional center Taldıqorğan city is 346 km, to the Almaty city - 243 km. There are a natural monument of national significance- a relic grove of Sogdian ash and hot radon springs near Chunja village. N. Starikov founded the village as a Cossack settlement in 1867. The village intended to protect the caravan routes from Kuldja to the Almaty city (the old name Vernyy). Ashim Arziev is the name of the Central Street of the city. Village Chunja has a population of 17,263 according to the 2019 census.

The water is high in radon; according to folklore, bathing in radioactive water can give some people a sense of healing similar to non-steroidal anti-inflammatory drugs.

== Thermal springs ==
The thermal mineral springs of the Karadalinskiy deposit are located 50 kilometers to the East from the Chunja village. Water in sources are with a high content of radon and silicic acid, calcium, and sodium. The spring water emerges from 140 spring sources at 37° to 50°C / 95° to 122°F.

Water from thermal springs is using for the treatment of various diseases, including diseases of the gastrointestinal tract and respiratory tract.

== Sources ==
- Город Верный и Семиреченская область / А. Лухтанов. — Алматы, 2014. — С. 352. — ISBN 978-601-06-3100-7.
- Chunja (Russian: Чунджа)
