= Aqtam =

Aqtam Ақтам
- Village
- Location in Kazakhstan Aqtam (Asia)
- Coordinates: 43°26′35″N 79°49′09″E
- Country: Kazakhstan
- Region: Almaty Region
- District: Uygur District

Population (2009)
  - Total: 1,846
- Time zone: UTC+6 (Omsk Time)
- Postal code: 041803
- Area code: 72778

Aqtam (Kazakh: Ақтам, Aqtam) is a village in the Almaty Region of south-eastern Kazakhstan.
