= Tomort =

Mountain in Xinjiang, China

- Location within China

Highest point
- Elevation: 4,886 m (16,030 ft)
- Prominence: 3,243 m (10,640 ft); Ranked 70th
- Listing: Ultra
- Coordinates: 43°04′24″N 94°20′48″E

Geography
- Location: Xinjiang, China
- Parent range: Karlik Mountains, Tien Shan

Climbing
- First ascent: August 15, 2005, by Hiroyuki Katsuki and Koichiro Takahashi

Tomort, or Tomurty (simplified Chinese: 托木尔提峰; traditional Chinese: 托木爾提峰; pinyin: Tuōmù'ěrtí Fēng), is the highest peak in the Karlik Mountains, a far eastern subrange of the Tien Shan mountain range in Xinjiang, China. While not of great absolute elevation among Chinese peaks, it is well-separated from higher terrain, and hence is ranked 70th by topographic prominence.

Tomort was reconnoitered or attempted in 1996, 1997, 2000, and 2004, by Chinese and Japanese parties. Its first, and to date only, ascent was in 2005, by a small group from the Alpine Club of the National Defense Academy of Japan, led by Isao Fukura. They described the summit as a "table-top ice-snow plateau, with glaciers several kilometers long descending on all sides," which was reached by "a crevassed glacier and a 50 degree snow/ice face."

== See also ==
- List of ultras of Central Asia
