= Qarliq Tagh =

Mountain in People's Republic of China

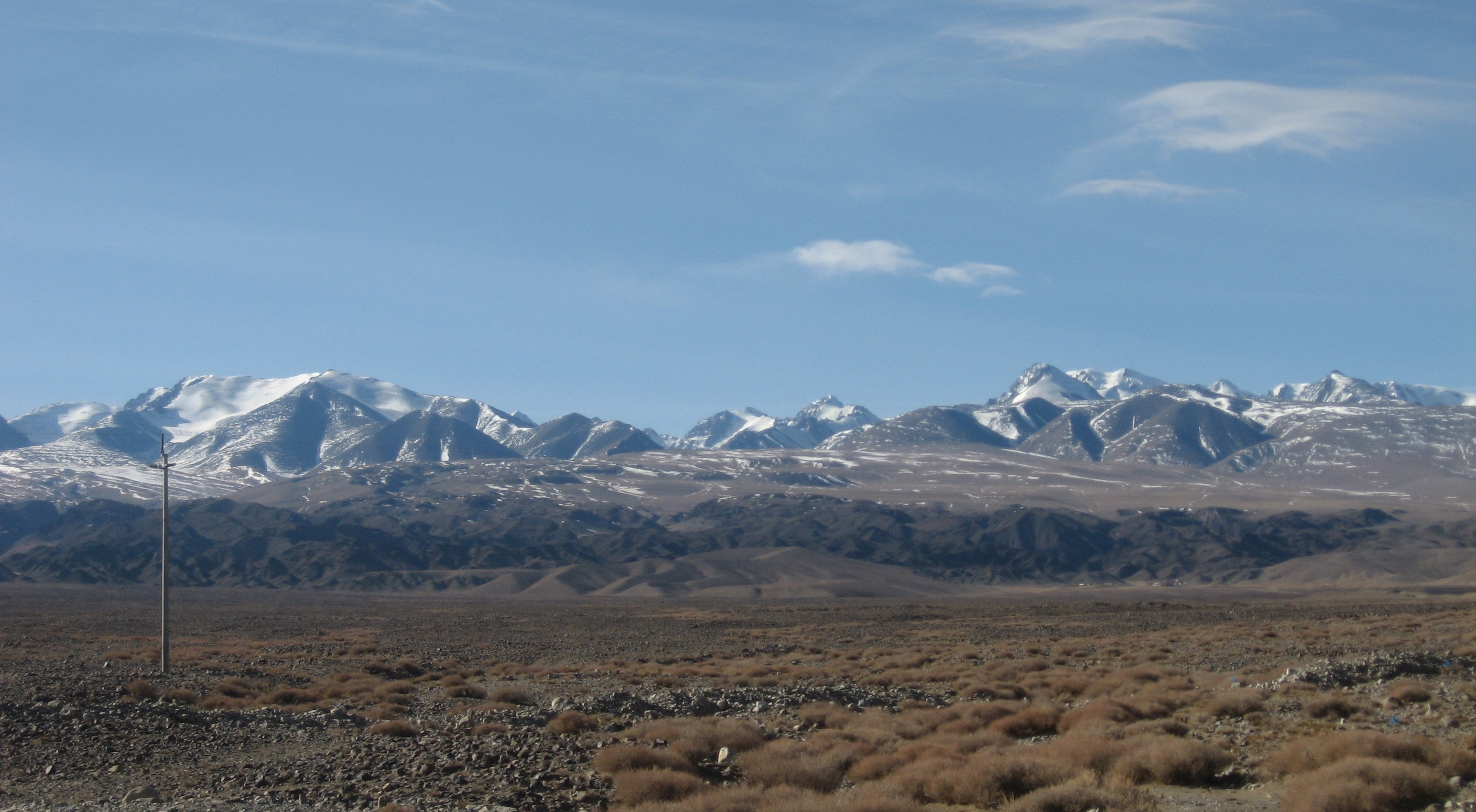
- North side of Karlik Shan

Highest point
- Peak: Tomort
- Elevation: 4,886 m (16,030 ft)

Dimensions
- Length: 200 km (120 mi)

Geography
- Location within China
- Country: China
- Region: Xinjiang
- Range coordinates: 43°06′06″N 94°17′58″E
- Parent range: Tian Shan

Qarliq Tagh (also Harlik Shan, Karlik Tagh, or Qarlik Shan) is the easternmost mountain range of the Tian Shan, China. It is located in Xinjiang, China, between 42º50'N–43º35'N and 93º41'E–95º07'E. In its western end it connects with the Barkol Shan. The highest peak is the Tomort (4,886 m above sea level).

The mountain range is characterized by distinct ice caps and more than 122 glaciers with a total area of 126 km^{2}, of which are 73 on the southern and 49 on the northern flanks.

In the north, the mountains descend steeply into the Naomaohu basin, which connects to the Naomaohu Gobi (chin.) / Nomingyyn Gobi (mongol.). In the south, the mountain range descends into the Hami basin, with elevations as low as 50 m below sea level.
