= Barkol Tagh =

Mountain range in China

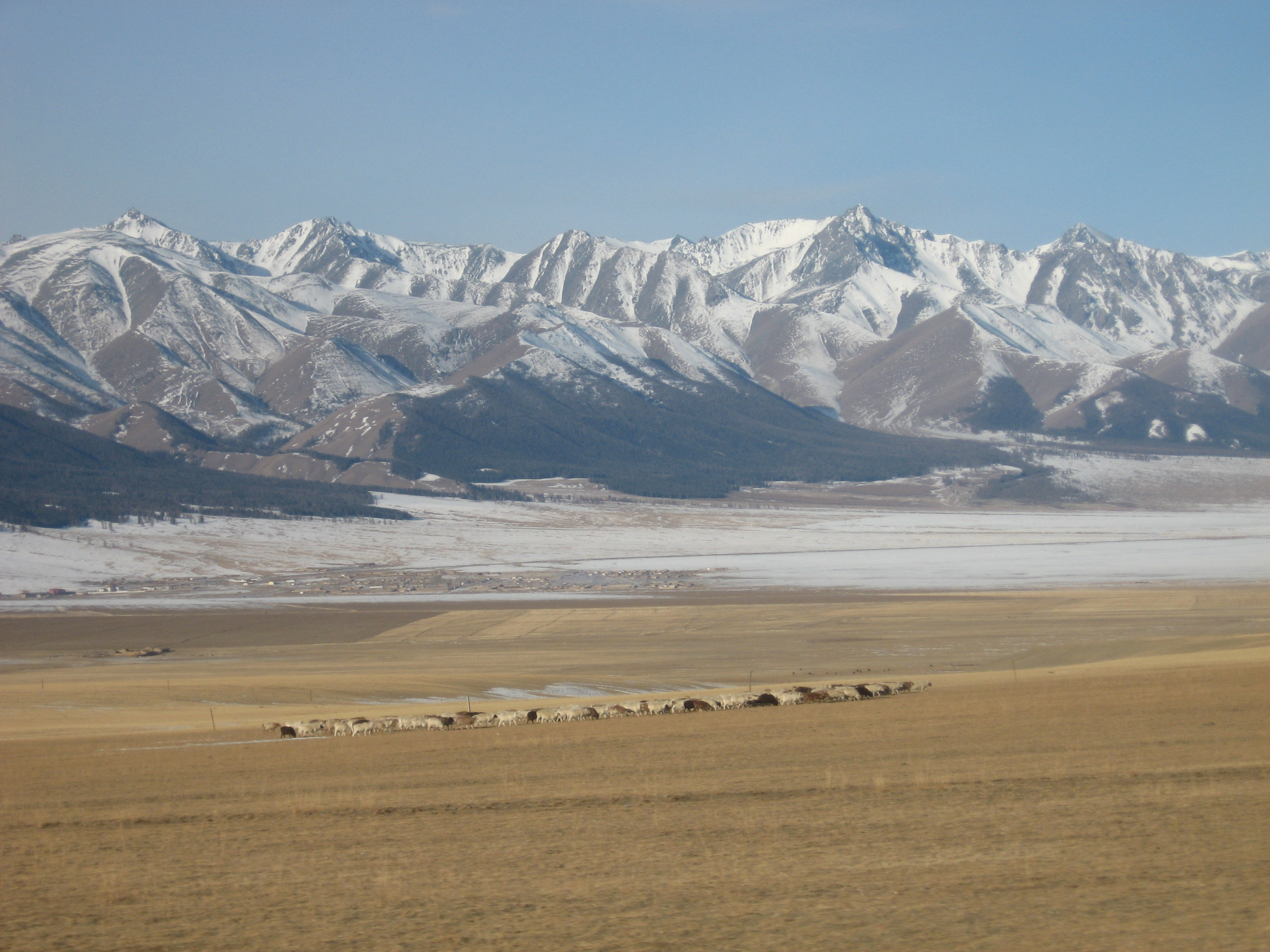
- Northeastern flank of the Barkol range

Geography
- Location within Xinjiang
- State(s): Xinjiang; China
- Range coordinates: 43°24′44″N 93°18′58″E
- Parent range: Tian Shan

The Barkol Tagh, also known as Barkol Shan (Chinese: 巴里坤山), forms together with the Qarlik Tagh the easternmost end of the Tian Shan mountain range. It is located along an active thrust fault in the Kumul prefecture in Xinjiang province.

Barkol city and the hypersaline Lake Balikun (116 km^{2}) are located at the northern flank of the mountain range. There, mean annual temperature is 1.0°C and mean annual precipitation is 210 mm.

Another branch of the Tian Shan, the Meiqinwula Mountains, is located north of the Lake Balikun basin.

== See also ==
- List of ultras of Central Asia
