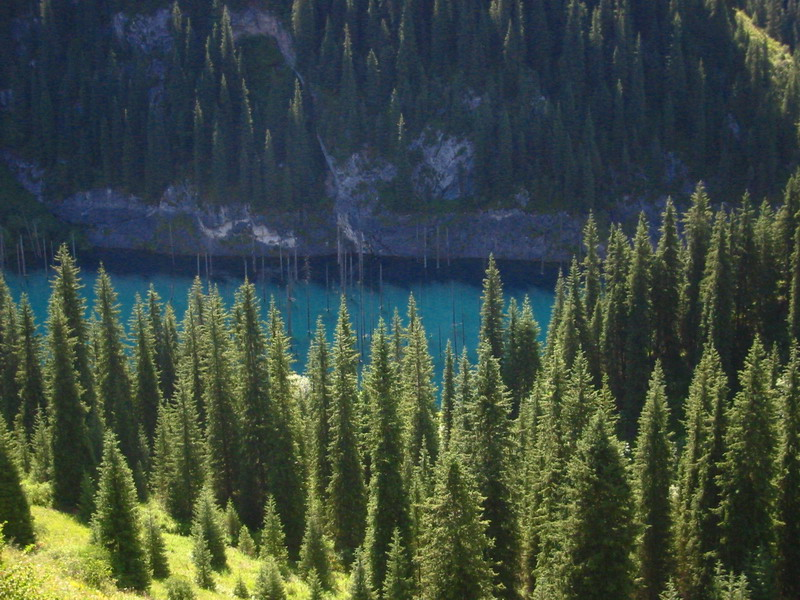
- Forest at Lake Kaindy, southeast Kazakhstan

Conservation status
- Least Concern (IUCN 3.1)

Scientific classification
- Kingdom: Plantae
- Clade: Tracheophytes
- Clade: Gymnospermae
- Division: Pinophyta
- Class: Pinopsida
- Order: Pinales
- Family: Pinaceae
- Genus: Picea
- Species: P. schrenkiana

Binomial name
- Picea schrenkiana Fisch. & C.A.Mey.

Synonyms
- Abies schrenkiana (Fisch. & C.A.Mey.) Lindl. & Gordon; Pinus schrenkiana (Fisch. & C.A.Mey.) Antoine

= Picea schrenkiana =

Species of conifer

Picea schrenkiana, Schrenk's spruce, or Asian spruce, is a spruce native to the Tian Shan mountains of Central Asia (in Kazakhstan and Kyrgyzstan) and also to western China (Xinjiang). It grows at elevations of 1,200–3,500 m (3,900–11,500 ft), usually in pure forests, sometimes mixed with the Tien Shan variety of Siberian fir (Abies sibirica var. semenovii). Its name was given in honour of Alexander von Schrenk (1816–1876).

== Description ==
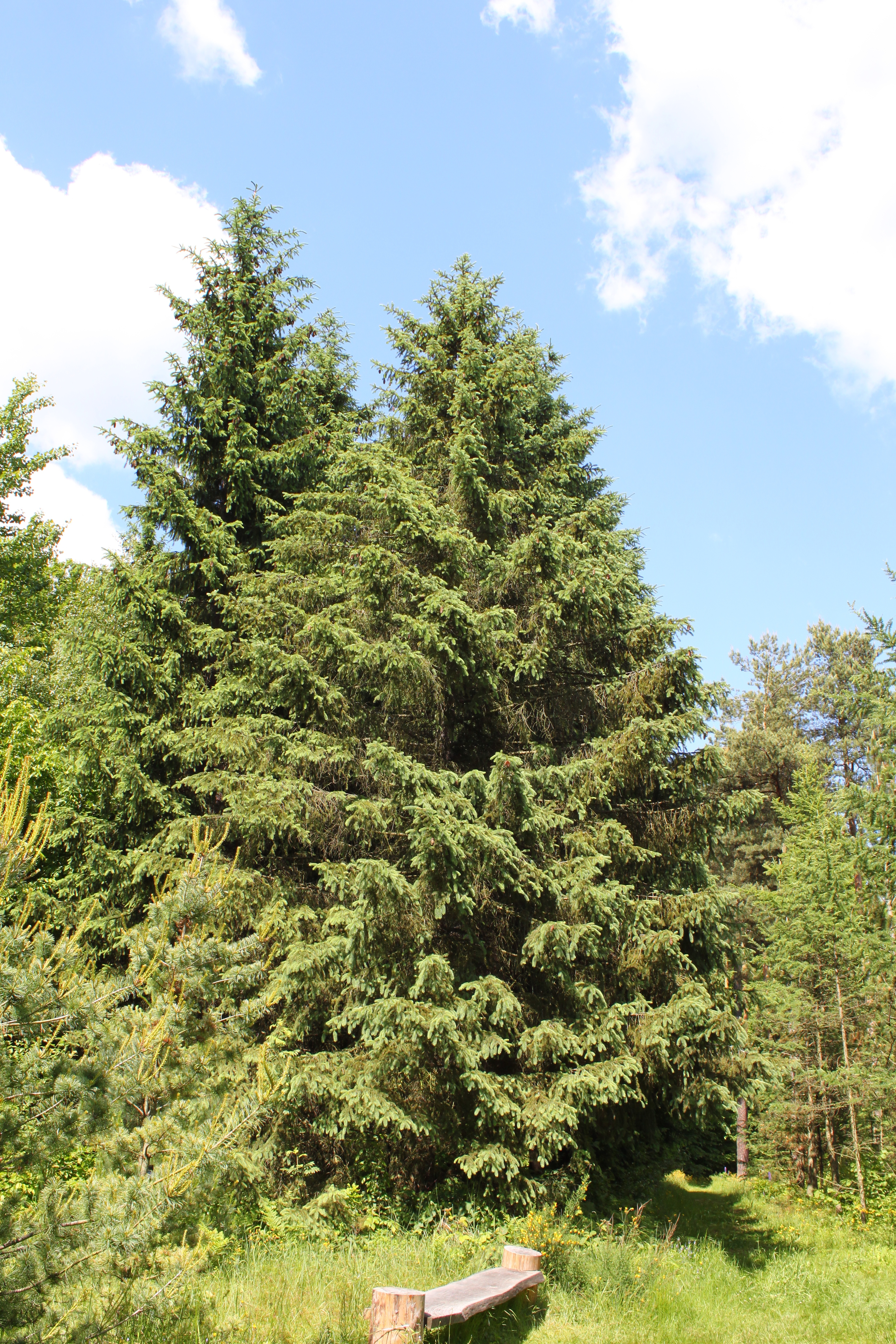
In Rogów Arboretum, Poland

Picea schrenkiana is a large evergreen tree growing to 40–50 metres (130–160 ft) tall (rarely to 60 m (200 ft)), with a trunk diameter of up to 1–2 m (3–7 ft). It has a narrow conical crown with level branches and sometimes pendulous branchlets. The shoots are pale buff-brown, and glabrous (hairless). The leaves are needle-like, 1.5–3.5 cm (0.6–1.4 in) long, rhombic in cross-section, dark green with inconspicuous stomatal lines.

The cones are cylindrical–conic, 6–12 cm (2.4–4.7 in)long and 2 cm (0.8 in) broad, purple when young, maturing dark brown and opening to 2.5–3.5 cm (1.0–1.4 in) broad 5–7 months after pollination; the scales are moderately stiff and smoothly rounded.

=== Subspecies ===
There are two subspecies:

- Picea schrenkiana subsp. schrenkiana. Eastern Tian Shan, in Kazakhstan and Xinjiang. Leaves longer, 2–3.5 cm (0.8–1.4 in) long.
- Picea schrenkiana subsp. tianshanica (Rupr.) Bykov. Western Tian Shan, in Kyrgyzstan. Leaves shorter, 1.5–2.5 cm (0.6–1.0 in) long.

It is closely related to, and in many respects intermediate between the Morinda spruce (Picea smithiana) from further south in the Himalaya, and the Siberian spruce (Picea obovata) further north in Siberia.

== Uses ==
Schrenk's spruce is an important tree in central Asia for timber and paper production, where few other large trees exist. Its slower growth compared to the Norway spruce (Picea abies) reduces its importance outside of its native range.

== Cultivation ==
Picea schrenkiana is grown as an ornamental tree in large gardens and public parks in Europe.
