= Lake Kaindy =

Lake in Almaty Region, Kazakhstan

- Қайыңды көлі (Kazakh)
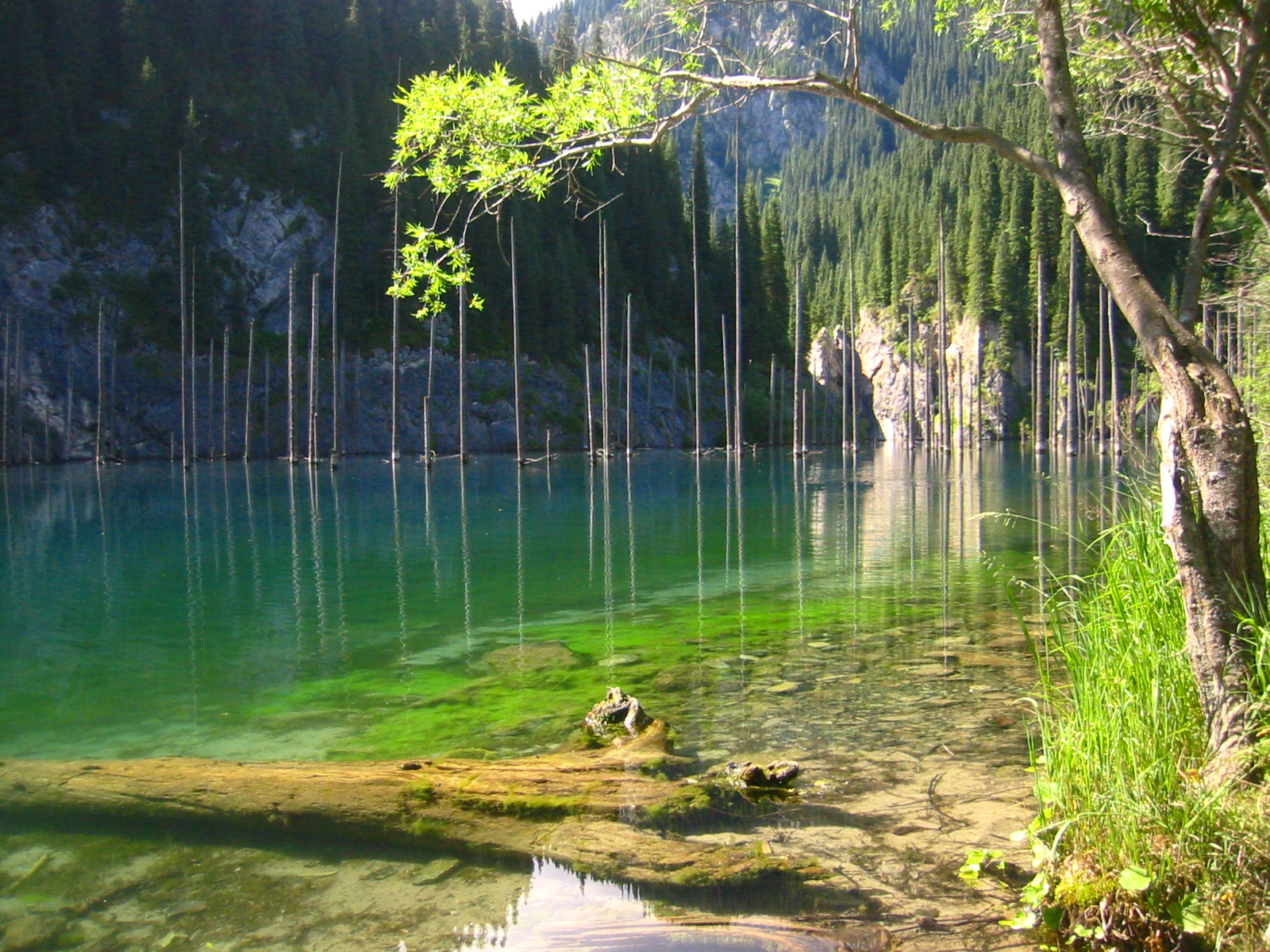

- Location in Kazakhstan
- Coordinates: 42°59′15″N 78°27′50″E
- Basin countries: Kazakhstan
- Max. length: 400 m (1,300 ft)
- Max. depth: 30 m (98 ft)
- Surface elevation: 2,000 m (6,600 ft)

Lake Kaindy (Kazakh: Қайыңды көлі, Qaiyñdy kölı, meaning the "birch tree lake" or landslide) is a 400-meter-long (1,300 ft) lake located in Kazakhstan. The lake reaches depths of nearly 30 meters (98 ft). It is located 129 kilometers (80 mi) east-southeast of the city of Almaty and is 2,000 meters (6,600 ft) above sea level.

== History ==
Lake Kaindy is located in the south of Kazakhstan, within Kolsay Lakes National Park. It is located 2,000 metres (6,600 ft) above sea level, 130 kilometres (81 mi) east of Almaty. The lake was formed as the result of a major limestone landslide triggered by the 1911 Kebin earthquake forming a natural dam. It blocked the gorge and was filled by mountain river water. Lake Kaindy is about 400 meters long, reaching depths of nearly 30 meters at its deepest point. Altered by limestone deposits, the water maintains a bluish-green color.

The lake contains trunks of submerged Picea schrenkiana trees that rise above the surface of the lake. The area is often referred to as a "sunken forest". The cold water helps preserve the tree trunks, which are overgrown with algae and various other water plants. In recent years, Lake Kaindy has become a popular international tourist destination. The lake is also known for ice diving and trout fishing in the winter season.

The Kaindy river flows into the lake, passing through a two-sided rock face about 20 meters high. The upper part of the trees protruding from the water lost their side branches and bark, and the wood turned white. It resembles a submerged squadron with the bare trunks of the trees being the masts of sunken ships. The lake surface changes color and often has blue color, caused by lime and other minerals in the clear water. Despite the low water temperature, Kaindy lake is popular with divers.
