= Borohoro Mountains =

Mountain range in China and Kazakhstan

Coordinates: 44.4343°N 81.5221°E

The Borohoro Mountains (Chinese: 博罗科努山; pinyin: Bóluōkēnǔ shān; Wade–Giles: P'o-lo-k'o-nu shan; Kazakh: Борохоро жотасы, Borohoro jotasy) is one of the major ranges of the Tian Shan mountain system. It is almost entirely located within China's Xinjiang Uyghur Autonomous Region, with only a few westernmost peaks being in Kazakhstan.

The Borohoro Range runs in the general west-north-west to east-south-east direction. At its eastern end, southwest of Ürümqi, it joins the main range of the Tian Shan; at the western end, near the China–Kazakhstan border, it joins the Dzungarian Alatau.

The Borohoro Range separates the Dzungarian Basin in the north from the Ili River Basin in the south. Streams flowing from the northern slope of the Borohoro flow toward the Aibi Lake or the Manas Lake; those rising on the southern slope flow toward the Ili River, which flows into Kazakhstan's Lake Balkhash.

The border between Xinjiang's Ili Kazakh Autonomous Prefecture and Bortala Mongol Autonomous Prefecture runs along the Borohoro Range.

A blind thrust fault under the mountain range was the source of the deadly magnitude 7.9 Manasi earthquake.

== See also ==
- List of ultras of Central Asia
