= Tian Shan =

System of mountain ranges in Central Asia

- Tengir-Too, Tengri Tagh, 天山
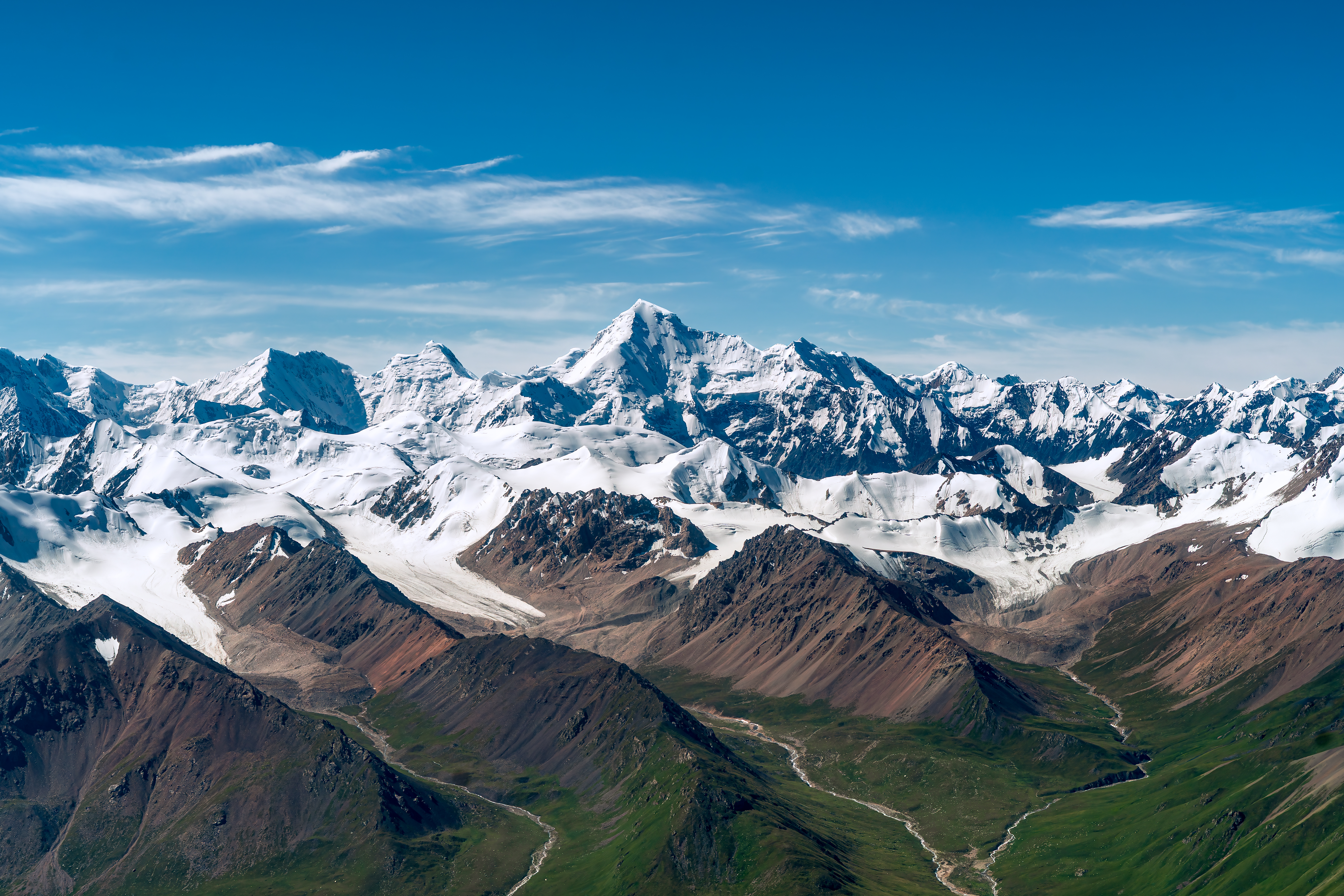
- Snow-covered peaks of central Tian Shan behind alpine meadows, with Nansen Peak (c. 5,697 m (18,691 ft)) in the middle

Highest point
- Peak: Jengish Chokusu
- Elevation: 7,439 m (24,406 ft)
- Coordinates: 42°02′06″N 80°07′32″E

Geography
- Location within Continental Asia Location within China
- Countries: Kyrgyzstan; China; Kazakhstan; Uzbekistan; Tajikistan
- Range coordinates: 42°N 80°E

Geology
- Rock age(s): Mesozoic and Cenozoic

UNESCO World Heritage Site
- Official name: Xinjiang Tianshan
- Type: Natural
- Criteria: vii, ix
- Designated: 2013 (37th session)
- Reference no.: 1414
- Region: Asia

UNESCO World Heritage Site
- Official name: Western Tien-Shan
- Type: Natural
- Criteria: x
- Designated: 2016 (40th session)
- Reference no.: 1490
- Region: Asia

Tian Shan
- Chinese: 天山
- Literal meaning: "Mountains of Heaven"
Transcriptions
Standard Mandarin
- Hanyu Pinyin: Tiānshān
- Wade–Giles: T'ien^{1}-shan^{1}
- IPA: [tʰjɛ́n.ʂán]
Yue: Cantonese
- Yale Romanization: Tīnsāan
- Jyutping: Tin1-saan1
- IPA: [tʰin˥.san˥]
Southern Min
- Hokkien POJ: Thiⁿ-soaⁿ

The Tian Shan, (Note: Chinese: 天山; pinyin: Tiānshān; lit. 'Heaven Mountain'; Kyrgyz: Теңир-Тоо / Ала-Тоо, Tengir-Too / Ala-Too; Dungan: Тянсан, Tiansan; Old Turkic: 𐰴𐰣 𐱅𐰭𐰼𐰃, Tenğri tağ; Turkish: Tanrı Dağı; Mongolian: Тэнгэр уул, Tenger uul; Uyghur: تەڭرىتاغ, Tengri tagh, Тәңри тағ; Kazakh: Тәңіртауы / Алатау, Täñırtauy / Alatau, تٵڭٸرتاۋى / الاتاۋ; تەڭىر-توو / الا-توو; Uzbek: Tyan-Shan / Tangritog‘, Тян-Шан / Тангритоғ, تيەن-شەن / تەڭرىتاغ) also known as the Tengri Tagh or Tengir-Too, is a large system of mountain ranges in Central Asia. The highest peak is Jengish Chokusu at 7,439 metres (24,406 ft) high and located in Kyrgyzstan. Its lowest point is at the Turpan Depression, which is 154 m (505 ft) below sea level.

The Tian Shan is sacred in Tengrism. Its second-highest peak is known as Khan Tengri, which can be translated as "Lord of the Spirits". At the 2013 Conference on World Heritage, the eastern portion of Tian Shan in western China's Xinjiang Region was listed as a World Heritage Site. The western portion in Kyrgyzstan, Kazakhstan, and Uzbekistan was then listed in 2016.

== Name ==
One of the earliest historical references to these mountains may be related to the Xiongnu word Qilian (traditional Chinese: 祁連; simplified Chinese: 祁连; pinyin: Qílián), which, according to Tang commentator Yan Shigu, is the Xiongnu word for "sky" or "heaven". Sima Qian, in the Records of the Grand Historian, mentioned Qilian in relation to the homeland of the Yuezhi, and the term is believed to refer to the Tian Shan instead of the range 1,500 kilometres (930 mi) further east now known as the Qilian Mountains. The name of the Otgontenger in Mongolia has the same meaning.

== Geography ==
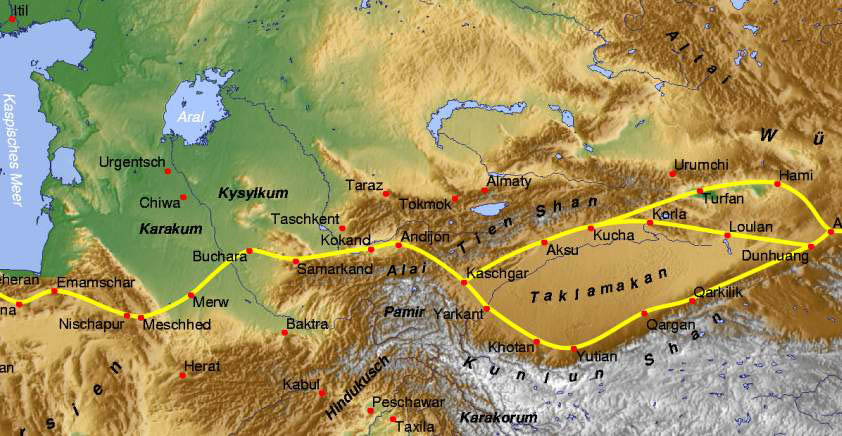
Tian Shan with the ancient Silk Road

The Tian Shan range is located north and west of the Taklamakan Desert and directly north of the Tarim Basin. It straddles the border regions of Kazakhstan, Kyrgyzstan, Uzbekistan and Xinjiang in Northwest China. To the south, it connects with the Pamir Mountains, while to north and east, it meets the Altai Mountains of Mongolia.

The Tian Shan range extends eastwards for approximately 2,900 kilometers from Tashkent, Uzbekistan. It forms part of the Himalayan orogenic belt, resulting from the collision of the Indian and Eurasian tectonic plates during the Cenozoic era. The range encompasses the Bogda Shan in the east, as defined by both Western and Chinese cartography.

The Tian Shan's highest peak is Jengish Chokusu (also known as Victory Peak), shared by Kyrgyzstan and China. At 7,439 metres (24,406 ft) high, it is the highest point in Kyrgyzstan. The Tian Shan's second highest peak, Khan Tengri (King Heaven), straddles the Kazakhstan-Kyrgyzstan-China tripoint and at 7,010 metres (23,000 ft), is the highest point of Kazakhstan. Mountaineers class these as the two northernmost peaks surpassing 7,000 metres (23,000 ft) in the world.

The Torugart Pass, at 3,752 metres (12,310 ft), marks the border between Kyrgyzstan and Xinjiang. The lower-altitude, forested Alatau ranges in the northern Tian Shan is home to Turkic-speaking pastoral tribes.

The Tian Shan is separated from the Tibetan Plateau by the Taklimakan Desert and the Tarim Basin to the south. The Syr Darya, Ili River and Tarim River originate in the Tian Shan. The Aksu Canyon is a prominent feature in the mountain range's northwestern section.

Continuous permafrost typically forms in the Tian Shan at elevations above 3,500-3,700 meters. Discontinuous permafrost can be found as low as 2,000 meters in specific locations influenced by unique topographical and climatic conditions, though it generally occurs between 2,700 and 3,300 meters altitude.

The Tian Shan's glaciers are rapidly receding, losing 27% or 5.4 billion tons of ice since 1961— nearly four times the global average of 7%. By 2050, half of the remaining ice is projected to disappear.

Russian explorer Peter Semenov was one of the first Europeans to extensively document the Tian Shan in the 1850s, ultimately changing his family name to refer to the mountains.

== Ranges ==
The Tian Shan have a number of named ranges which are often mentioned separately (all distances are approximate):

- Barkol Tagh (Barkol Shan)
- Bei Shan
- Bogda Shan
- Borohoro Shan
- Irenchabirga
- Qarliq Tagh (Qarlik Shan, Karkik Tagh, Karlik Shan, Harlik Shan)
- Kyrgyz Ala-Too Range (Kyrgyz Alatau, Kyrgyz Range, Alexander Range)
- Kakshaal Too (Kokschaal Tau, Qaqşaal Too)
- Küngöy Ala-Too Range (Kungej-Alatau, Kungey Alatau, Kungoy Ala-Too, Küngei Alataw. Kungey Alataw)
- Ketmen Ridge
- Kuruk Tagh (Quruq Tagh, Kuruktagh, Kuluketage, Kuruktage Shan)
- Talas Alatau (Talas Alatow, Talas Ala-Too)
- Suusamyr Too
- Terskey Alatoo (Terskey Alatau, Terskej Alatau, Teskey Alatoo)
- Trans-Ili Alatau (Ile Alatau, Ile Alatauy, Zailiisky Alatau, Transili Alatau)

In China the Tian Shan starts from about 600 to 400 kilometres (370 to 250 mi) east of Ürümqi, north of Kumul City (Hami) with the Qarliq Tagh and the Barkol Mountains. Then the Bogda Shan (god mountains) run from 350 to 40 kilometres (217 to 25 mi) east of Ürümqi. Then there is a low area between Ürümqi and the Turfan Depression. The Borohoro Mountains start just south of Ürümqi and run west-northwest 450 kilometres (280 mi) separating Dzungaria from the Ili River basin. Their north end abuts on the 200 kilometres (120 mi) Dzungarian Alatau which runs east northeast along Sino-Kazakh border. They start 50 kilometres (31 mi) east of Taldykorgan in Kazakhstan and end at the Dzungarian Gate. The Dzungarian Alatau in the north, the Borohoro Mountains in the middle and the Ketmen Ridge in the south make a reversed Z or S, the northeast enclosing part of Dzungaria and the southwest enclosing the upper Ili valley.

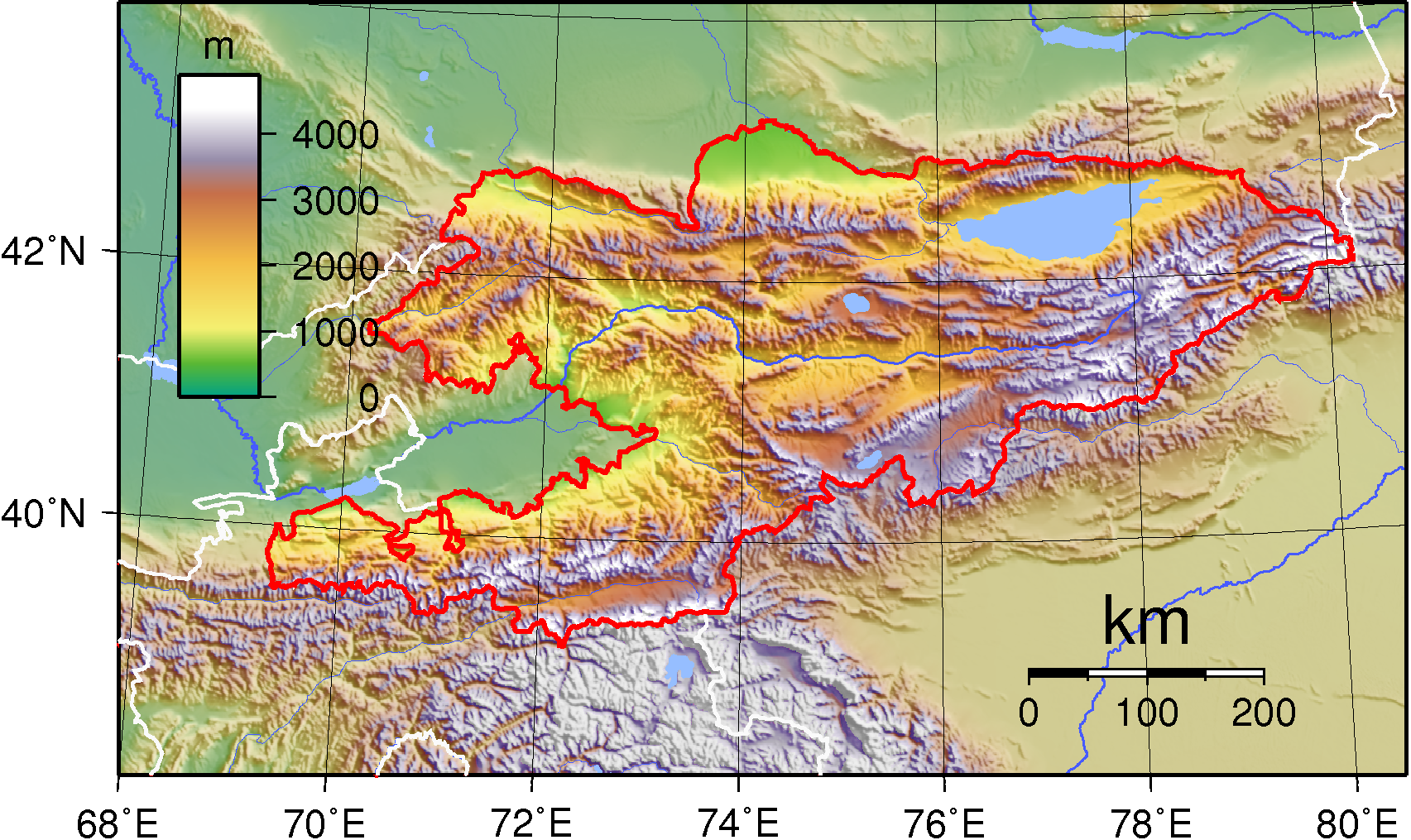
Map of Kyrgyzstan (borders marked in red). The Tian Shan makes up large parts of southern Kyrgyzstan. The indentation on the west is the Fergana Valley

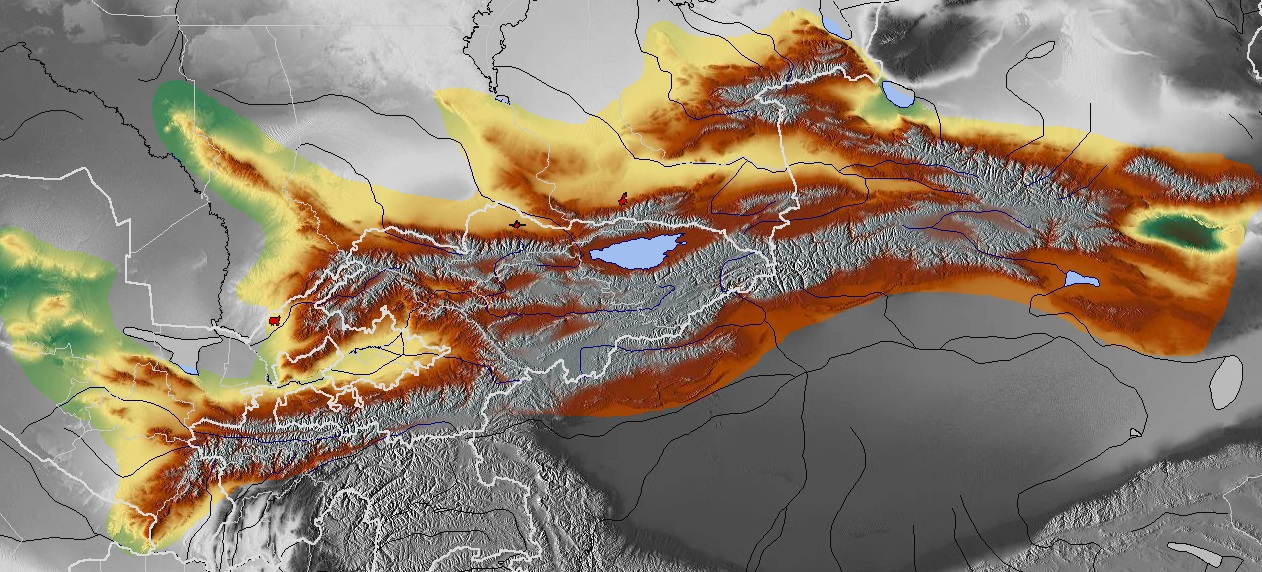
Map of Tian Shan

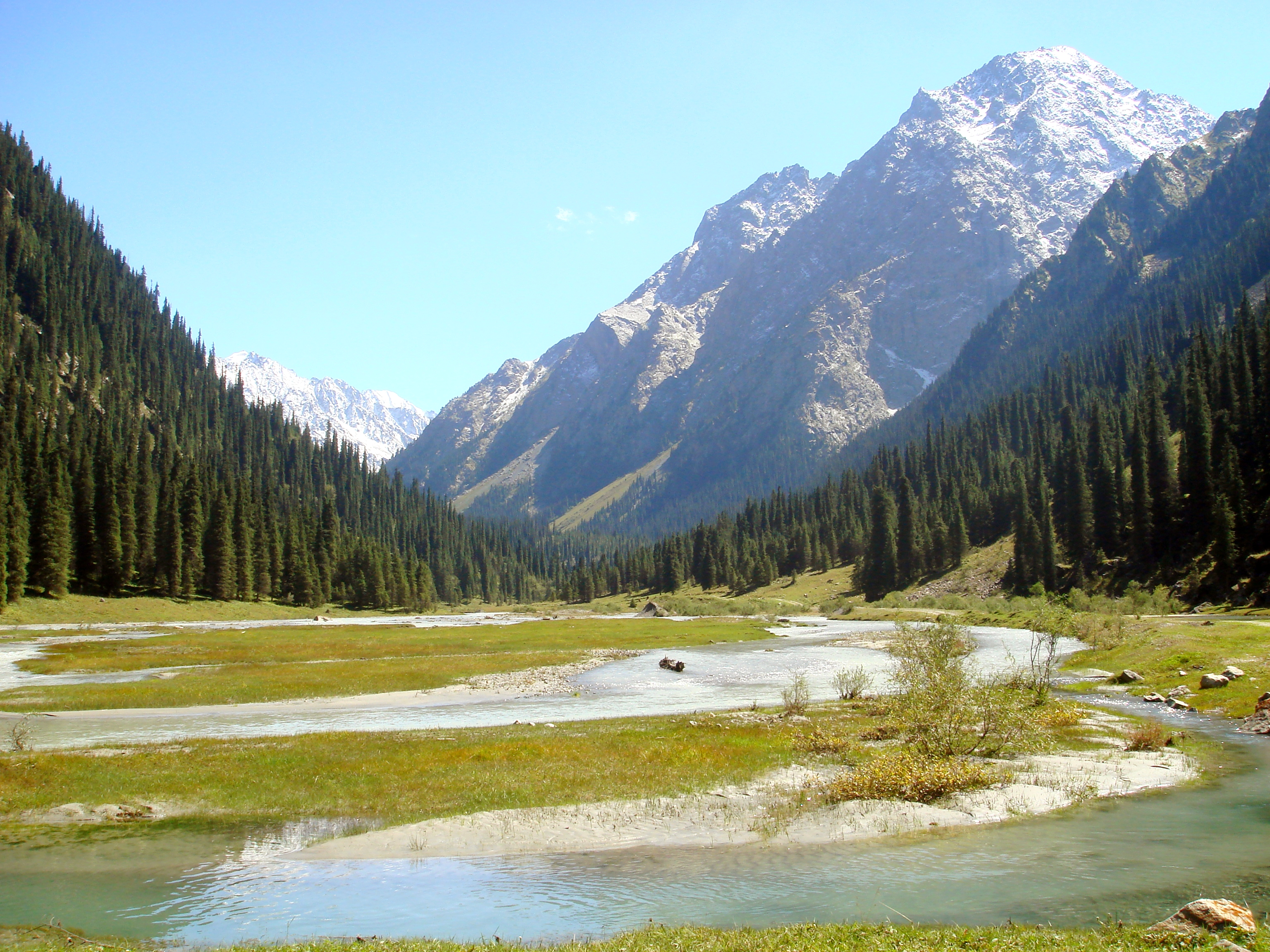
Tian Shan as viewed from the Karakol valley (Issyk-Kul Region, Kyrgyzstan)

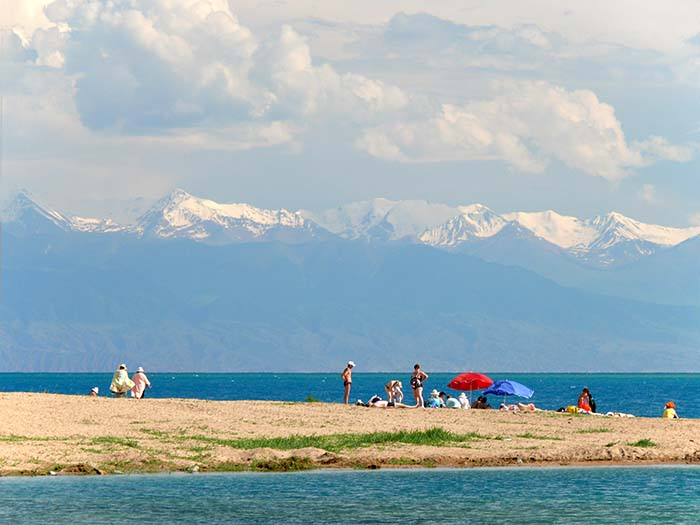
Snow-capped peaks of the Tian Shan seen from an Issyk Kul Lake beach

In Kyrgyzstan the mainline of the Tian Shan continues as Narat Range from the base of the Borohoros west 570 kilometres (350 mi) to the point where China, Kazakhstan, and Kyrgyzstan meet. Here is the highest part of the range – the Central Tian Shan, with Peak Pobeda (Kakshaal Too range) and Khan Tengri. West of this, the Tian Shan split into an 'eye', with Issyk Kul Lake in its center. The south side of the lake is the Terskey Alatau and the north side the Kyungey Ala-Too (shady and sunny Ala-Too). North of the Kyungey Ala-Too and parallel to it is the Trans-Ili Alatau in Kazakhstan just south of Almaty. West of the eye, the range continues 400 kilometres (250 mi) as the Kyrgyz Ala-Too, separating Chüy Region from Naryn Region of Kyrgyzstan and then Kazakhstan from the upper valley of the river Talas, the south side of which is the 200 kilometres (120 mi) Talas Ala-Too Range ('Ala-too' is a Kyrgyz spelling, while ‘Alatau’ is a Kazakh spelling). At the east end of the Talas Alatau the Suusamyr Too range runs southeast enclosing the Suusamyr Valley or plateau.

As for the area south of the Fergana Valley there is an 800 kilometres (500 mi) group of mountains that curves west-southwest from south of Issyk Kul Lake separating the Tarim Basin from the Fergana Valley. The Fergana Range runs northeast towards the Talas Ala-Too and separates the upper Naryn basin from Fergana proper. The southern side of these mountains merge into the Pamirs in Tajikistan (Alay Mountains and Trans-Alay Range). West of this is the Turkestan Range, which continues almost to Samarkand.

== Ice Age ==
The Tian Shan plateau, stretching 100 to 120 km wide, is located on the northern margin of the Tarim Basin between the Kokshaal-Tau mountain chain to the south and the Terskey Alatau mountain chain to the north. The Kokshaal-Tau extends for 570 km from Pik Dankowa in the west to Pik Pobeda in the east-northeast. This mountain chain, along with the parallel Terskey Alatau and the Tian Shan plateau in between, were covered by connected ice-stream-networks and a plateau glacier during glacial times. The only remaining interglacial remnant of this glaciation is the 61 km long South Inylschek glacier. The outlet glacier tongues of the plateau glacier flowed northward down to Lake Issyk Kul, calving in this 160 km long lake.

Similarly, strong glaciation was present in the high mountain area of the Kungey Alatau, which stretches for 230 km north of Issyk Kul and connects to the mountain foreland near Alma Ata. The glacial glaciers from the Kungey Alatau also calved into Lake Issyk Kul, with the Ak-Sai valley glacier developing a mountain foreland glacier. The Chon-Kemin valley was glaciated up to its inflow into the Chu valley.

Altogether, the glacial Tian Shan glaciation occupied an area of approximately 118,000 square kilometers. The glacier snowline was about 1200m lower during the last ice age than it is today. This would result in a depression of the average annual temperature of 7.2 to 8.4 °C for the Last Glacial Maximum compared with today, assuming a comparable precipitation ratio.

== Ecology ==
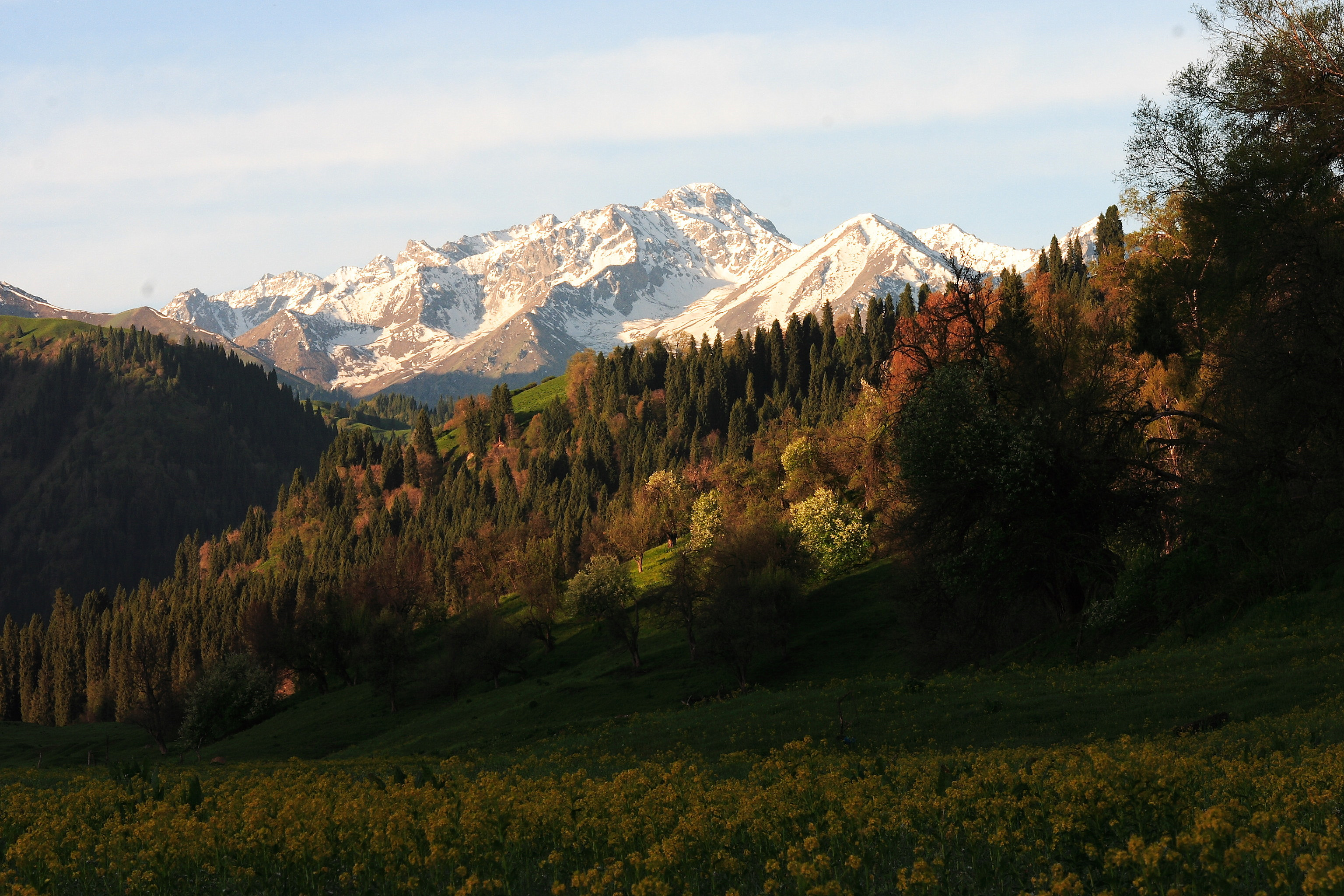
Koldeneng Valley in Ili Prefecture

The Tian Shan holds important forests of Schrenk's spruce (Picea schrenkiana) at altitudes of over 2,000 metres (6,600 ft); the lower slopes have unique natural forests of wild walnuts and apples.

The Tian Shan in its immediate geological past was kept from glaciation due to the "protecting" warm influence of the Indian Ocean monsoon climate. This defined its ecological features which could sustain its distinctive ecosphere. The mountains were subjected to constant geological changes with constantly evolving drainage systems which affected the patterns of vegetation, as well as exposing fertile soil for newly emerging seedlings to thrive in.

Tulips originated in the Tian Shan Mountains. The plant then made its way to Turkey via the Silk Road and became a symbol of the Ottoman Empire.

Ancestors of important crop vegetation were established and thrived in the area, among them: apricots (Prunus armeniaca), pears (Pyrus spp.), pomegranates (Punica granatum), figs (Ficus), cherries (Prunus avium) and mulberries (Morus). The Tian Shan region also included important animals like bears, deer, and wild boar, which helped to spread seeds and expand ecological diversity.

Among the vegetation colonizing the Tian Shan came, likely via birds from the east, the ancestors of what we know as the "sweet" apple. The fruit probably then looked like a tiny, long-stalked, bitter apple something like Malus baccata, the Siberian crab. The pips may have been carried in a bird's crop or clotted onto feet or feathers.

What natural features of the unique Tian Shan might have contributed to this rigorous selection program? Time is, as we have seen, not a problem. The turnover of individual trees is likewise conducive to the rapid evolution of a tree species, as is the fact that sweet apples are now, at least for all practical purposes, self-incompatible—that is, they cannot pollinate themselves. Therefore each apple tree within the forest and even each pip, usually five, within each individual fruit will be different. There are many apples on a mature tree, so natural selection has a rich and diverse population upon which to work. Birds, of course, eat all manner of fruit. But most birds eat seeds—a dietary feature not conducive either to the selection or spread of a fruit tree. Sweet apples are often eviscerated by birds, but the seeds are frequently left in the empty shell of the pome. The reason is that apple (and pear and quince) seeds are rich in cyanoglycosides, which are highly repellent, particularly to birds... Moreover, the placenta of the apple fruit, the womb, contains inhibitory substances that prevent the germination of the apple seed in situ. This is a commonly observed phenomenon in fruits as Michael Evenari showed in 1949. So what then does, or did, distribute the original apple seed? The bear...

— Barrie E. Juniper

The strain of Y. pestis which caused the bubonic plague now know as the Black Death may have originated in the Tian Shan, spreading along the Silk Road and killing half of Europe's population in the mid 1300s.

== Climate ==
Tian Shan has an alpine climate (Köppen climate classification ETH).

Climate data for Tian Shan (Urumqi Glacier No.1), (elevation 3,539 m (11,611 ft), (1991–2020 normals, extremes 1981–2010)
Month	Jan	Feb	Mar	Apr	May	Jun	Jul	Aug	Sep	Oct	Nov	Dec	Year
Record high °C (°F)	0.4 (32.7)	2.2 (36.0)	8.5 (47.3)	13.2 (55.8)	15.5 (59.9)	15.6 (60.1)	19.2 (66.6)	18.5 (65.3)	16.4 (61.5)	11.2 (52.2)	6.5 (43.7)	3.2 (37.8)	19.2 (66.6)
Mean daily maximum °C (°F)	−10.8 (12.6)	−8.6 (16.5)	−4.1 (24.6)	1.3 (34.3)	5.0 (41.0)	8.7 (47.7)	10.8 (51.4)	10.5 (50.9)	6.9 (44.4)	0.9 (33.6)	−4.8 (23.4)	−8.9 (16.0)	0.6 (33.0)
Daily mean °C (°F)	−15.3 (4.5)	−13.5 (7.7)	−9.5 (14.9)	−4.3 (24.3)	−0.2 (31.6)	3.7 (38.7)	5.9 (42.6)	5.3 (41.5)	1.5 (34.7)	−4.1 (24.6)	−9.5 (14.9)	−13.4 (7.9)	−4.4 (24.0)
Mean daily minimum °C (°F)	−19.1 (−2.4)	−17.6 (0.3)	−13.8 (7.2)	−8.4 (16.9)	−4.2 (24.4)	0.0 (32.0)	2.2 (36.0)	1.6 (34.9)	−2.2 (28.0)	−7.8 (18.0)	−13.2 (8.2)	−17.2 (1.0)	−8.3 (17.0)
Record low °C (°F)	−39.7 (−39.5)	−34.7 (−30.5)	−31.2 (−24.2)	−24.6 (−12.3)	−18.8 (−1.8)	−12.9 (8.8)	−6.9 (19.6)	−14.4 (6.1)	−17.5 (0.5)	−21.8 (−7.2)	−36.4 (−33.5)	−35.5 (−31.9)	−39.7 (−39.5)
Average precipitation mm (inches)	2.5 (0.10)	4.5 (0.18)	11.8 (0.46)	34.3 (1.35)	59.6 (2.35)	108.3 (4.26)	133.8 (5.27)	98.7 (3.89)	40.8 (1.61)	14.1 (0.56)	5.8 (0.23)	2.9 (0.11)	517.1 (20.37)
Average precipitation days (≥ 0.1 mm)	3.6	5.5	9.0	14.4	18.4	21.6	23.1	19.4	13.7	8.5	4.7	3.6	145.5
Average snowy days	5.0	6.5	9.9	14.9	19.1	15.2	9.8	9.3	13.4	10.0	5.6	4.4	123.1
Average relative humidity (%)	48	50	52	59	63	70	71	67	61	54	50	48	58
Mean monthly sunshine hours	144.1	172.5	231.0	250.5	250.8	215.9	212.7	232.7	225.2	208.4	153.4	134.2	2,431.4
Percentage possible sunshine	49	57	62	62	55	47	46	55	61	62	54	48	55
Source: China Meteorological Administration

Climate data for Tian Shan (Kyrgyzstan weather station), 1991–2020 normals
Month	Jan	Feb	Mar	Apr	May	Jun	Jul	Aug	Sep	Oct	Nov	Dec	Year
Daily mean °C (°F)	−19.4 (−2.9)	−16.8 (1.8)	−10.9 (12.4)	−4.5 (23.9)	−0.1 (31.8)	3.3 (37.9)	5.6 (42.1)	5.0 (41.0)	1.4 (34.5)	−5.1 (22.8)	−12.1 (10.2)	−17.3 (0.9)	−5.9 (21.4)
Source: NOAA

== Religion ==
=== Tengrism ===
In Tengrism, Khan Tengri is the lord of all spirits and the religion's supreme deity, and it is the name given to the second highest peak of the Tian Shan.

=== Islam ===
Around 950 CE, Satuq Bughra Khan converted to Islam, marking a major turning point in the spread of Islam among the Turkic peoples of the Tian Shan region and Central Asia.

== See also ==
- Pyotr Semyonov-Tyan-Shansky
- Tectonics of the Tian Shan
