= Chundzha =

Chundzha Чонҗа Шонжы
- Village
- Location in Kazakhstan
- Coordinates: 43°32′30″N 79°28′13″E
- Country: Kazakhstan
- Region: Almaty Region
- District: Uygur District

Population (2019)
  - Total: 17,263
- Time zone: UTC+6 (Time in Kazakhstan)

Chundzha (Uyghur: Чонҗа, Chonja, Kazakh: Шонжы, Şonjy) is a selo and the administrative center of Uygur District of the Almaty Region in south-eastern Kazakhstan. It is located on the A352 road.

== Population ==
Its population was 18,008 (2009 census results); and 20,095 (1999 census results).

== Thermal springs in Chundzha ==
The most famous thermal baths are located in the village of Chundzha, 250 km from Almaty, where the journey by car takes about 4–4.5 hours. The water in the springs has a high content of radon and silicon. Water from the thermal springs is used to treat various conditions, including diseases of the gastrointestinal and respiratory tracts.

According to studies carried out in 2010, the water in the springs of the Karadalinsky field in the Uygur district of the Almaty region is a medicinal and potable, weakly mineralized acrotherm (hypertherm) with a complex sodium sulfate-hydrocarbonate-chloride composition.

== Origin of the name ==
Focusing on the work of the Mongolian language researcher Napil Bazylkhan, Alimgazy Dauletkhan left the following notes in the name of Chundzha: The last toponymic name of the fortress at the junction of nine roads, built by the heirs to the throne of Genghis Khan and monitoring military and trade routes (station, fire—meaning Lenger-Chundzha), came down to us as "Chundzha". “In the modern Mongolian language, it occurs in the form of Conji. In the Kazakh language it is found as a toponym represented by "Шонжы".

The meaning of the word "Conji" in the Mongolian language: 1. A high rock that guards from afar. 2. (figurative) Fortress; Fortification protecting the border areas”. Therefore, the word Conji translated into the Kazakh language is now used as "Chundzha" or “Шонжы”. In East Turkestan, near the city of Ürümqi, there is a district called "Shonzhi" where local Kazakhs are densely populated.

According to a report made by Russian colonel Nikolai Friederiks in 1869, the toponym "Chundzja" comes from the name of the Chinese citizen Junji of the Taranchi tribe.
