= Uygur District =

Uygur
- District
- Ұйғыр ауданы
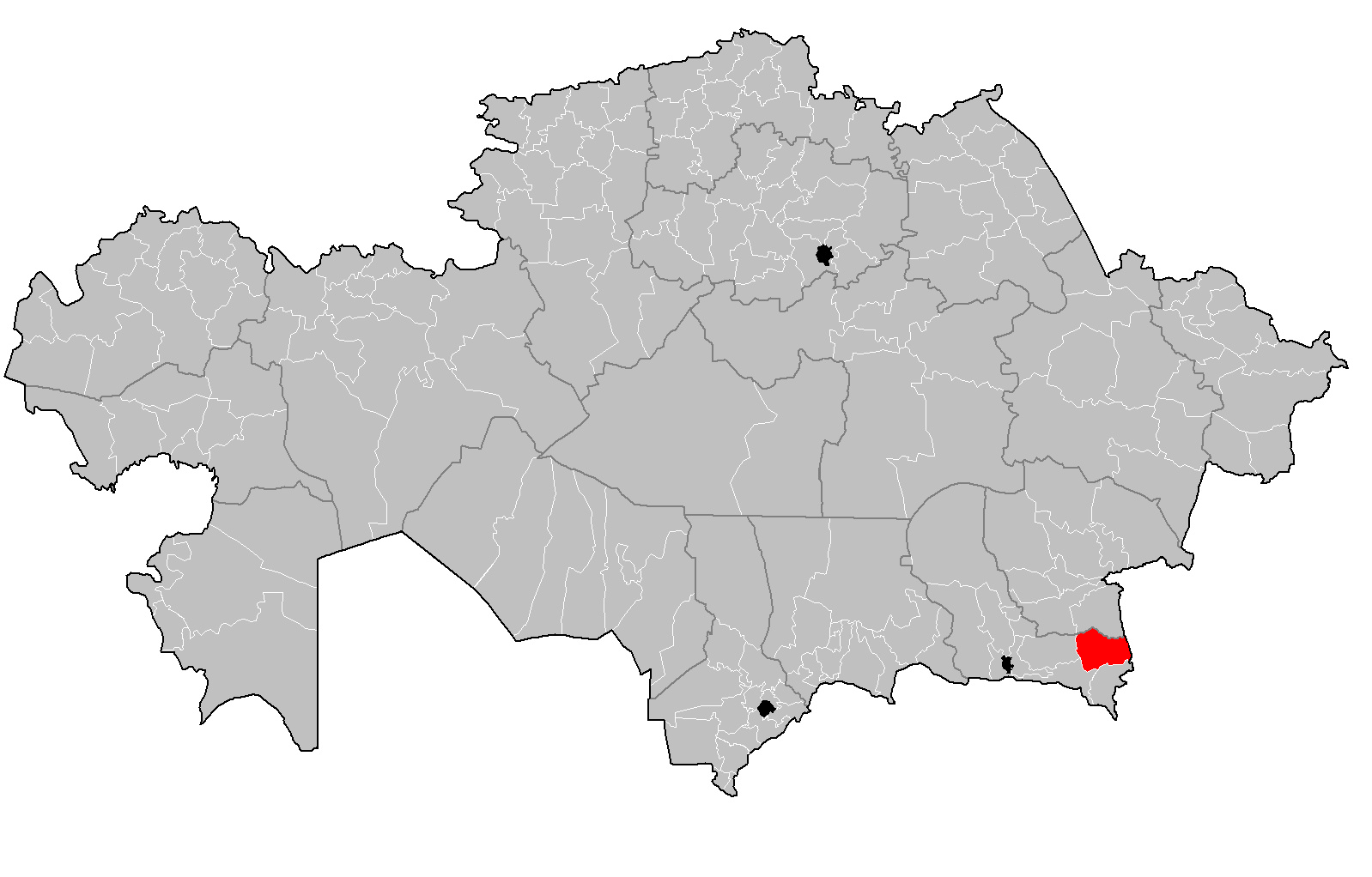
- Coordinates: 43.5406°N 79.4648°E
- Country: Kazakhstan
- Region: Almaty Region
- Administrative center: Chundzha
- Founded: 1934

Government
  - Akim (mayor): Bota Eleusizova

Area
  - Total: 3,400 sq mi (8,700 km^{2})

Population (2013)
  - Total: 62,316
- Time zone: UTC+6 (East)

Uygur District (Kazakh: Ұйғыр ауданы, Ūiğyr audany) is a district of Almaty Region in Kazakhstan. The administrative center of the district is the selo of Chundzha. Population: 62,316 (2013 estimate); 60,792 (2009 census results); 62,981 (1999 census results). Kazakhs 40.6% Uyghurs 57%

== Geography ==
It is located in the southeastern part of the Almaty region in the foothills of the Trans-Ili Alatau, between the Ketmen ridge and the plain of the Ili River depression.

On the territory of the district there is a relic grove of Sogdian ash - a natural monument of national importance. On the territory of this grove, 34 species of plants listed in the Red Book grow, more than 60 species of mammals, 300 species of birds and more than 20 species of amphibians live.

Another attraction is the Charyn Canyon or the "Valley of Castles".

Between the Ketmen mountains and the valley of the Ili river there are thermal (hot) artesian springs with low-mineralized radon water.
