= List of mountains in China =

The following is an incomplete list of mountains in the People's Republic of China, sorted in alphabetical order. Some of these mountains that are claimed by the PRC, including those under the control of the Republic of China and those disputed with other countries, such as Mount Everest, are noted after the list.

== List ==
| Mountain | Image | Province-level division | Elevation | Notes |
|---|---|---|---|---|
| Amne Machin | | Qinghai | 6,282 metres (20,610 ft) | |
| Badaling | | Beijing | 1,015 metres (3,330 ft) | |
| Paektu Mountain | | Jilin | 2,744 metres (9,003 ft) | The highest peak in both Northeast China and the Korean Peninsula |
| Baishi Mountain | | Hebei | 2,096 metres (6,877 ft) | AAAAA-level tourist attraction |
| Baiyun Mountain | | Guangdong | 382 metres (1,253 ft) | |
| Mount Beiwudang | | Shanxi | | |
| Bijia Mountain | | Liaoning | 78 metres (256 ft) | |
| Bogda Peak | | Xinjiang | 5,445 metres (17,864 ft) | |
| Broad Peak | | Xinjiang/Pakistan | 8,051 metres (26,414 ft) | |
| Bukadaban Feng | | Qinghai/Xinjiang | 6,860 metres (22,507 ft) | |
| Mount Cangyan | | Hebei | 1,000 metres (3,281 ft) | |
| Chakragil | | Xinjiang | 6,760 metres (22,178 ft) | |
| Nyonno Ri | | Tibet | 6,724 metres (22,060 ft) | |
| Changla | | Tibet | 6,721 metres (22,051 ft) | |
| Changzheng Ri | | Tibet | 6,916 metres (22,690 ft) | |
| Mount Chishi | | Guangdong | 380 metres (1,247 ft) | |
| Chomo Lonzo | | Tibet | 7,804 metres (25,604 ft) | Subsidiary peak of Makalu (5th highest in the world) |
| Chongtar Kangri | | Xinjiang | 7,315 metres (23,999 ft) | |
| Dahei Mountain | | Liaoning | 663 metres (2,175 ft) | |
| Mount Danxia | | Guangdong | | |
| Daxue Mountain | | Yunnan | 3,500 metres (11,483 ft) | Ultra prominent peak of Southeast Asia |
| Dinghu Mountain | | Guangdong | | |
| Mount Dingjun | | Shaanxi | | |
| Mount Du | | Henan | 368 metres (1,207 ft) | |
| Dunheger | | Xinjiang | 3,325 metres (10,909 ft) | |
| Dunhong | | Xinjiang | | |
| Mount Emei | | Sichuan | 3,099 metres (10,167 ft) | |
| Mount Erlang | | Sichuan | | |
| Mount Everest | | Tibet/Nepal | 8,848 metres (29,029 ft) | The highest peak in the world. Located in Nepal and China. |
| Geladaindong Peak | | Qinghai | 6,621 metres (21,722 ft) | |
| Mount Genyen | | Sichuan | 6,204 metres (20,354 ft) | |
| Kharta Changri | | Tibet | 7,056 metres (23,150 ft) | |
| Mount Gongga | | Sichuan | 7,556 metres (24,790 ft) | The highest peak in Sichuan and the easternmost 7,000 m (23,000 ft)+ peak worldwide |
| Gora Alagordy | | Xinjiang | 4,622 metres (15,164 ft) | |
| Haba Xueshan | | Yunnan | 5,396 metres (17,703 ft) | |
| Mount Heng (Hunan) | | Hunan | 1,300 metres (4,265 ft) | |
| Mount Heng (Shanxi) | | Shanxi | 2,017 metres (6,617 ft) | |
| Mount Hua | | Shaanxi | 2,160 metres (7,087 ft) | |
| Mount Huangbo | | Fujian | | |
| Huangyajian Peak | | Zhejiang | 1,921 metres (6,302 ft) | |
| Khüiten Peak | | Xinjiang | 4,374 metres (14,350 ft) | |
| Hunhua Shan | | Yunnan | 3,420 metres (11,220 ft) | Ultra prominent peak of Southeast Asia |
| Jade Dragon Snow Mountain | | Yunnan | 5,596 metres (18,360 ft) | |
| Jengish Chokusu | | Xinjiang | 7,439 metres (24,406 ft) | |
| Jiangjun Mountain | | Jiangsu | | |
| Mount Jianglang | | Zhejiang | 817 metres (2,680 ft) | |
| Mount Jiuhua | | Anhui | | |
| Mount Jizu | | Yunnan | 3,240 metres (10,630 ft) | |
| Jongsong Peak | | Tibet | 7,462 metres (24,482 ft) | |
| K2 | | Xinjiang/Pakistan | 8,611 metres (28,251 ft) | Located in both Pakistani-administered Kashmir and China. The second-highest mountain globally. |
| Mount Kailash | | Tibet | 6,638 metres (21,778 ft) | |
| Kalamely Mountain | | Xinjiang | | |
| Kangpenqing | | Tibet | 7,281 metres (23,888 ft) | |
| Kangphu Kang | | Tibet | 7,204 metres (23,635 ft) | On Tibet/Bhutan border |
| Kangto | | Tibet/India | 7,060 metres (23,163 ft) | Located in both India and China, |
| Kangze Gyai | | Qinghai | 5,808 metres (19,055 ft) | |
| Karjiang | | Tibet | 7,221 metres (23,691 ft) | |
| Kawagarbo | | Yunnan | 6,740 metres (22,113 ft) | |
| Kezhen Peak | | Xinjiang | 7,038 metres (23,091 ft) | |
| Khartaphu | | Tibet | 7,213 metres (23,665 ft) | |
| Khumbutse | | Tibet | 6,636 metres (21,772 ft) | |
| Kitten Mountain | | Guangxi | 2,142 metres (7,028 ft) | The highest peak in the Guangxi Zhuang Autonomous Region |
| Cat Mountain | | Fujian | 516 metres (1,693 ft) | |
| Kongur Tagh | | Xinjiang | 7,649 metres (25,095 ft) | |
| Kubi Gangri | | Tibet | 6,859 metres (22,503 ft) | |
| Labuche Kang | | Tibet | 7,367 metres (24,170 ft) | |
| Langtang Ri | | Tibet | 7,205 metres (23,638 ft) | |
| Laojun Mountain | | Yunnan | 4,513 metres (14,806 ft) | |
| Mount Langya | | Anhui | | |
| Mount Lao | | Shandong | 1,138 metres (3,734 ft) | |
| Lhotse | | Tibet/Nepal | 8,516 metres (27,940 ft) | |
| Mount Liang | | Shandong | 198 metres (650 ft) | |
| Lingtren | | Tibet | 6,749 metres (22,142 ft) | |
| Mount Lingyan | | Jiangsu | | |
| Mount Li | | Shaanxi | 1,302 metres (4,272 ft) | |
| Liushi Shan | | Tibet/Xinjiang | 7,167 metres (23,514 ft) | |
| Loenpo Gang | | Tibet | 6,979 metres (22,897 ft) | |
| Mount Longhu | | Jiangxi | | |
| Lunpo Gangri | | Tibet | 7,095 metres (23,278 ft) | |
| Mount Luofu | | Guangdong | | |
| Huangshan | | Anhui | 1,864 metres (6,115 ft) | |
| Makalu | | Tibet/Nepal | 8,481 metres (27,825 ft) | |
| Mazong Mountain | | Gansu | 2,584 metres (8,478 ft) | |
| Mianzimu | | Yunnan | 6,054 metres (19,862 ft) | |
| Mount Jinfo | | Chongqing | 2,238 metres (7,343 ft) | |
| Mount Longmen (Shanxi) | | Shanxi | 1,087 metres (3,566 ft) | |
| Mount Mian | | Shanxi | 2,440 metres (8,005 ft) | An important Taoist center, associated with the origin of the Cold Food Festival. Also formerly known as Mt Jie. |
| Mount Mogan | | Zhejiang | | |
| Moon Hill | | Guangxi | | |
| Muztagh Ata | | Xinjiang | 7,546 metres (24,757 ft) | |
| Nairamdal Peak | | Xinjiang | 4,180 metres (13,714 ft) | |
| Nyegyi Kansang | | Tibet | 7,060 metres (23,163 ft) | Located in both India and China |
| Mount Pan | | Tianjin | 858 metres (2,815 ft) | |
| Phu Si Lung | | Yunnan | 3,076 metres (10,092 ft) | |
| Mount Pomiu | | Sichuan | 5,413 metres (17,759 ft) | |
| Porong Ri | | Tibet | 7,292 metres (23,924 ft) | |
| Pumori | | Tibet | 7,161 metres (23,494 ft) | |
| Purple Mountain | | Jiangsu | 447 metres (1,467 ft) | |
| Mount Putuo | | Zhejiang | | |
| Qianling Mountain | | Guizhou | 1,500 metres (4,921 ft) | |
| Mount Qingcheng | | Sichuan | | |
| Qionglong Mountain | | Suzhou | 341.7 metres (1,121 ft) | |
| Qixia Mountain | | Jiangsu | 286 metres (938 ft) | |
| Mount Qiyun | | Anhui | 585 metres (1,919 ft) | |
| Ratna Chuli | | Tibet | 7,035 metres (23,081 ft) | |
| Mount Sanqing | | Jiangxi | 1,817 metres (5,961 ft) | |
| Sauyr Zhotasy | | Xinjiang | 3,840 metres (12,598 ft) | |
| Shenguang Mountain | | Guangdong | | |
| Shennong Mountain | | Henan | 1,028 metres (3,373 ft) | |
| Shiceng Dashan | | Yunnan | 1,830 metres (6,004 ft) | Tripoint |
| Shiren Mountain | | Henan | 2,153 metres (7,064 ft) | |
| Siguang Ri | | Tibet | 7,308 metres (23,976 ft) | |
| Shishapangma | | Tibet | 8,013 metres (26,289 ft) | The lowest Eight-thousander |
| Simian Mountain | | Chongqing | | |
| Skyang Kangri | | Xinjiang | 7,545 metres (24,754 ft) | |
| Mount Song | | Henan | 1,500 metres (4,921 ft) | |
| Mount Taibai | | Shaanxi | 3,767 metres (12,359 ft) | |
| Mount Tai | | Shandong | 1,533 metres (5,030 ft) | |
| Mount Tangjia | | Sichuan | | |
| Tavan Bogd | | Xinjiang | 4,374 metres (14,350 ft) | The highest peak in Mongolia |
| Teram Kangri | | Xinjiang | 7,462 metres (24,482 ft) | |
| The Crown (mountain) | | Xinjiang | 7,295 metres (23,934 ft) | |
| Mount Tiandang | | Shaanxi | | |
| Tianmen Mountain | | Hunan | | |
| Tianmu Mountain | | Zhejiang | 1,506 metres (4,941 ft) | |
| Mount Tiantai | | Zhejiang | 1,138 metres (3,734 ft) | |
| Tiantangzhai | | Anhui/Hubei | 1,729 metres (5,673 ft) | |
| Tianzhong Mountain | | Henan | | |
| Mount Tianzhu | | Anhui | 1,760 metres (5,774 ft) | |
| Tianzi Mountain | | Hunan | | |
| Tomort | | Xinjiang | 4,886 metres (16,030 ft) | |
| Tuoshan | | Sichuan | | |
| Mount Wangwu | | Henan | | |
| Wugai Mountain | | Hunan | 1,600 metres (5,249 ft) | |
| Wunü Mountain | | Liaoning | 821 metres (2,694 ft) | |
| Wushao Ling Mountain | | Gansu | | |
| Mount Wutai | | Shanxi | 3,058 metres (10,033 ft) | Highest peak in north China |
| Wutong Mountain | | Guangdong | 944 metres (3,097 ft) | |
| Wuzhi Mountain | | Hainan | 1,840 metres (6,037 ft) | |
| Xiao Mountain | | Henan | 1,903 metres (6,243 ft) | |
| Mount Xiqiao | | Guangdong | 346 metres (1,135 ft) | |
| Mount Siguniang | | Sichuan | 6,250 metres (20,505 ft) | |
| Mount Xuebaoding | | Sichuan | 5,588 metres (18,333 ft) | |
| Xuelian Feng | | Xinjiang | 6,627 metres (21,742 ft) | |
| Xueshan | | Taiwan | 3,886 metres (12,749 ft) | Controlled by the Republic of China |
| Yangmolong | | Sichuan | 6,060 metres (19,882 ft) | |
| Yiwulü Mountain | | Liaoning | 867 metres (2,844 ft) | |
| Yu Shan | | Taiwan | 3,952 metres (12,966 ft) | Controlled by the Republic of China |
| Yuelu Mountain | | Hunan | 300 metres (984 ft) | |
| Yun Mountain | | Hunan | 1,372 metres (4,501 ft) | |
| Yunlong Mountain | | Jiangsu | | |
| Yuntai Mountain (Henan) | | Henan | 1,308 metres (4,291 ft) | |
| Yuzhu Peak | | Qinghai | 6,224 metres (20,420 ft) | |
| Zhaobao Mountain | | Zhejiang | | |
| Zimao Mountain | | Fujian | 518 metres (1,699 ft) | |
| Kunyu Mountain | | Shandong | 900 metres (2,953 ft) | |
| Changbai Mountains | | Heilongjiang | 2,000 metres (6,562 ft) | |
| Mount Tian | | Xinjiang | 7,439 metres (24,406 ft) | |
| Mountain Lu | | Jiangxi | 1,474 metres (4,836 ft) | |

== See also ==
- Geography of China
- Sacred Mountains of China
- Mountains of Southwest China
