= Potanin =

Potanin (Russian: Пота́нин) is a Russian surname. Notable people with the surname include:

- Grigory Potanin (1835–1920), Russian explorer
- Vladimir Potanin (born 1961), Russian businessman

== See also ==
- 9915 Potanin, asteroid
- Potanin Glacier, the longest glacier in Mongolia, named for Grigory Potanin
