= Baishi Mountain =

Mountain in Hebei, China

Coordinates: 39.213°N 114.706°E

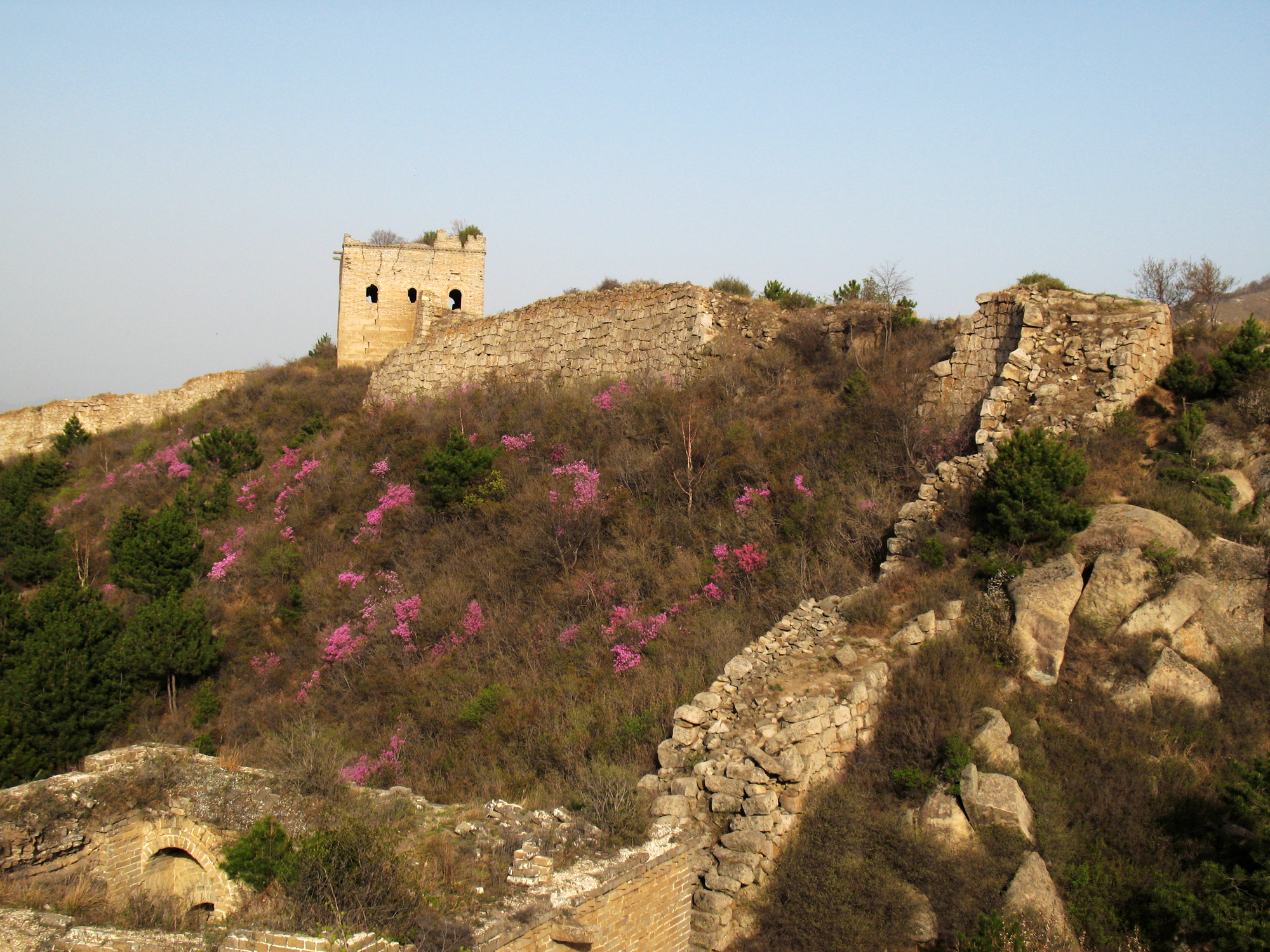
- Chinese: 白石山
- Literal meaning: White Stone Mountain
Transcriptions
Standard Mandarin
- Hanyu Pinyin: Báishíshān
- Wade–Giles: Pai-shih-shan

Baishi Scenic Area
- Traditional Chinese: 白石山景區
- Simplified Chinese: 白石山景区
Transcriptions
Standard Mandarin
- Hanyu Pinyin: Báishíshān jǐngqū
- Wade–Giles: Pai-shih-shan Ching-ch‘u

Baishi National Geological Park
- Traditional Chinese: 白石山國家地質公園
- Simplified Chinese: 白石山国家地质公园
Transcriptions
Standard Mandarin
- Hanyu Pinyin: Báishíshān Guójiā Dìzhì Gōngyuán
- Wade–Giles: Pai-shih-shan Kuo-chia Ti-chih Kung-yüan

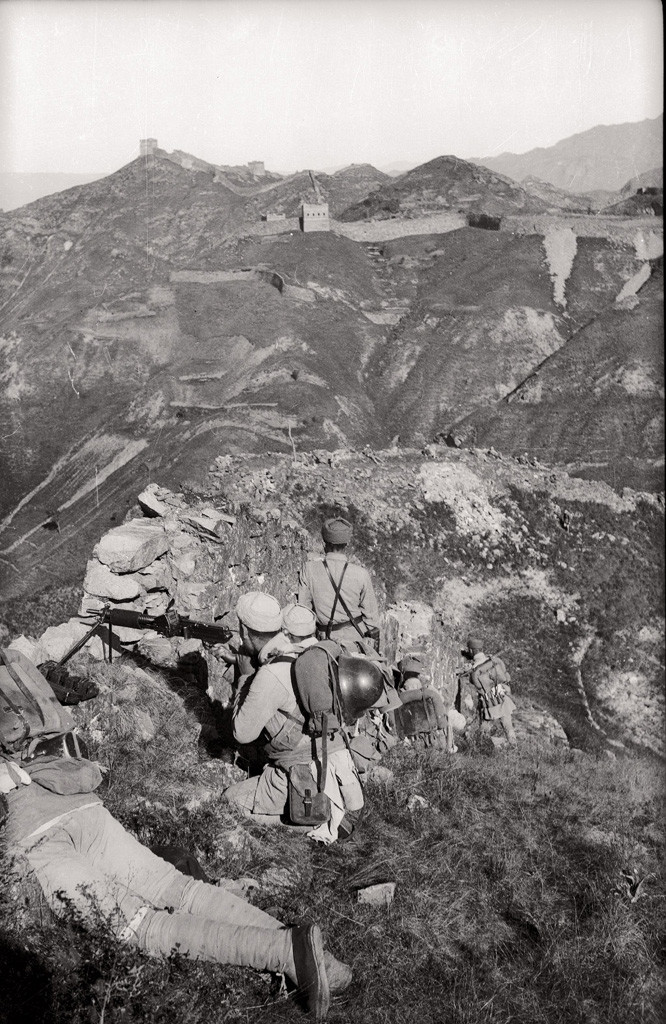
The foothills of Baishi Mountain saw parts of the 1937 Battle of the Great Wall during the Second Sino-Japanese War

Baishi Mountain, also known by its Chinese name Baishishan, (Note: Variations of the name include Mount Baishi, Mount Baishishan, Baishi Shan, Whitestone Mountain, and Whiterock Mountain.) is a mountain in Laiyuan County, Baoding Prefecture, Hebei Province, China. Its highest peak has an elevation of 2,096 meters (6,877 ft) and its main ridge stretches for over 7,000 meters (22,966 ft). Parts of the Great Wall snake around its foothills. Baishi Mountain forms the northern end of the Taihang Chain and is located about 200 kilometers (120 mi) southwest of Beijing.

== Background ==
Its name refers to the white marble making up parts of its bedrock. The roughly 20 km^{2} (7.7 sq mi) of dolomite making up the top of the mountain was formed about 1 billion to 700 million years ago and was pushed into place by about 54 km^{2} (21 sq mi) of newly forming granite created by a magma intrusion at the mountain's base about 140 mya.

China's National Tourism Administration established the Baishi Scenic Area in 2004. The same area was declared the Baishi National Geological Park when it was named a world geological park by UNESCO in September 2006. The CNTA declared it a AAAAA-level tourist attraction in early 2017. It is particularly well known for its appearance during overcast days, when the tops of nearby peaks can be seen jutting out from within low-lying clouds and mist. Since September 2014, it has also had China's longest, widest, and highest glass skywalk, stretching 95 meters (312 ft) over a ravine at an elevation of 1,900 meters (6,200 ft). A second skywalk opened in August 2015, with an elevation of 1,600 meters (5,200 ft). There is also a regional tourism campaign aimed at promoting the mountain as a spot for lovers.

The spider species Clubiona baishishan takes its name from its discovery near the mountain.

== See also ==
- List of mountains in the People's Republic of China
- List of AAAAA-rated tourist attractions in the People's Republic of China
