= Kangpenqing =

Mountain in Tibet, China

- Gang Ben Chen
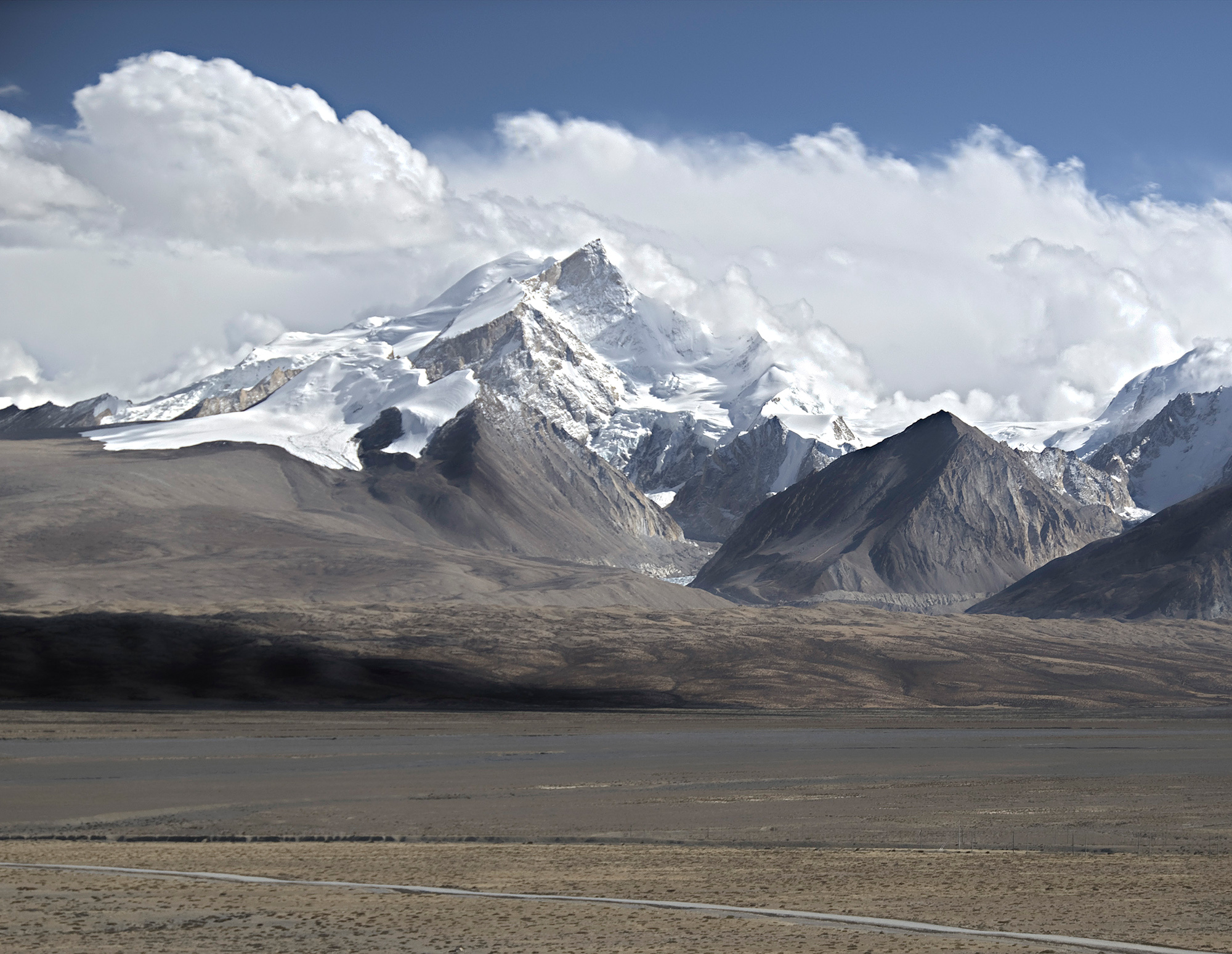

Highest point
- Elevation: 7,281 m (23,888 ft); Ranked 89th
- Prominence: 1,340 m (4,400 ft)
- Parent peak: Shishapangma
- Listing: Mountains of China
- Coordinates: 28°33′N 85°33′E

Geography
- Location within China
- Country: China
- Region: Tibet
- Parent range: Baiku Himalayas

Climbing
- First ascent: 21 April 1982
- Easiest route: snow/ice climb

Kangpenqing (also Gang Ben Chen) is a mountain in the Himalayas of Tibet, China. At an elevation of 7,281 m (23,888 ft), it is the 89th highest mountain in the world. The peak was first climbed in 1982 by a Japanese team.
