= Khüiten Peak =

Tallest mountain in the Altai range

Hüiten orgil
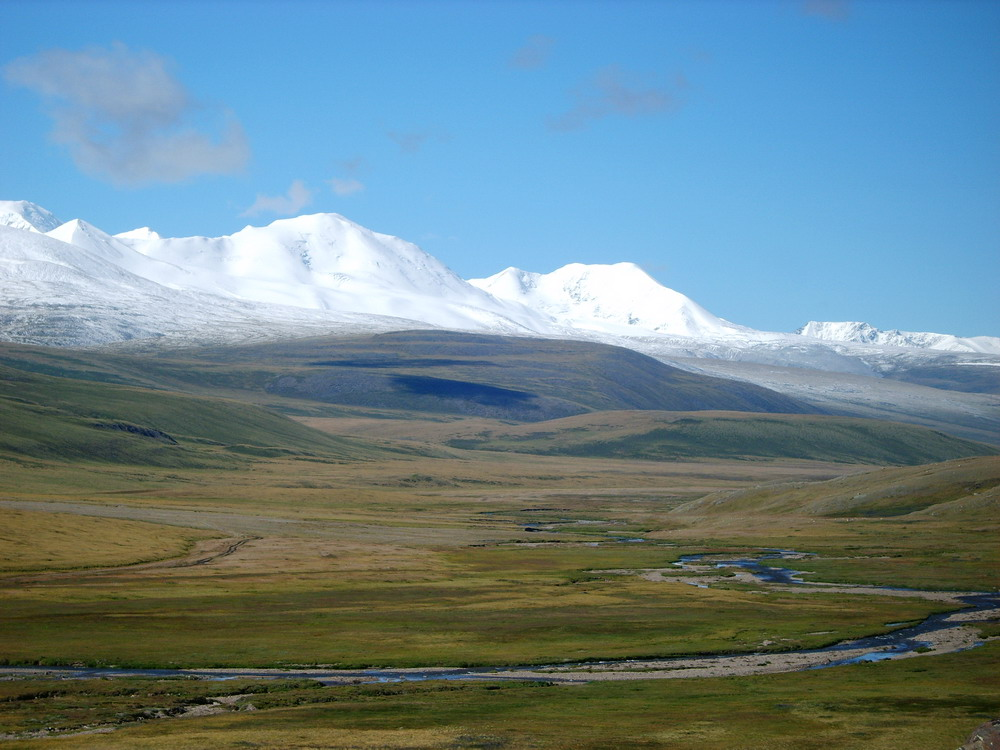

Highest point
- Elevation: 4,356 m (14,291 ft)
- Prominence: 2,324 m (7,625 ft)
- Listing: Country high point Ultra
- Coordinates: 49°8′45″N 87°49′8″E

Geography
- Location within Mongolia
- Location: China–Mongolia border
- Parent range: Tavan Bogd; Mongol-Altai Mountains

Khüiten Peak (Mongolian: Хүйтэн оргил [ˈxʉe̯tʰɘ̆ɴ ˈœɾɞ̆ɟɪɬ]; lit. 'Cold Peak'), also known in China as Friendship Peak (Chinese: 友谊峰; pinyin: Yǒuyí Fēng), is a mountain peak in the Altai Range. The international border between China and Mongolia runs across its summit point, which, at 4,356 metres (14,291 ft), is the highest point in the Altais and the highest in both Mongolia and Altay Prefecture in Western China. The peak is covered in snow year-round.

In the past, Khüiten Peak was also officially known in Mongolia as the "Friendship Peak" (Mongolian: Найрамдал уул, pronounced [ˈnæe̯ɾə̆mtɬ ˈoːɬ]).

Khüiten Peak is one of five peaks of the Tavan Bogd massif. Another peak, which is about 2.5 km north of it, marks the border tripoint between Russia, Mongolia, and China; the name of that peak is given in international agreements and on maps as Tavan Bogd Peak (Russian: Таван-Богдо-Ула, Tavan-Bogdo-Ula; Mongolian: Таван богд уул, Tabhan bogd uul), or Mount Kuitun (Chinese: 奎屯山; pinyin: Kuítún shān).

== See also ==
- List of Altai mountains
- List of ultras of Central Asia
- List of mountains in Mongolia
- List of mountains in China
- Nairamdal Peak (Friendship Peak)
- Malchin Peak

== Sources ==
- Peaklist.org: China II, Sinkiang - Xinjiang
- "Tavan Bogd Uul, Mongolia/China". Peakbagger.com.
- "Khüiten Peak". Peakware.com. Archived from the original on 2016-03-04.

== Bibliography ==
- Chistyakov, K. V.; Ganiushkin, D. A. (2015), "Glaciation and Thermokarst Phenomena and Natural Disasters in the Mountains of North-West Inner Asia", in Culshaw, Martin; Osipov, Victor; Booth, S.J.; et al. (eds.), Environmental Security of the European Cross-Border Energy Supply Infrastructure NATO Science for Peace and Security Series C: Environmental Security, Springer, pp. 207–218, ISBN 978-9401795388
- Krumwiede, Brandon S.; Kamp, Ulrich; Leonard, Gregory J.; Kargel, Jeffrey S.; Dashtseren, Avirmed; Walther, Michael (2014), "Recent Glacier Changes in the Mongolian Altai Mountains: Case Studies from Munkh Khairkhan and Tavan Bogd", in Kargel, Jeffrey Stuart (ed.), Global Land Ice Measurements from Space, Springer-Praxis series in geophysics, Springer, pp. 481–509, ISBN 978-3540798187
