= Zimao Mountain =

Mountain in Fujian, China

Coordinates: 24.890797°N 118.509007°E

Zimao Mountain (Chinese: 紫帽山; pinyin: Zǐmào Shān; Pe̍h-ōe-jī: Chí-bō-san) is a mountain located in Jinjiang City, a county-level city of Quanzhou County in Fujian Province of the East China region.

Its elevation is 517.8 metres (1,699 ft). It is a popular scenic area in the city and region.

== Features ==
Century Public Park, Min Moon Park, Athlete Park, and Riverside Park are located near Zimao Mountain. Since the Tang dynasty, many poets have visited and left their marks on Zimao Mountain.

The JIn River, one of the four major rivers of Fujian Province, flows by the mountain and Jinjiang City located on its south bank, and into northeastern Quanzhou Bay. Many historic Buddhist temples and structures were built around the mountain and along the river by various dynasties of Imperial China over the centuries.

== See also ==
- Mountains of Fujian
- Mountains of China
