= Changzheng Ri =

Mountain in Tibet, China

- 长征峰
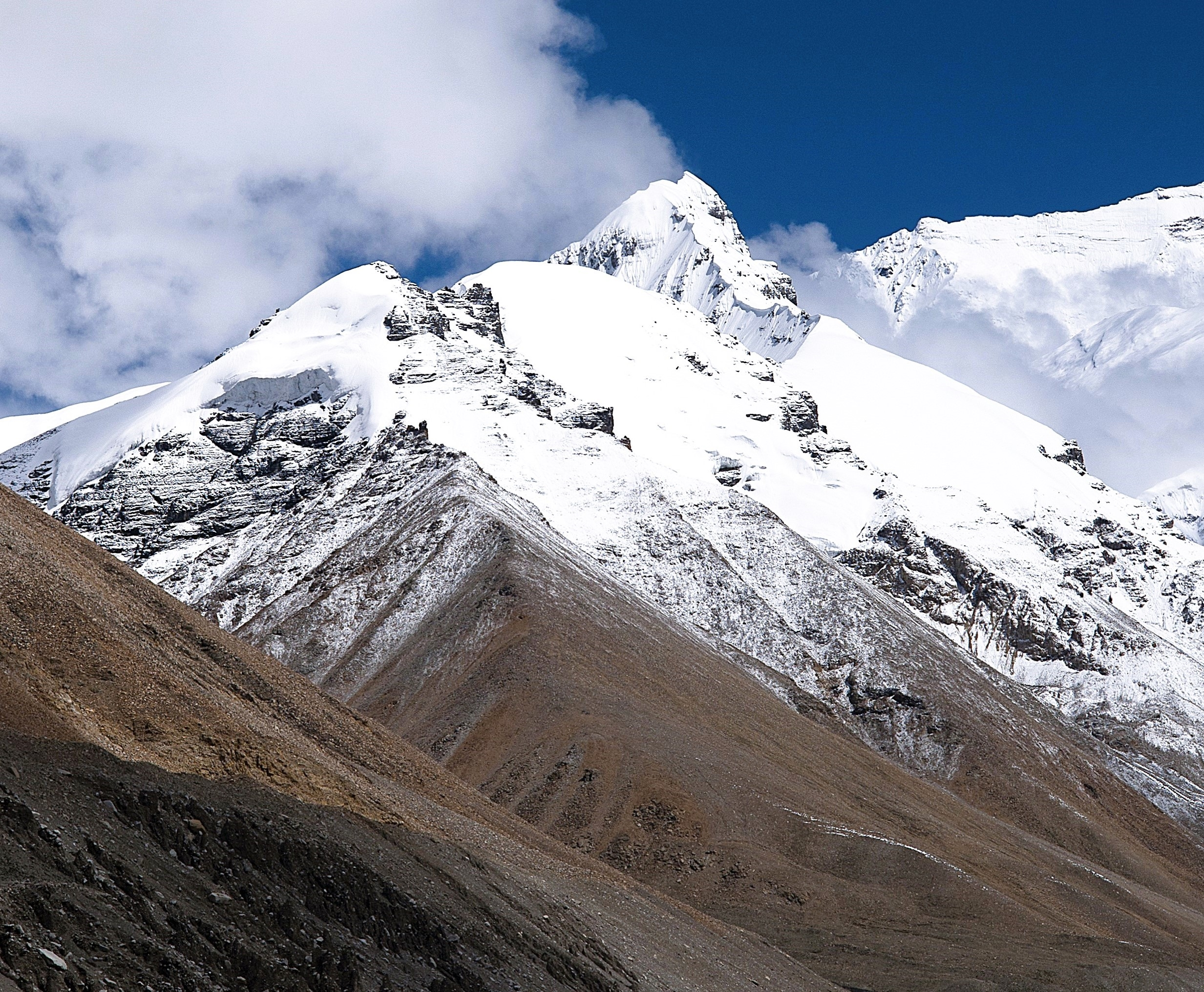
- North aspect

Highest point
- Elevation: 6,916 m (22,690 ft)
- Prominence: 516 m (1,693 ft)
- Parent peak: Mount Everest
- Isolation: 4 km (2.5 mi)
- Listing: Mountains of China
- Coordinates: 28°04′09″N 86°53′52″E

Geography
- Location within Tibet Location within China
- Interactive map of Changzheng Ri
- Country: China
- Region: Tibet
- County: Tingri
- Protected area: Qomolangma National Nature Preserve
- Parent range: Himalayas; Mahalangur Himal

Changzheng Ri (Chinese: 长征峰) is a mountain in Tibet, China.

== Description ==
Changzheng Ri is a 6,916-metre (22,690-foot) summit in the Himalayas of Tibet. It is situated five kilometres (3.1 mi) north of Changtse and nine kilometres (5.6 mi) north of Mount Everest in Qomolangma National Nature Preserve. Precipitation runoff from the mountain's slopes drains to the Rong River which is a tributary of the Arun River. Topographic relief is significant as the summit rises 1,366 metres (4,481 ft) above the Rongbuk Glacier in two kilometres (1.2 mi). The first ski descent from the peak was made in 2003 by Jimmy Chin.

== Climate ==
Based on the Köppen climate classification, Changzheng Ri is located in a tundra climate zone with cold, snowy winters, and cool summers. Weather systems are forced upwards by the Himalaya mountains (orographic lift), causing heavy precipitation in the form of rainfall and snowfall. Mid-June through early-August is the monsoon season. The months of April, May, September, and October offer the most favorable weather for viewing or climbing this peak.

== Gallery ==
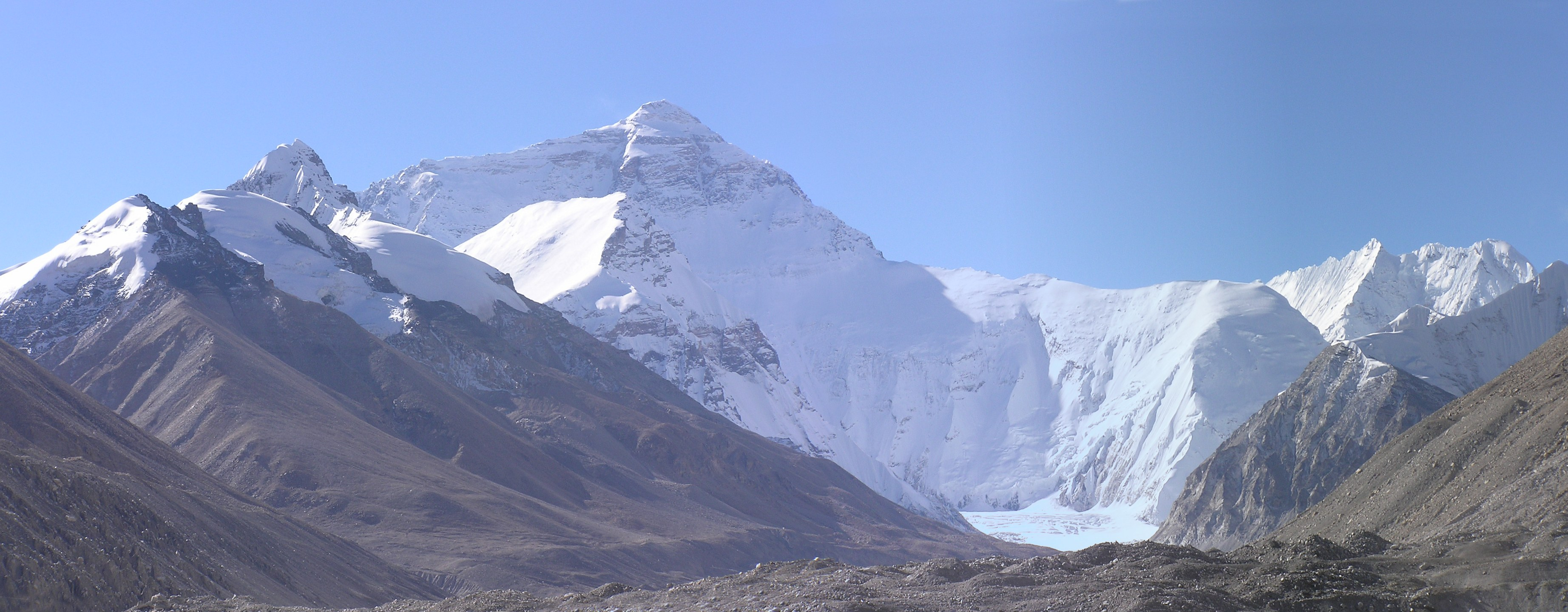
Changzheng Ri (left) with Mount Everest

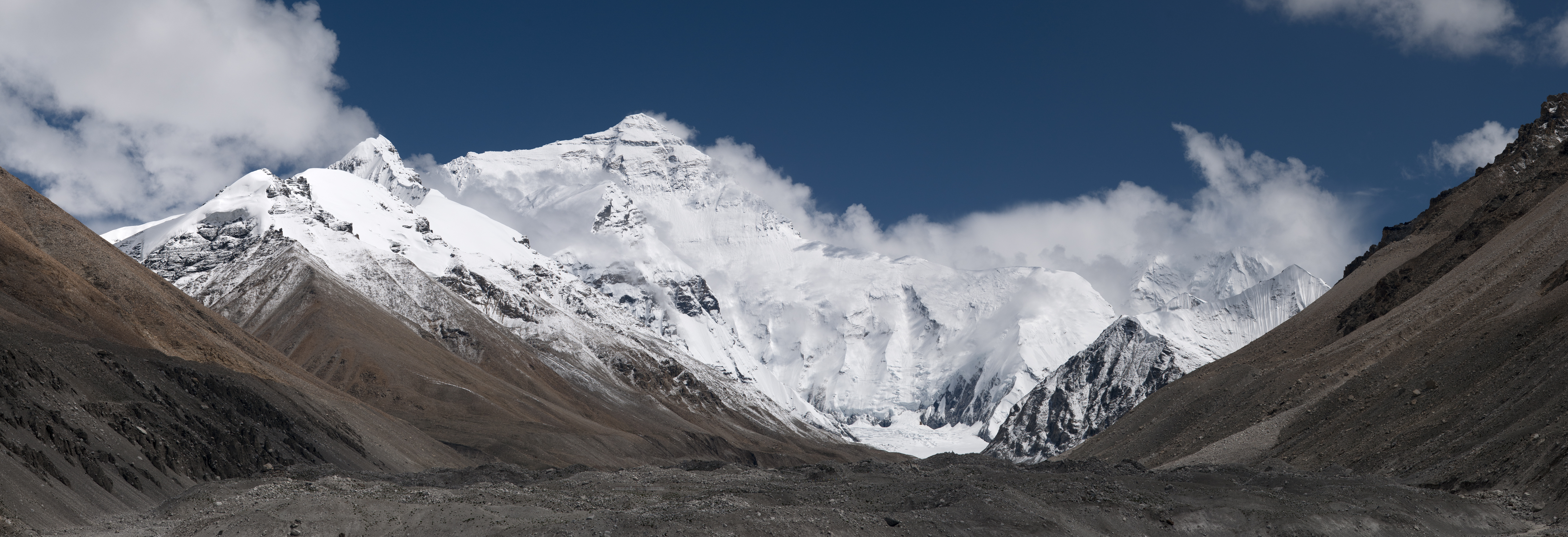
Changzheng Ri (left) with Mount Everest

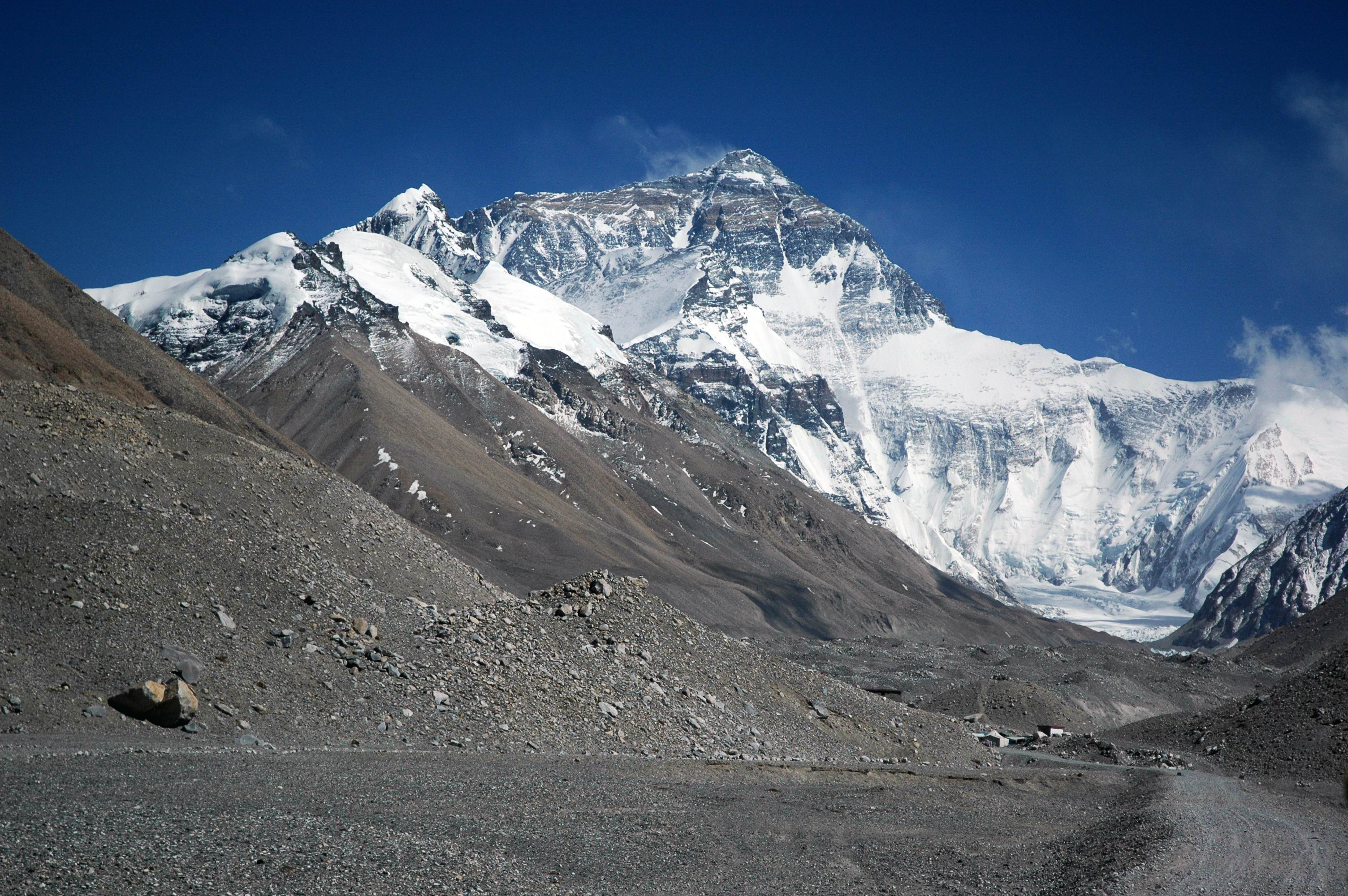
Changzheng Ri (left) with Mount Everest

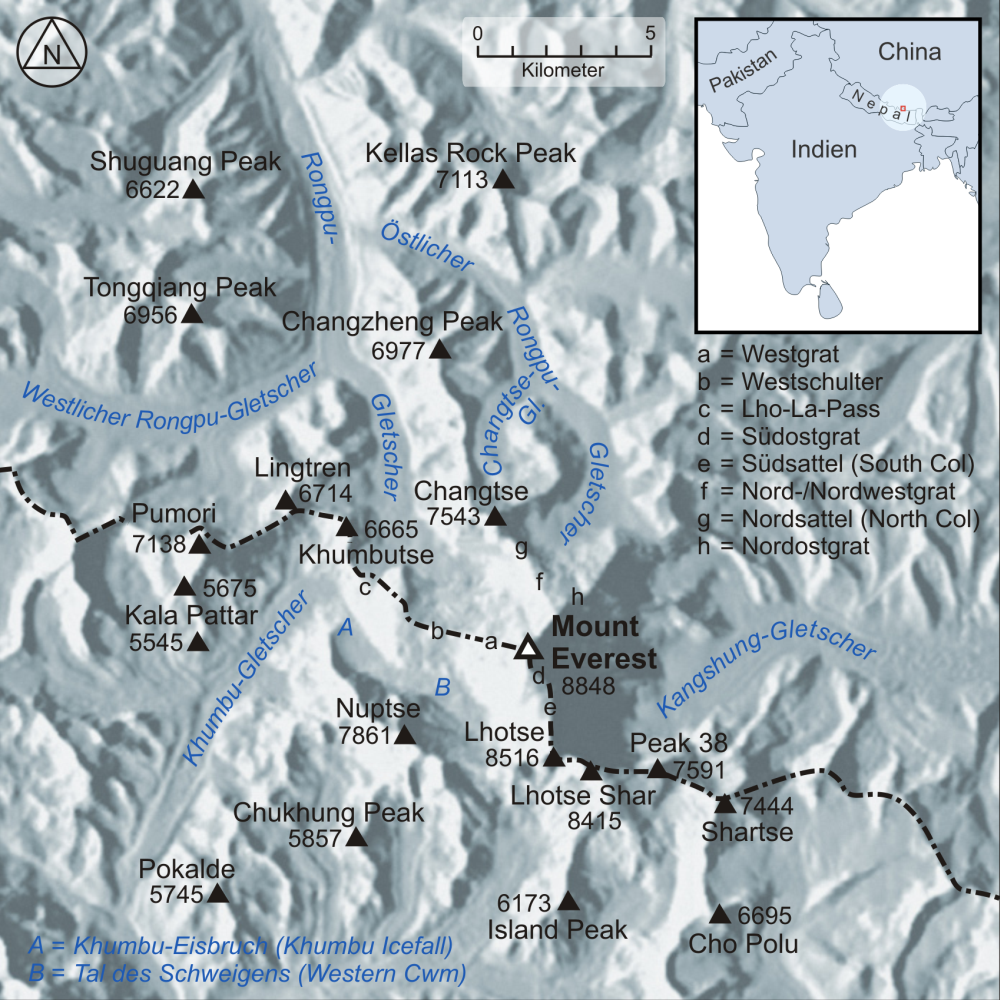

== See also ==
- Geology of the Himalayas
