= Siguang Ri =

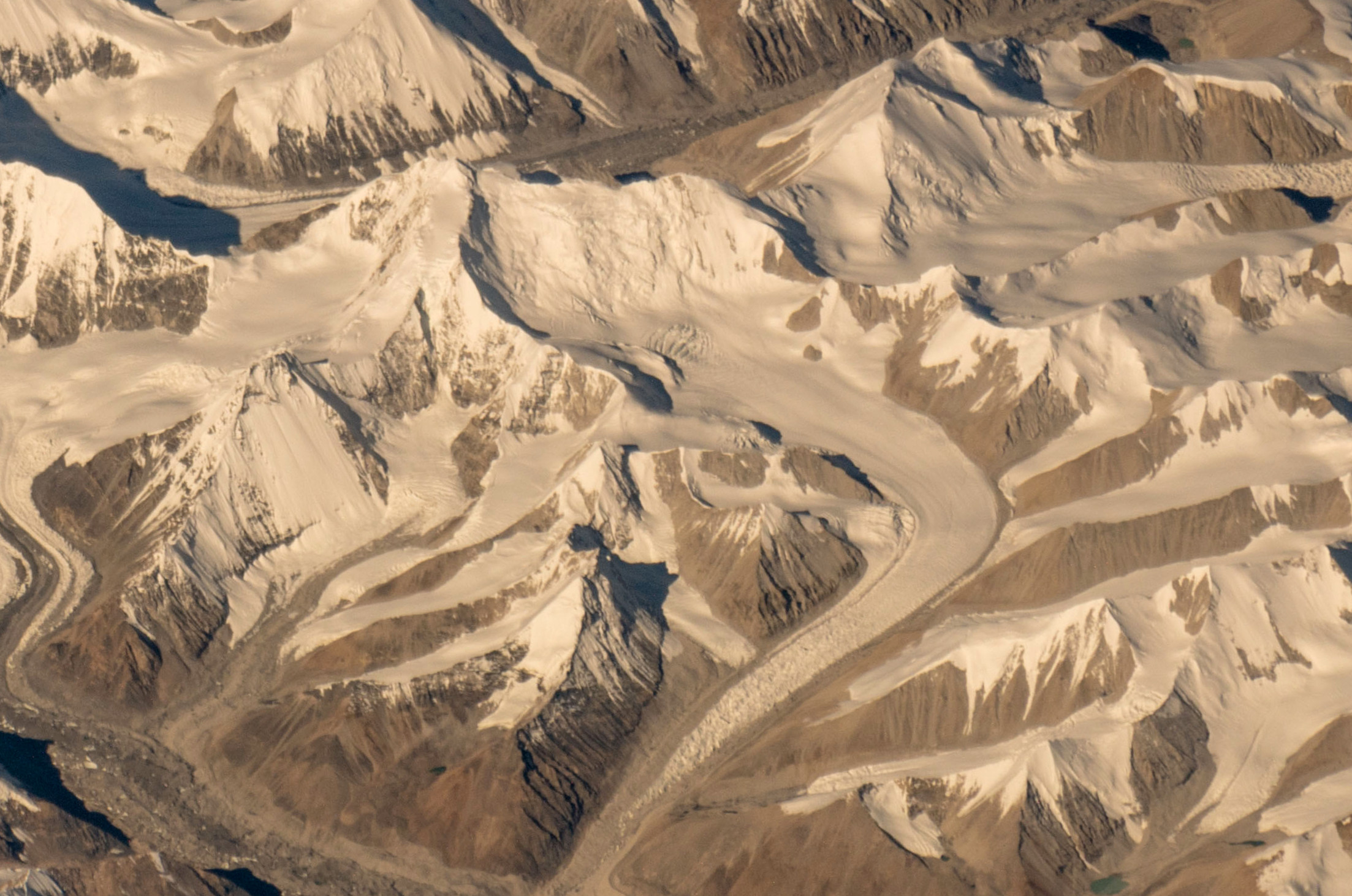
- Siguang Ri Shar, Siguang Ri, Siguang Ri Northwest

Highest point
- Elevation: 7,308 m (23,976 ft); Ranked 82nd
- Prominence: 650 m (2,130 ft)
- Parent peak: Cho Oyu
- Listing: Mountains of China
- Coordinates: 28°09′N 86°41′E

Geography
- Location within Tibet
- Location: Tibet, China
- Parent range: Mahalangur, Himalayas

Climbing
- First ascent: 1989
- Easiest route: snow/ice climb

Siguang Ri is a mountain in the Mahalangur Himalayas of Tibet, China. At an elevation of 7,308 m (23,976 ft), it is the 82nd highest peak on Earth. It is located approximately 6 km (3.7 mi) NNE of Cho Oyu, the world's 6th highest mountain.

Siguang Ri has two significant subpeaks:

Siguang Ri Shar 28°09′N 86°43′E (6998m, Prominence = 398m)
Siguang Ri Northwest 28°10′N 86°39′E (6840m, Prominence = 340m)
