= Malchin Peak =

Mountain in Central Asia

- Location within Mongolia

Highest point
- Elevation: 4,050 m (13,290 ft)
- Parent peak: Khüiten Peak
- Coordinates: 49°10′17″N 87°52′32″E

Geography
- Location: Bayan-Ölgii, Mongolia
- Parent range: Tavan Bogd; Mongol Altai Mountains

Malchin Peak (Mongolian: Малчин оргил [ˈmaɬtɕʰɪ̆ɴ ˈœɾɞ̆ɟɪɬ]; lit. 'Herder Peak') is the one of five peaks of the Tavan Bogd mountain on the Mongolia–Russia border. The Peak towers at the elevation of 4,050 m (13,287 ft). It is the only one of the five peaks of Tavan Bogd that can be climbed without specialized mountain climbing equipment.

== See also ==
- Khüiten Peak
- Nairamdal Peak
