= Yunlong Mountain =

Mountain in Xuzhou, China

Coordinates: 26.2570°N 115.4575°E

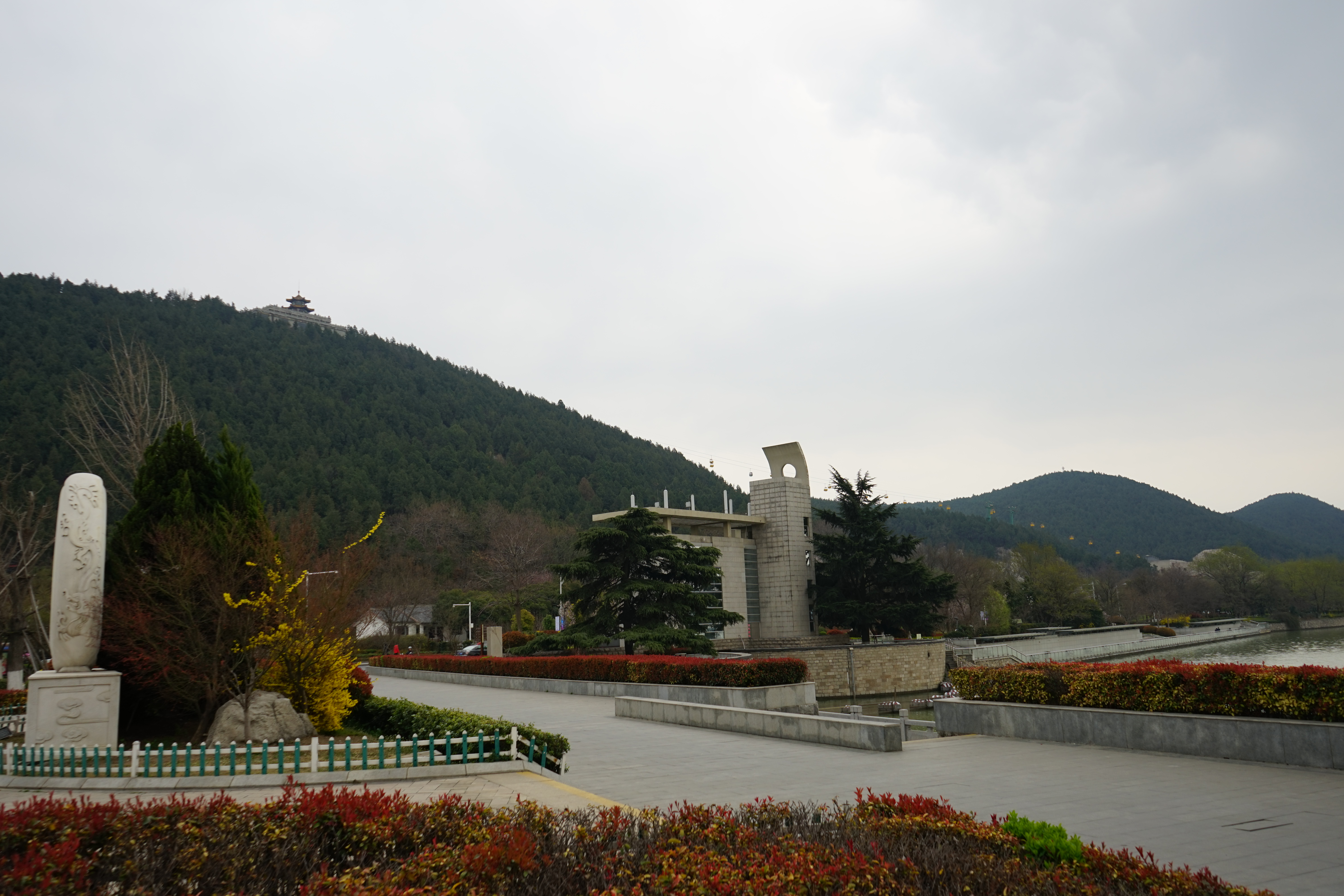
Yunlong Mountain

Yunlong Mountain (云龙山), located in southern Xuzhou, with an elevation of 142 m (466 ft), is the second tallest mountain in Xuzhou (Dadong Mountain (大洞山) coming first). Forests on the mountain cover an area of 509,944 square metres (5,488,990 sq ft). The forest coverage of Yunlong Mountain is 97.9 percent. The dense tree coverage attracts tourists, who enjoy the view of clouds surrounding the peaks all year round. With its nine dragon-like peaks, from southeast to northwest, it is like a giant dragon being overlooked, from which it got its name 'Yunlong'.

== Historical attractions ==
=== The Giant Scholar Rock (大士岩) ===
It is a big rock with many stone inscriptions on or near it. According to the historical record, Su Shi, one of the administration officials of Xuzhou in the Song dynasty, once climbed Yunlong Mountain but got tired when he passed Huangmao Gang (黄茅冈), so he slept on a big rock. When he woke up, he wrote a poem to express his feeling after waking up in the air. Since then, the rock he slept on has been called Giant Scholar Rock or Stone Bed of Dongpo (东坡石床).

=== The Crane-flying pavilion (放鹤亭) ===
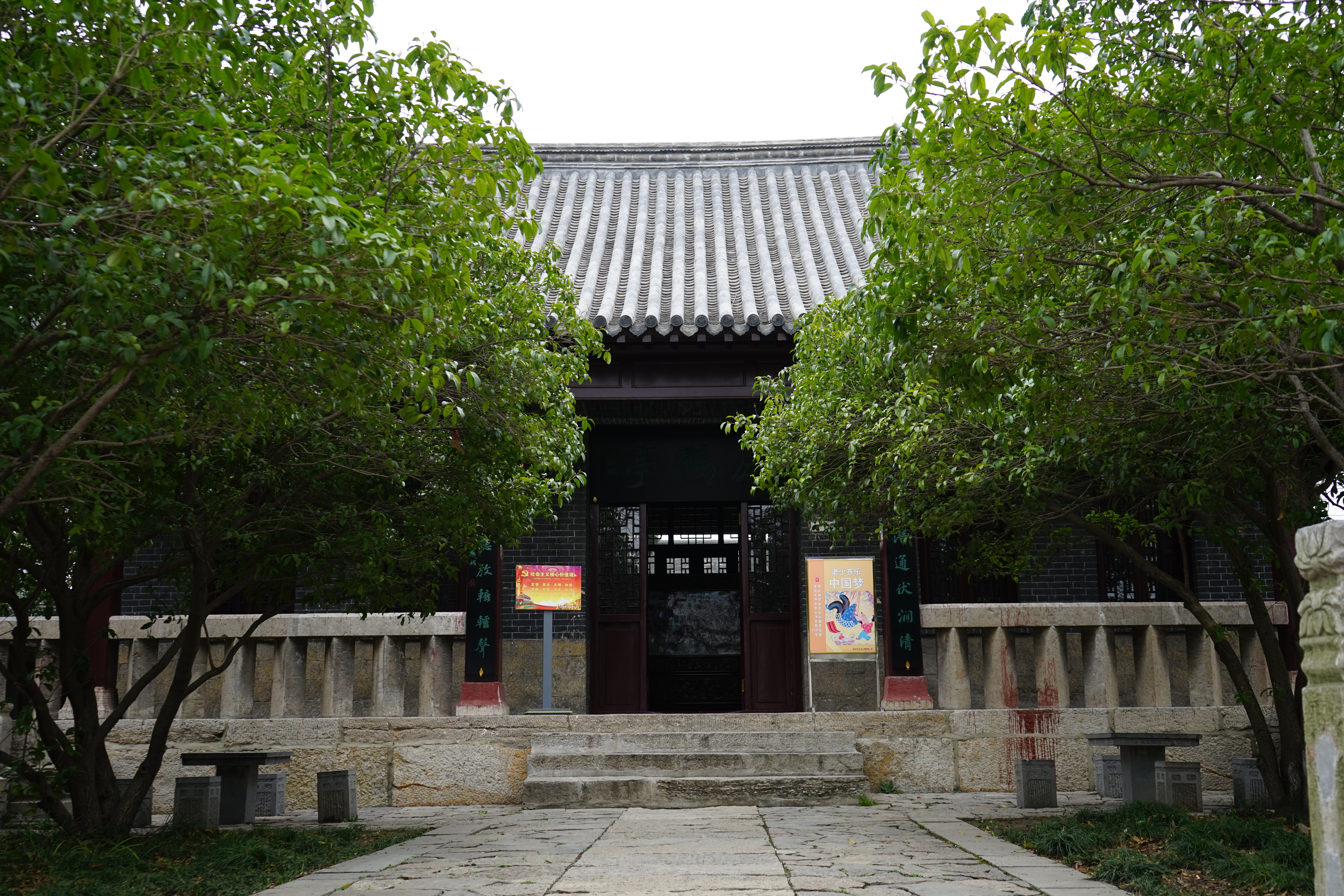
Crane Flying Pavilion

Crane–flying pavilion is on the platform at the top of Yunlong Mountain. It was built in the Song dynasty by Zhang Tianji (张天骥). It extends 11.95 metres (39.2 ft) in length and 4.95 metres (16.2 ft) in width. Su Shi often drank with Zhang at the Crane-flying Pavilion. Su wrote “Record of the Crane-flying Pavilion” (放鹤亭记) to be in memory of the building procedure and the comfort he got when he was in the pavilion. The Crane-flying Pavilion was rebuilt many times after the original one collapsed, especially in Ming and Qing dynasty and after the 1911 Revolution. To the south of the Crane-flying Pavilion, is the Crane-coming Pavilion (招鹤亭) in front of which is the Crane-drinking Spring (饮鹤泉).

=== Xinghua Temple (兴化寺) ===
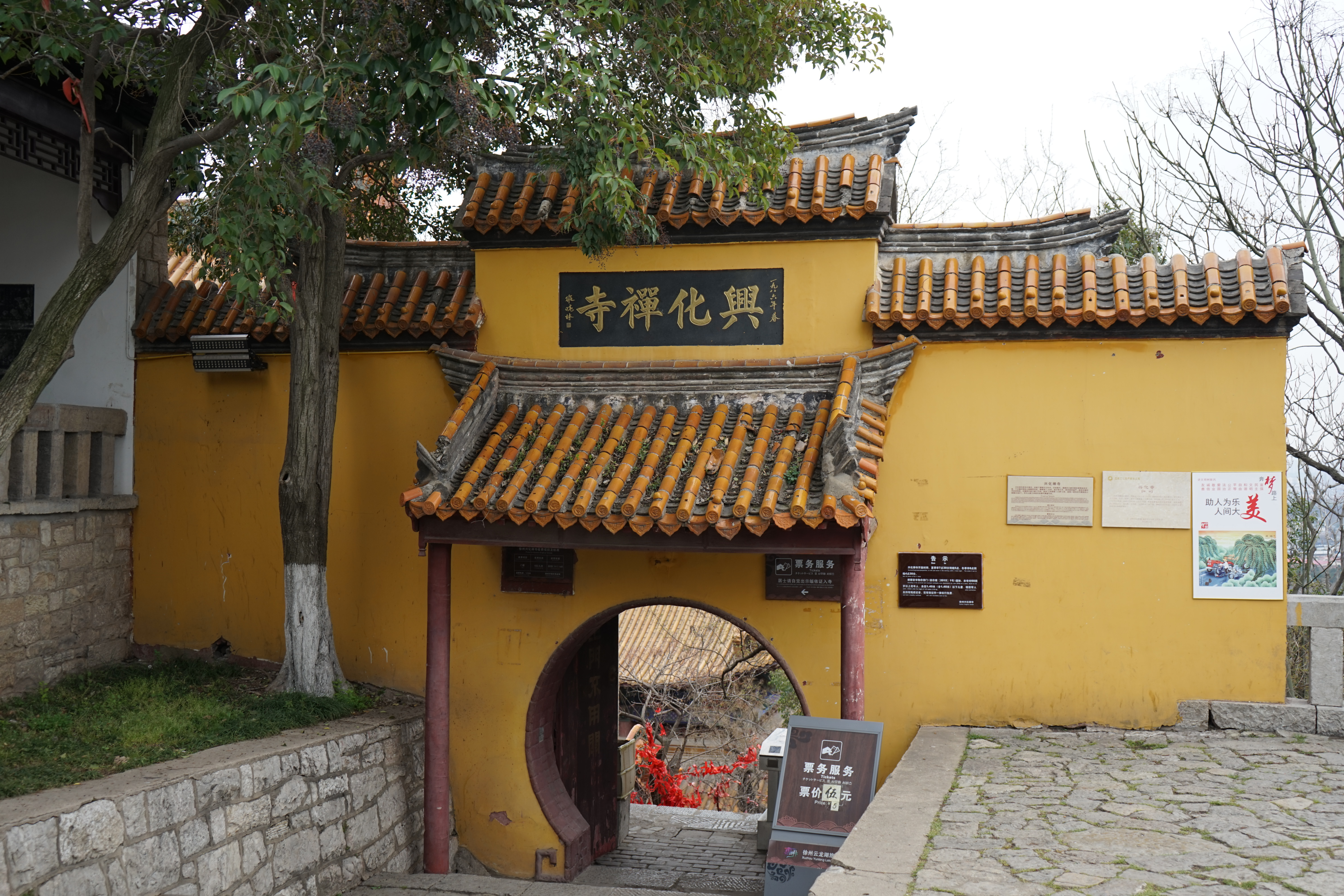
entrance of Xinghua Temple

Covering an area of 7,000 square metres (75,000 sq ft), the temple is one of the capitals of Buddhism in North Jiangsu. By climbing to the top of the mountain and going down the east slope, you will see Xinghua Temple. To protect a 10-metre (33 ft) tall stone Buddha, carved in the North Wei dynasty, Xinghua Temple was built by the cliff in the Ming dynasty to cover the big statue. What surprises people is that the palace covering the statue is based on only three layers of brick, but the bricks successfully hold the huge palace.

When Xinghua Temple was rebuilt in 1993, 195 Buddhism statues made in the Tang and Song dynasty were found, which greatly contributed to research into Chinese Buddhism. And in 1995, Xinghua Temple was listed in the Provincial Culture Relics Protection Units in Jiangsu.

This is the link for Trip advisor. https://share.google/y35xyfNSIS0Rzcs6c
