= Qianling Mountain =

Mountain in Guiyang, Guizhou, China

Coordinates: 26°37′02″N 106°41′47″E

- Type: Tourism
- Location: Northwest of Guiyang

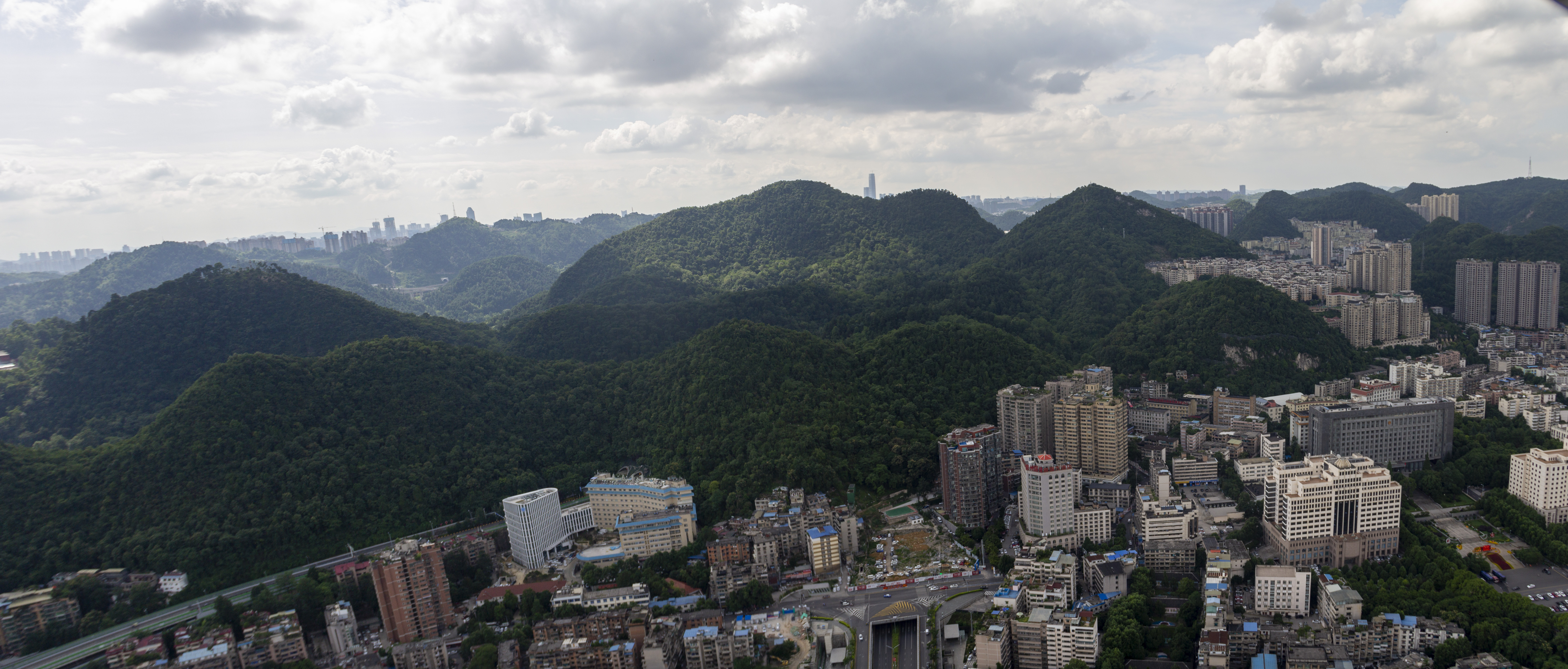
Qianling Mountain

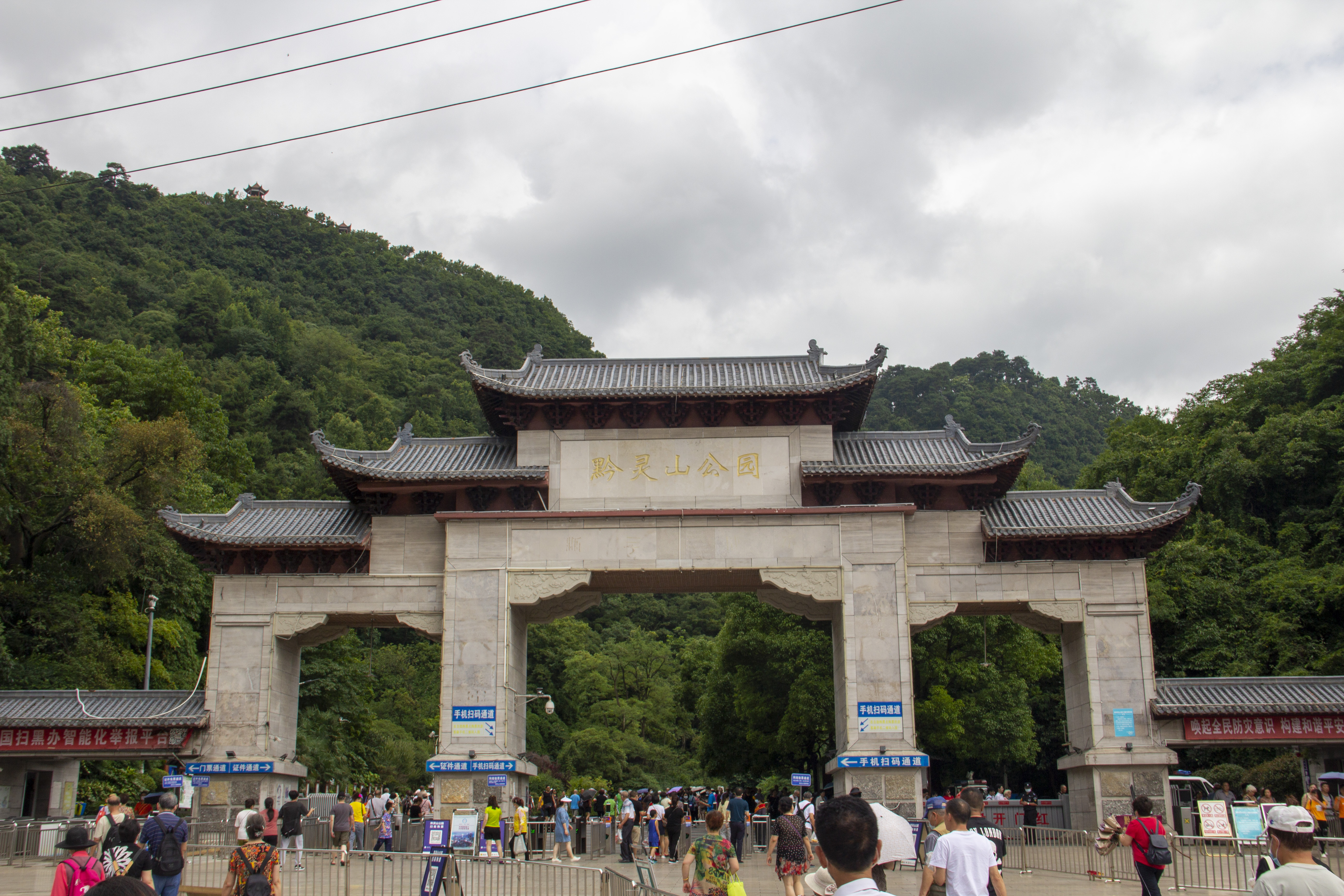
South Gate of Qianling Mountain Park

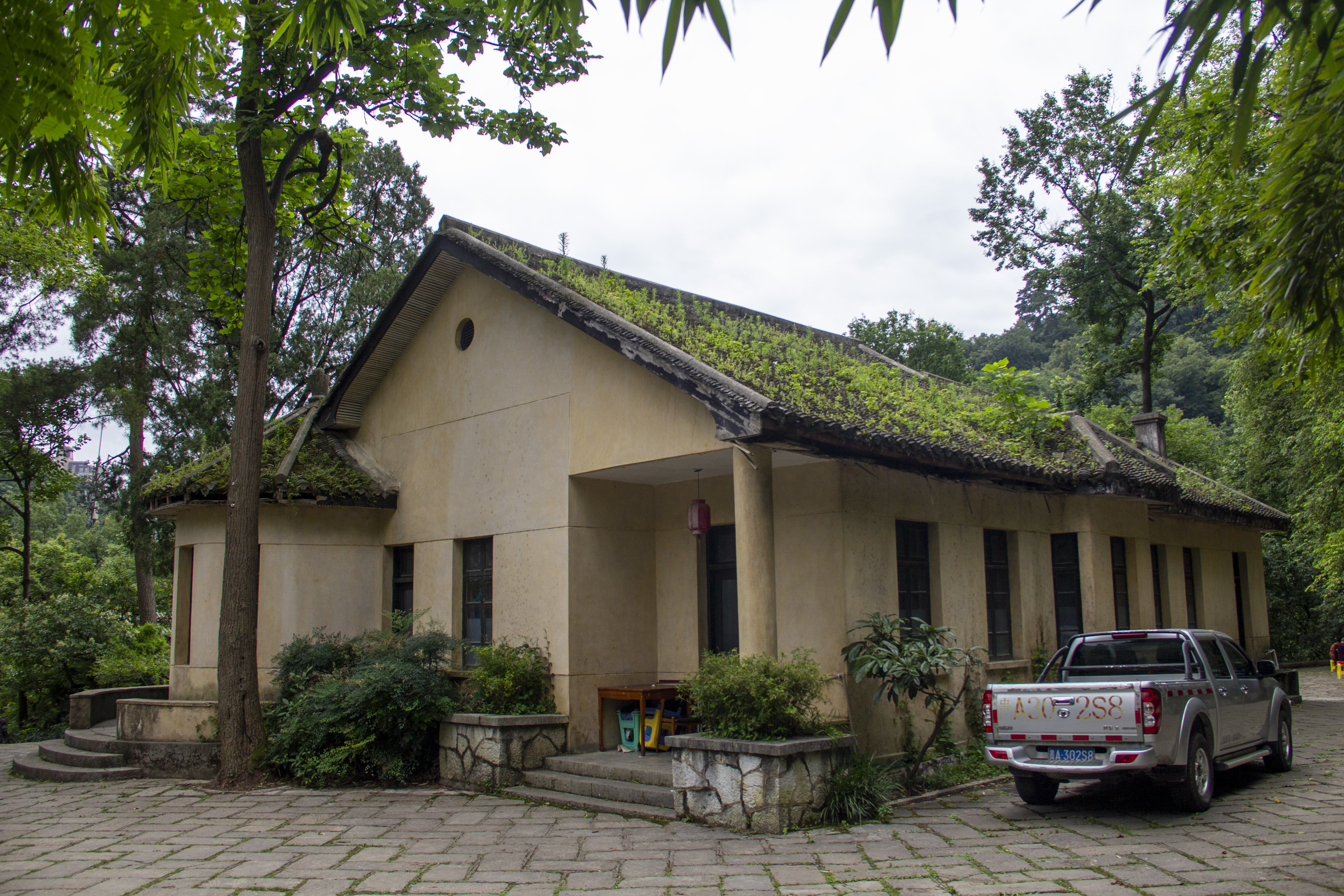
Chiang Kai-shek and Zhang Xueliang's meeting place

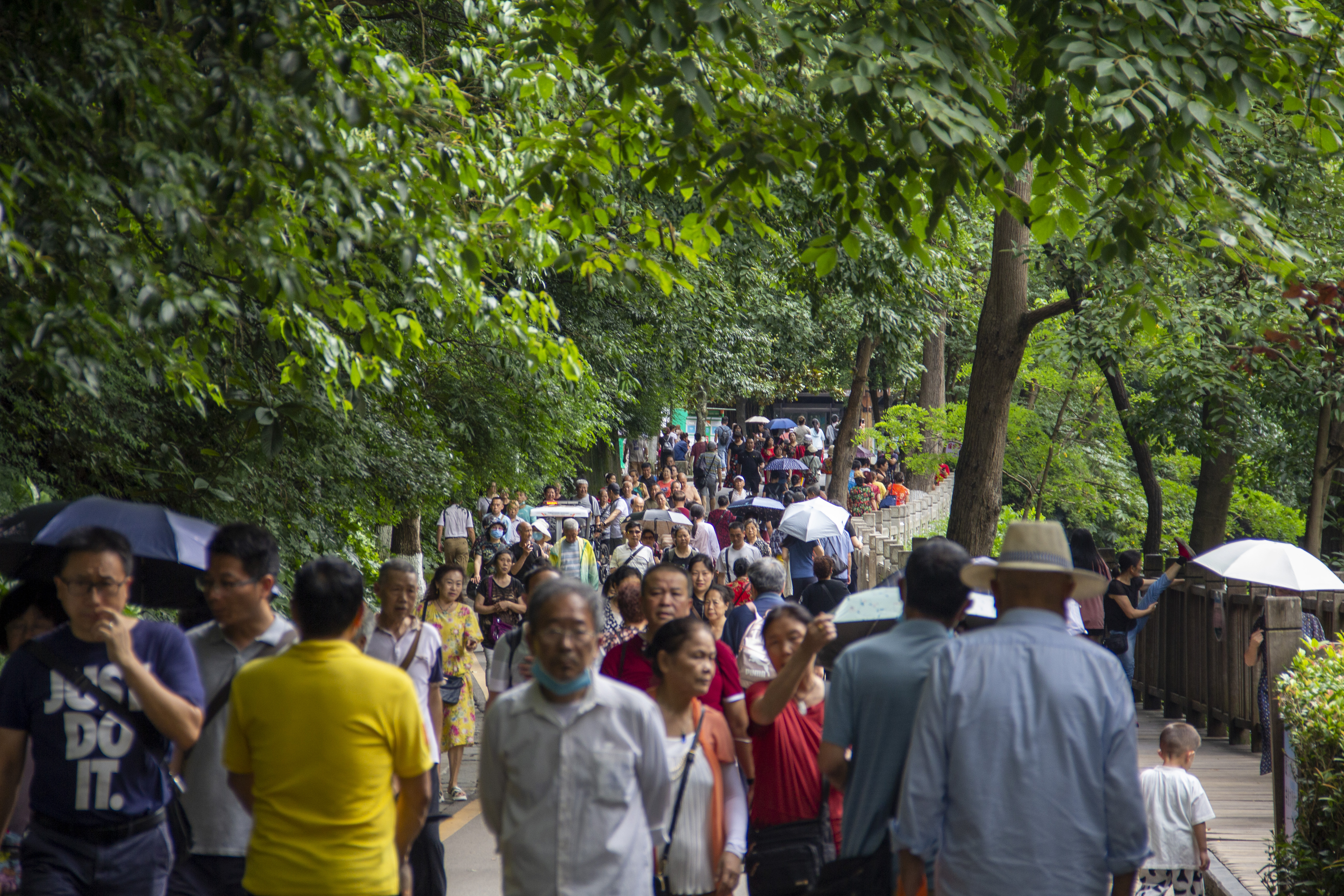
Tourists at Qianling Mountain

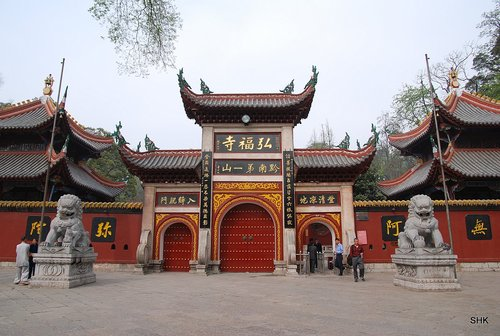
The Hongfu temple

Qianling Mountain (Chinese: 黔灵山; pinyin: Qiánlíng Shān) is an inner-city mountain located at Guiyang, Guizhou, China. The mountain's name refers to Qian, which is the short name of Guizhou province. As an inner-city mountain, its attractions include a temperate forest and a lake.

== Mountains ==
The list of mountains included Zhangti, Baota, Tiyu, Santai, Shiyu, Xiangwang, Daluo, and Tanshan. The Daluo mountain is the highest among them, with an elevation of 1500 m.

== History ==
The first Buddhist temple was built in 1672 by the 33rd generation of the Linji Buddhist Chisong monk. The temple is named Hongfu temple, which in Chinese means the massiveness of Buddha's blessing. The temple is visited by thousands of tourists and worshipers daily.

== Attractions ==
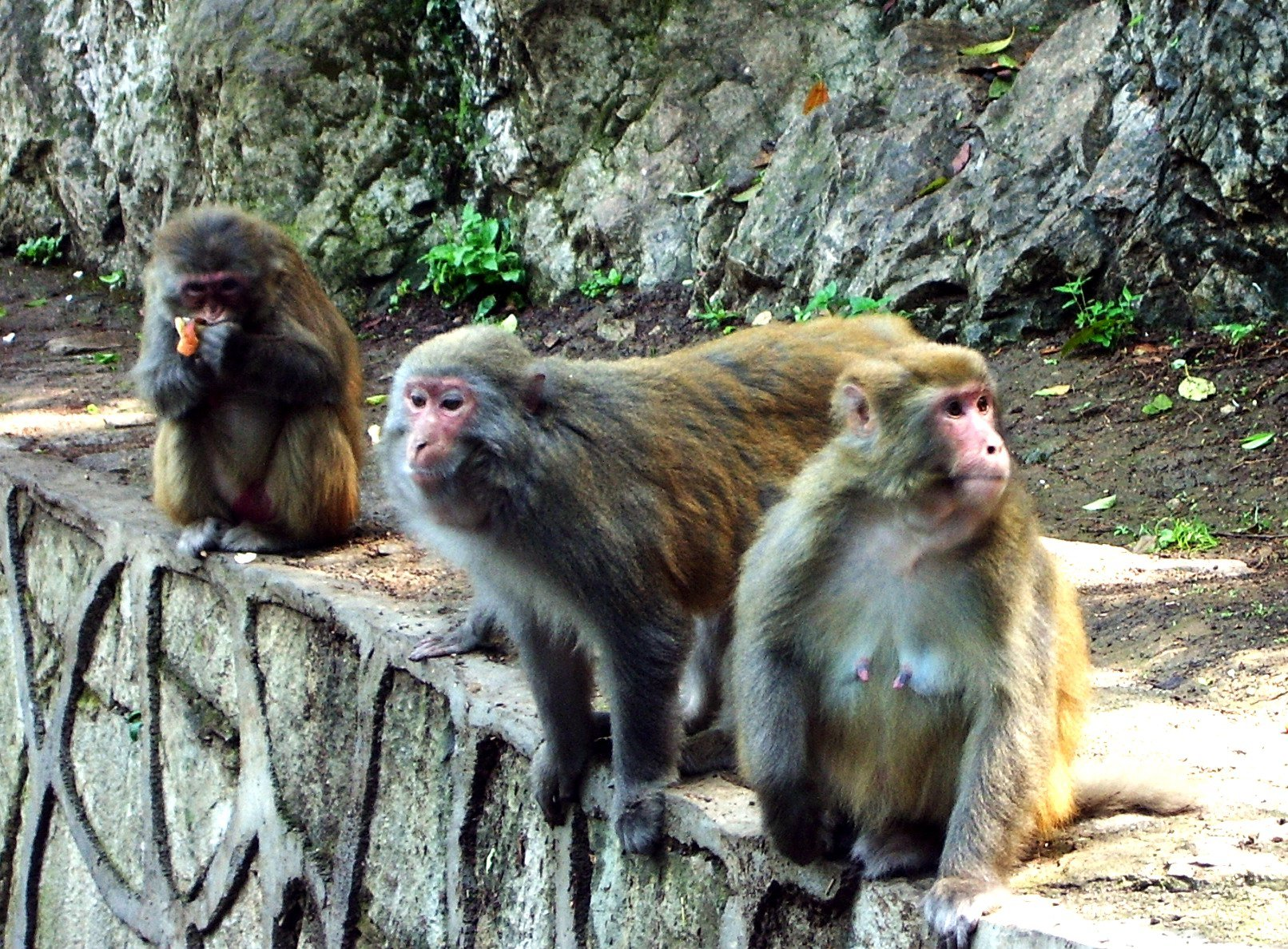
Monkeys on the side of the walkway

- "9 turn" hike to the Hongfu temple
- Hongfu temple
- Mountain top view of the Guiyang city
- Qianling zoo
- Kylin cave
- Qianling Lake
- Monkey park
