= Tavan Bogd =

Mongolian mountain

Tabhan Bogd ᠲᠠᠪᠤᠨ ᠪᠣᠭᠳᠠ
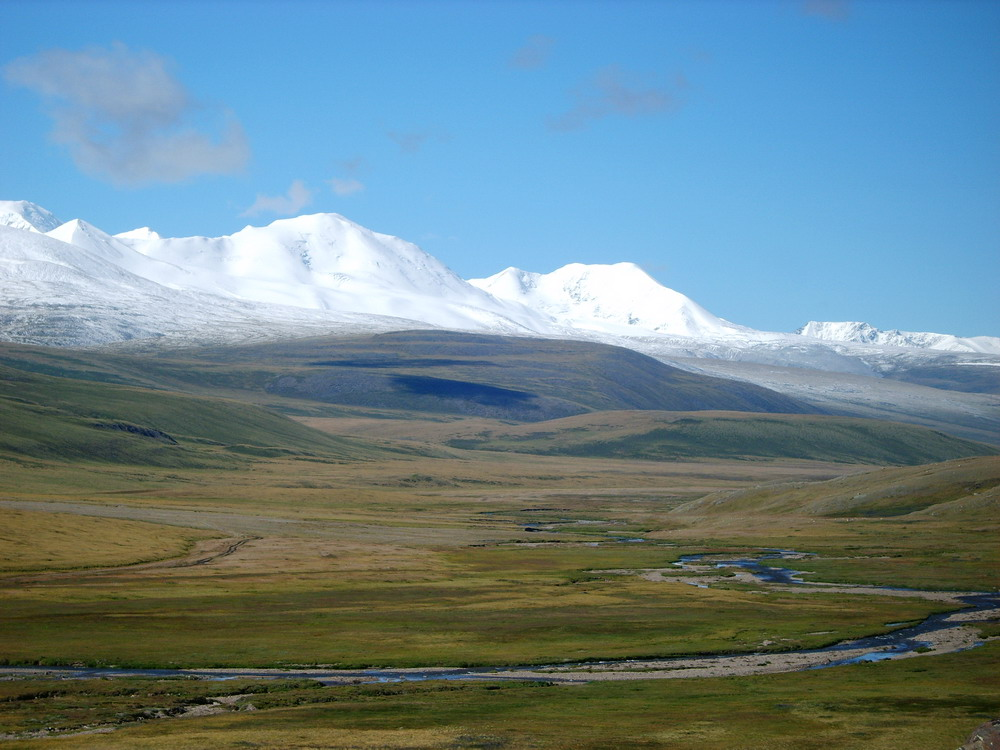
- A view of Tabhan Bogd from the Altai Republic.

Highest point
- Elevation: 4,374 m (14,350 ft)
- Prominence: 2,342 m (7,684 ft)
- Listing: Ultra
- Coordinates: 49°8′45″N 87°49′9″E

Naming
- Pronunciation: [ˈtʰaw̜əɴ ˈpɔxt]

Geography
- Location within Mongolia
- Location: Ulaankhus soum and Tsengel soum, Bayan-Ölgii Province, Mongolia
- Parent range: Mongol-Altai Mountains

Climbing
- First ascent: 1956
- Easiest route: Hiking

UNESCO World Heritage Site
- Official name: Petroglyphic Complexes of the Mongolian Altai
- Type: Cultural
- Criteria: iii
- Designated: 2011 (35th session)
- Reference no.: 1382
- Region: Asia

The Five Saints, known in Mongolian as the Tabhan Bogd (/ˈtævən bɒɡd/; Таван богд [ˈtʰaw̜əɴ pɔxt]), is a mountain massif in Mongolia, near the triple border with China and Russia. Its highest peak, the Khüiten Peak (formerly also known as Nairamdal Peak), is the highest point of Mongolia at 4374 meters above sea level.

The Tavan Bogd massif is located mostly within the Bayan-Ölgii Province of Mongolia; its northern slopes are in Russia's Altai Republic, and western, in China's Burqin County.

Besides the Khüiten Peak, the Tavan Bogd massif includes four other peaks: Nairamdal, Malchin, Bürged (eagle) and Ölgii (motherland).

== International borders ==
According to the relevant trilateral agreements and published topographic maps, the junction point of the China–Russia border, the China–Mongolia border, and the Mongolia–Russia border is the top of a peak with the elevation of 4081 or 4104 m, at the coordinates 49°10′13.5″N 87°48′56.3″E The mountain peak is referred to in the agreements and maps as the Tavan Bogd Peak (Russian: Таван-Богдо-Ула, Tavan-Bogdo-Ula; Mongolian: Таван Богд Уул, Tavan Bogd Uul), or Mount Kuitun (Chinese: 奎屯山; pinyin: Kuítún shān).

Due to its remote and hard to access location, on a mountain covered with perpetual snows, the three states have agreed not to install a border marker at the tripoint.

Other sources claim that the tripoint is called Nairamdal Peak, but this is not confirmed either by official agreements or by maps.

Some other peaks of the Tavan Bogd massif are located on the China–Mongolia border or the Mongolia–Russia border. In particular, the massif tallest point, the Khüiten Peak, is located on the China–Mongolia border, about 2.5 km south of the tripoint. In the past, it was known as the "Friendship Peak" (Nairamdal Uul in Mongolian, or Youyi Feng 友谊峰 in Chinese).

== Peaks ==
The main peaks of the Tavanbogd massif are:

Name	Height (metres)
Khüiten Peak	4,374
Nairamdal Peak	4,180
Bürged Peak	4,068
Malchin Peak	4,050
Olgii Peak	4,050

== Glaciation ==
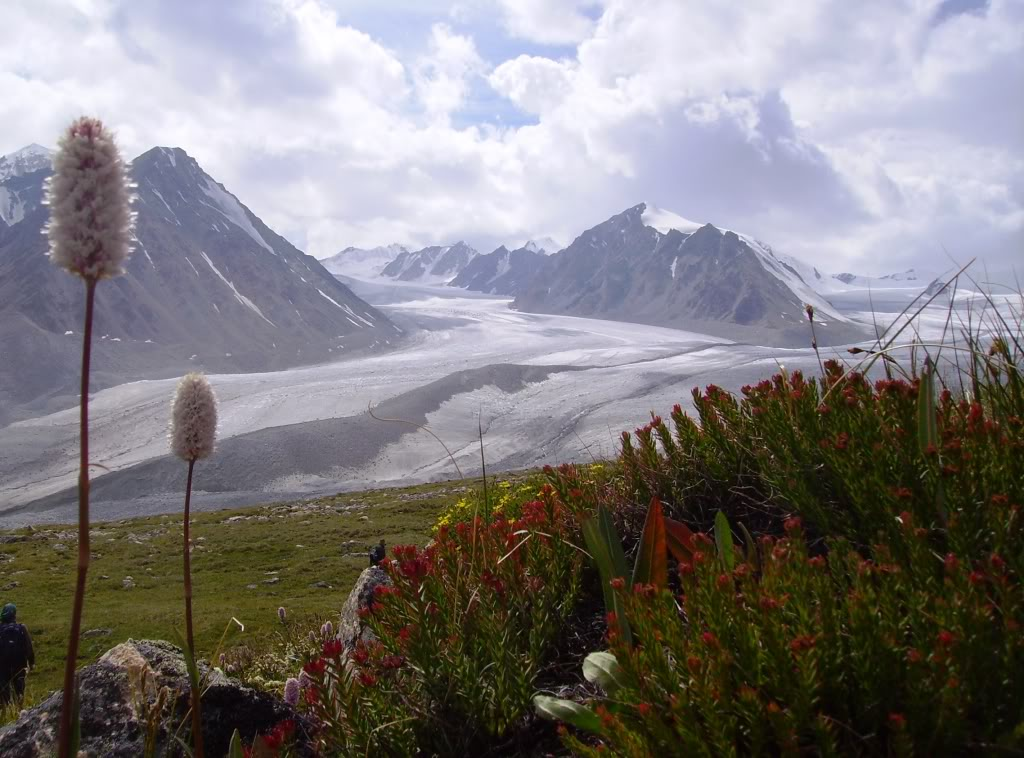
The Tavan Bogd Mountains and glaciers

According to satellite measurements, the total area of the glaciation in the Tavan Bogd massif area amounted to 204 km^{2} in 2009. The glaciates area was 213 km^{2} in 1989; in other words, the glaciers lost 4.2% of their area over those 20 years.

Out of the countries that share the massif, the largest glaciated area is in Mongolia; it includes the Potanin Glacier (Mongolia's longest) and the Alexandra Glacier.

According to a 2011 estimate, the northern (Russian) slope of the Tavan Bogd massif contains 12 glaciers, which cover the total of 22.8 km^{2}. According to the Russian researchers, the glaciers of the massif's northern slope lost 11% of their area between 1962 and 2002, and another 12% in 2002–2009.

== National Parks and protected areas ==
Special protected areas have been designated in all three nations sharing the Tavan Bogd.

The Mongolian part of the Tavan Bogd massif is within the Altai Tavan Bogd National Park. The park covers 6,362 km^{2}. It includes the lakes Khoton, Khurgan, and Dayan. The protected area offers a home for many species of alpine animal, such as the Argali sheep, Ibex, Red deer, Beech marten, Moose, Snow cock, and Golden eagle.

On the Russian side of the border, the Ukok Plateau, adjacent to the Tavan Bogd massif from the north, is part of the UNESCO World Heritage Site called the Golden Mountains of Altai.

The glacier-fed stream on the western, Chinese, slope of the massif flow into the small Akkul Lake (阿克库勒湖), which in its turn drains into the Kanas Lake farther south; the Kanas Lake area has been designated AAAAA scenic area by the China National Tourism Administration. An area of 5,588 km^{2} has been designated as the Kanas Nature Reserve (zh:喀纳斯湖自然风景保护区).

== See also ==
- List of mountains in Mongolia

== Bibliography ==
- Chistyakov, K. V.; Ganiushkin, D. A. (2015), "Glaciation and Thermokarst Phenomena and Natural Disasters in the Mountains of North-West Inner Asia", in Culshaw, Martin; Osipov, Victor; Booth, S.J.; et al. (eds.), Environmental Security of the European Cross-Border Energy Supply Infrastructure NATO Science for Peace and Security Series C: Environmental Security, Springer, pp. 207–218, ISBN 940179538X
- Krumwiede, Brandon S.; Kamp, Ulrich; Leonard, Gregory J.; Kargel, Jeffrey S.; Dashtseren, Avirmed; Walther, Michael (2014), "Recent Glacier Changes in the Mongolian Altai Mountains: Case Studies from Munkh Khairkhan and Tavan Bogd", in Kargel, Jeffrey Stuart (ed.), Global Land Ice Measurements from Space, Springer-Praxis series in geophysics, Springer, pp. 481–509, ISBN 3540798188
