= Potanin Glacier =

Glacier in Mongolia

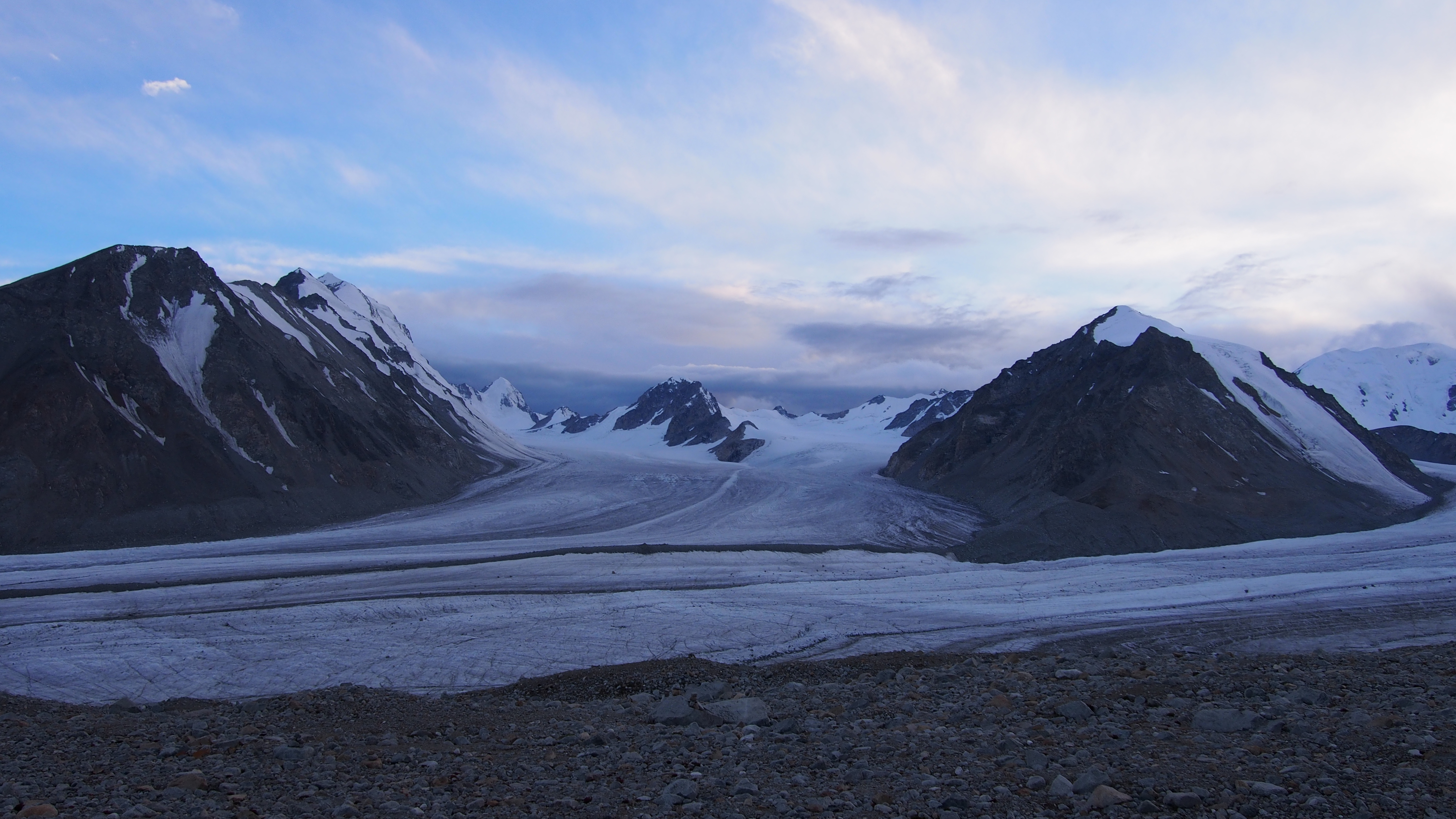

- Location within Mongolia
- Type: Mountain glacier
- Location: Ulaankhus District, Bayan-Ölgii Province, Mongolia
- Coordinates: 49°08′24″N 87°55′12″E

The Potanin Glacier (Mongolian: Потанины мөсөн гол) is the longest glacier in Mongolia, it stretches about 14 kilometres and located through in the Altai Tavan Bogd mountain in Altai Mountains. The glacier is named after explorer Grigory Potanin.

As with many other glaciers around the world, the Potanin Glacier is gradually decreasing in size. Over a 6-year period of observation, September 2003 to September 2009, it retreated by about 90 meters, thus recording an average retreat rate of 15 m/year. It also has become thinner, especially in its lower parts; the average thinning rate of 2.6 m/year has been measured over 2004–2009.

== Sources ==
- Krumwiede, Brandon S.; Kamp, Ulrich; Leonard, Gregory J.; Kargel, Jeffrey S.; Dashtseren, Avirmed; Walther, Michael (2014), "Recent Glacier Changes in the Mongolian Altai Mountains: Case Studies from Munkh Khairkhan and Tavan Bogd", in Kargel, Jeffrey Stuart (ed.), Global Land Ice Measurements from Space, Springer-Praxis series in geophysics, Springer, pp. 481–509, ISBN 3540798188
