= Mount Chishi =

Mountain in China

- 叱石山
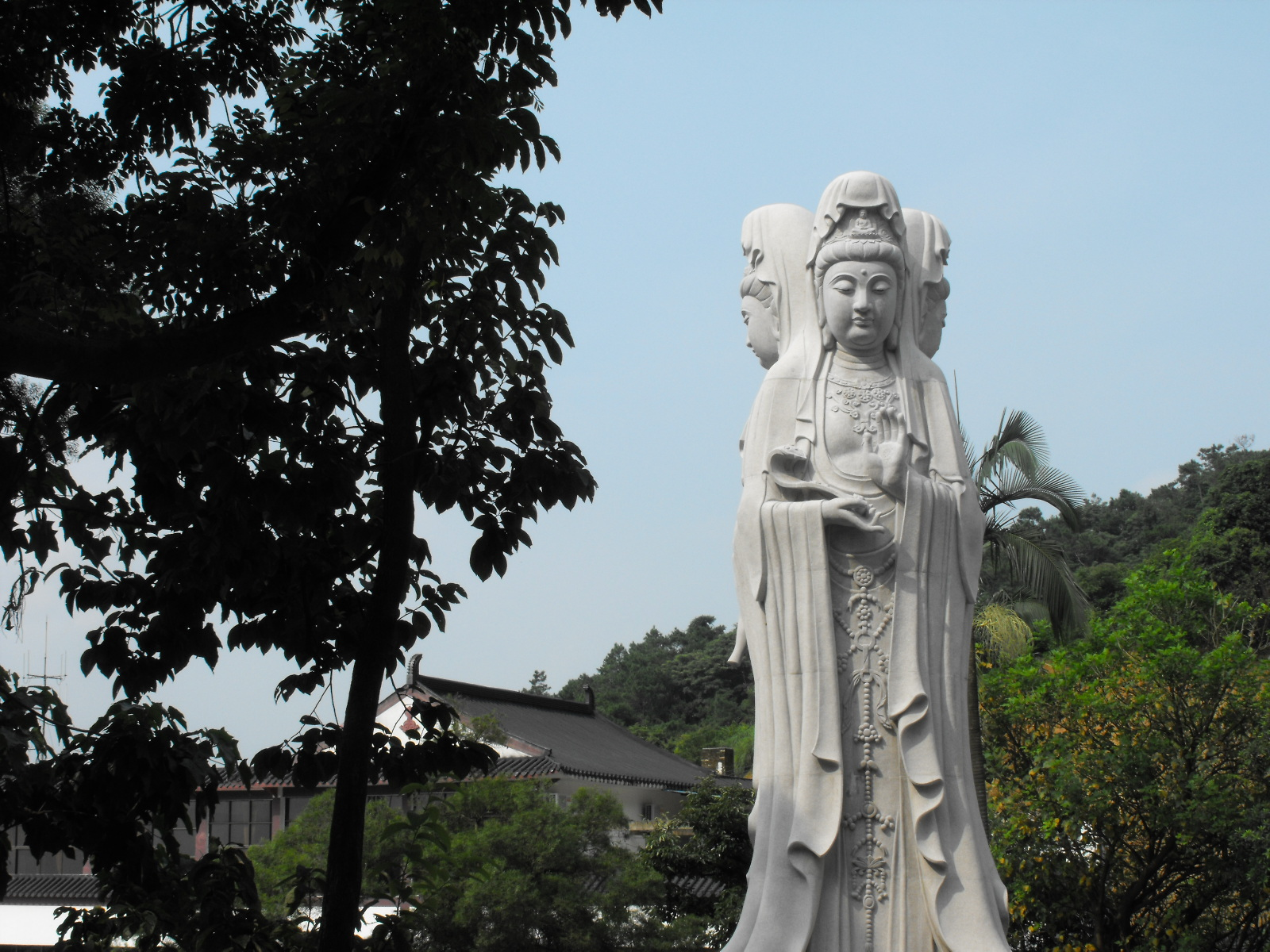
- Statue of Guanyin on the top of Mount Chishi.

Highest point
- Elevation: 380 m (1,250 ft)
- Prominence: 380 m (1,250 ft)
- Coordinates: 22°34′46″N 113°00′54″E

Geography
- Location within Guangdong
- Country: China
- Province: Guangdong
- Parent range: Guifeng Mountain

Geology
- Rock type: Granite

Mount Chishi (Chinese: 叱石山; pinyin: Chìshí Shān) is a mountain located in Duruan Town, Pengjiang District of Jiangmen, Guangdong, China, with a height of 380 metres (1,250 ft) above sea level.

== Name ==
The name of Mount Chishi is cited from the Chinese idiom "叱石成羊", meaning mysterious things. It was named by the Great Minister of War of Ming dynasty (1368-1644) Huang Gongfu (黄公辅) when he climbed the mountain.

== Attractions ==
- Yangshikeng (羊石坑): Edmund Ho, presented 38 stone statues of goat to the local government.
- Guanyin Cliff (观音岩): A cliff is engraved with Guanyin.
- Guanyin Temple (观音寺): A Buddhist temple first built in the Qianlong period (1736-1795) of Qing dynasty (1644-1912).
- Hall of Magnolia liliflora (木兰堂): A hall with a 1000-year-old Magnolia liliflora.
- Duquan Pavilion (读泉亭): A pavilion located under the waterfall and built by Zheng Ji (郑绩; 1813–1874), a native calligrapher and painter.
- Pavilion of the Prince: A pavilion built to commemorate the loyal ministers of the Southern Ming dynasty (1644-1683).

== Gallery ==
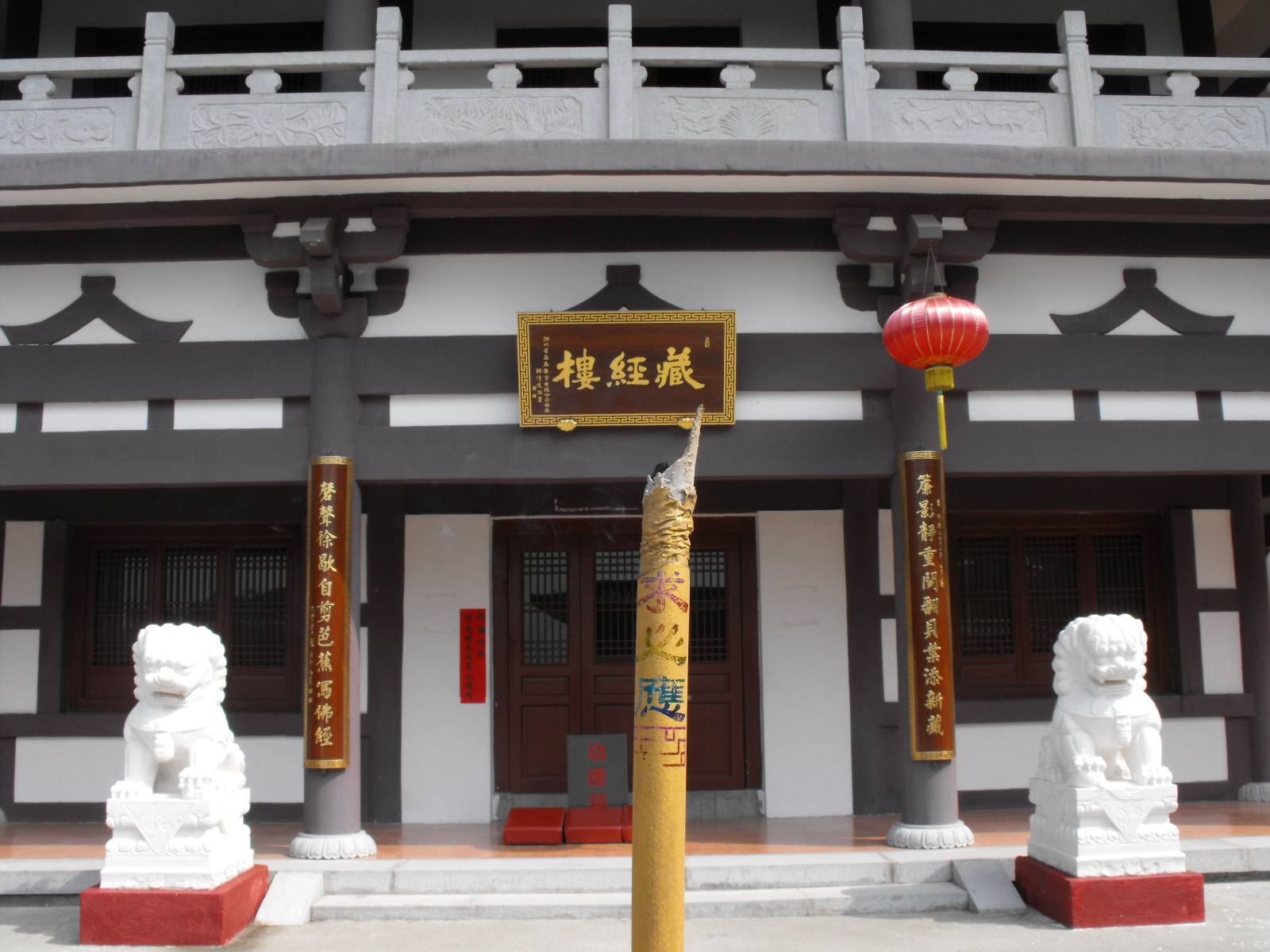
Buddhist Texts Library of Guanyin Temple.

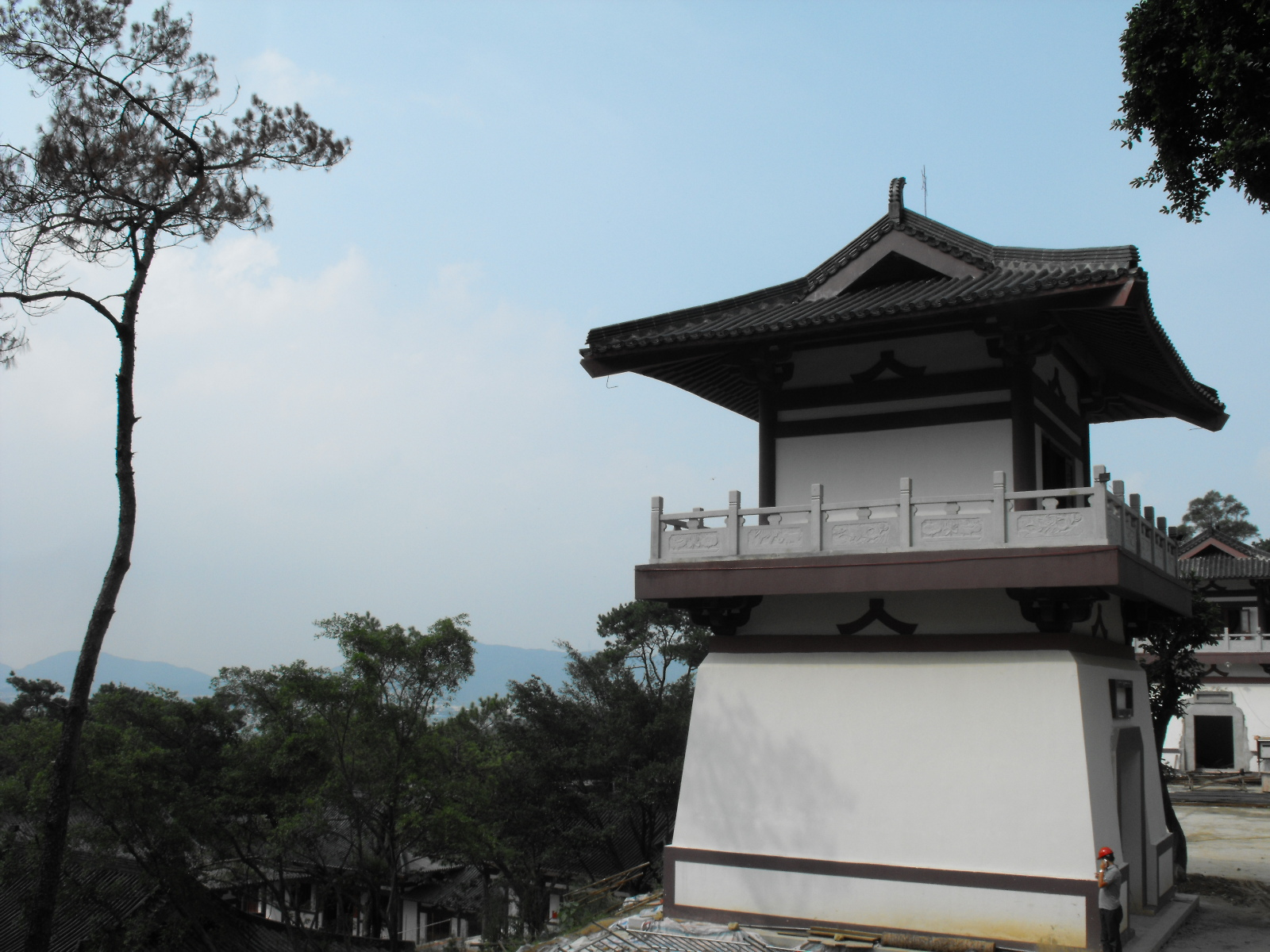
A pavilion at Guanyin Temple.
