= Yun Mountain =

Mountain in Hunan, China

Yun Mountain National Forest Park (Chinese: 云山国家森林公园) is located 5 kilometers (3.1 mi) from Wugang, a city in the southwest of Hunan Province, China. Its peak elevation is 1,372.5 meters (4,460 feet), and the annually average temperature there is 15 °C (59 °F). In September 1992, it was approved as a national forest park.

== History ==
The area has a long history, beginning in the Sui and Tang dynasties (around AC 500–800) when Buddhists settled there. From the Song to Ming dynasties, it had developed to be a center of Buddhism in Hunan, with a series of amazing temples housing more than 500 monks.

== Natural resources ==
The park possesses rich animal and plant resources. Within the 3,118 hectares (7,700 acres) vegetation area, there is an original secondary broadleaf forest of more than 200 hectares. In 1921 an Austrian botanist discovered more than 80 new plant species in Yun Mountain, including 20 species named by Yunshan. So far, it is known that there are 1,518 species of plants and 211 species of animals found in Yun Mountain, including 10 rare species of animals and plants under special protection.
