= Mount Pomiu =

Mountain in Sichuan, China

- Location within Sichuan

Highest point
- Elevation: 5,413 m (17,759 ft)
- Prominence: 604 m (1,982 ft)
- Coordinates: 31°06′49″N 102°50′38″E

Geography
- Location: Sichuan, China
- Parent range: Qionglai Mountains

Climbing
- First ascent: 1984

Mount Pomiu is a mountain in Sichuan province, South East China.

- The mountain is 5413 m (17,759 ft) high, and is also known as Celestial Peak, and is found in The Four Girls (Signuniang) Nature Reserve.
- The highest mountain in The Four Girls Nature Reserve is 'The Four Girls Mountain' (Mount Siguniang), which is 6,240–6,250 m tall.

== Notable ascents ==
- 1984 – First ascent by Allen Steck, and a companion.
- 1985 – Second ascent by Keith Brown, new route
- 2005 – South west ridge first ascent by Mr. Qiu Xiang and Liu Xinan
