= Nairamdal Peak =

Mountain between Russia, China and Mongolia

- Location within Dzungaria Location within Mongolia

Highest point
- Elevation: 4,082 m (13,392 ft)
- Parent peak: Khüiten Peak
- Coordinates: 49°10′3″N 87°48′44″E

Geography
- Location: Mongolia-Russia-China
- Parent range: Tavan Bogd; Mongol-Altai Mountains

Nairamdal Peak or Friendship Peak (Mongolian: Найрамдал оргил, romanized: Nairamdal orgil; Chinese: 奎屯峰; pinyin: Kuítún fēng) is the one of five peaks of the Tavan Bogd mountain and it marks the border tripoint between Russia, Mongolia, and China. The Peak towers at the elevation of 4,082 m (13,392 ft).

== See also ==
- Khüiten Peak
- Malchin Peak
- List of Altai mountains
