= Almaty =

Largest city in Kazakhstan

Almaty Алматы
- City of republican significance
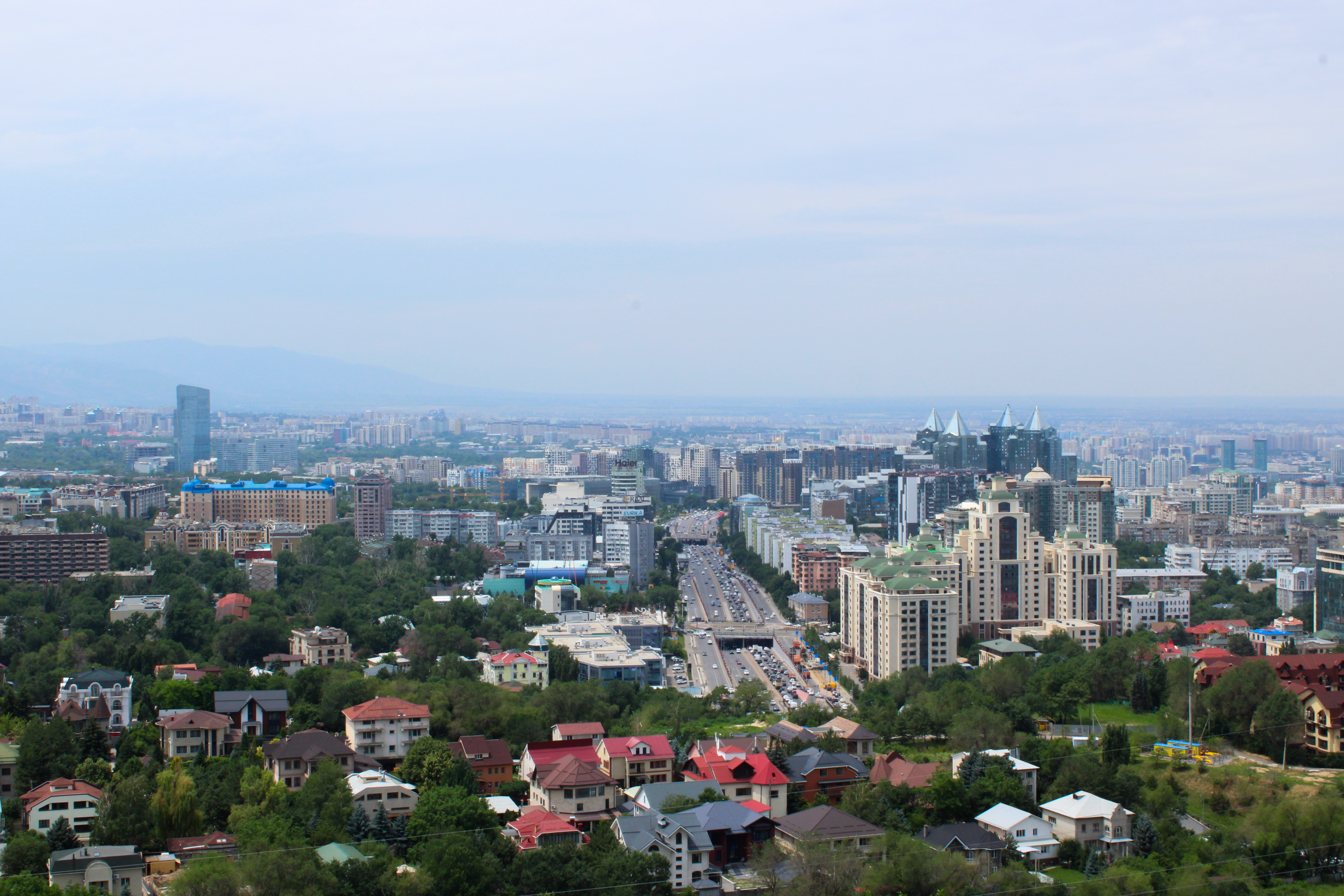
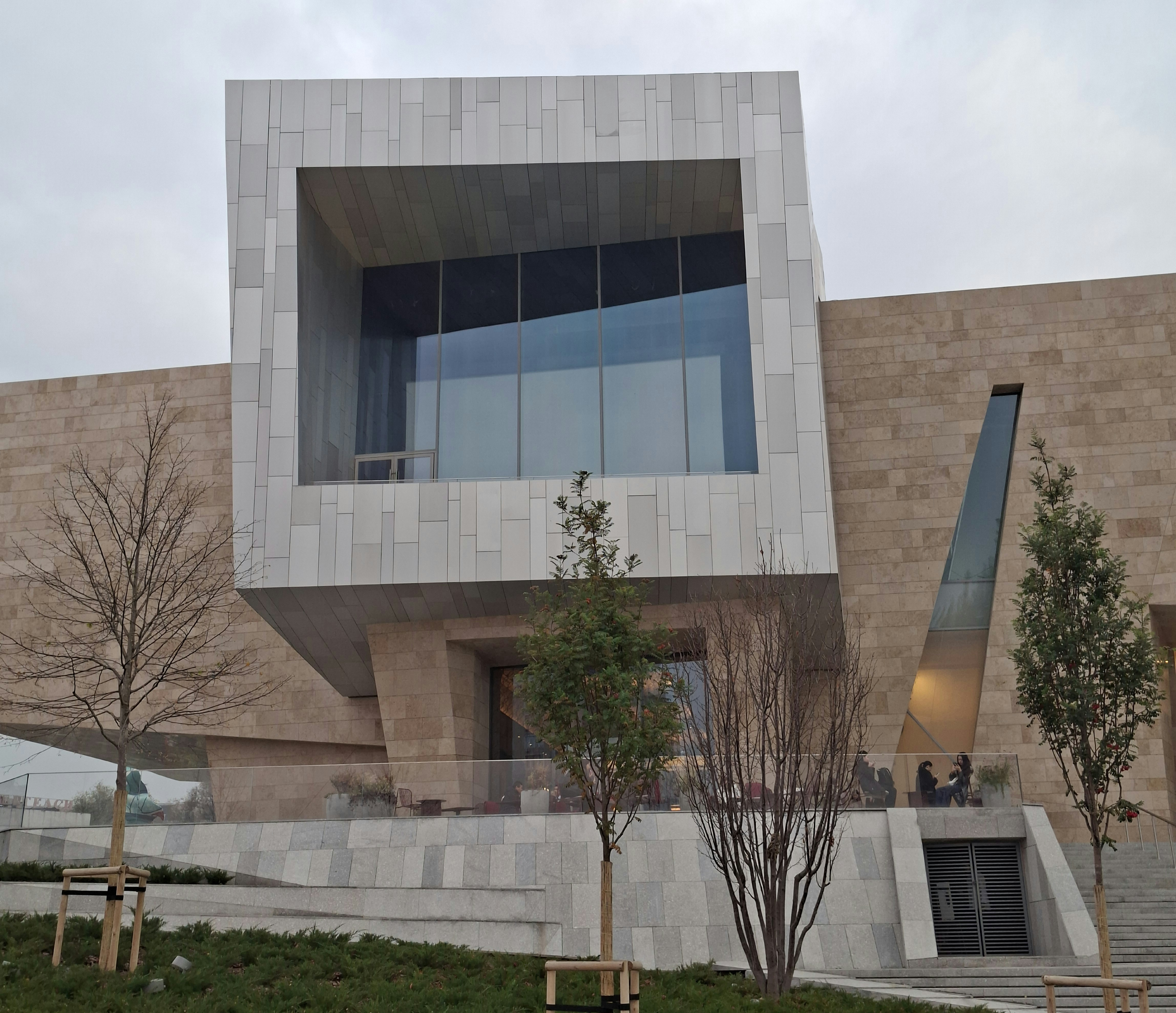
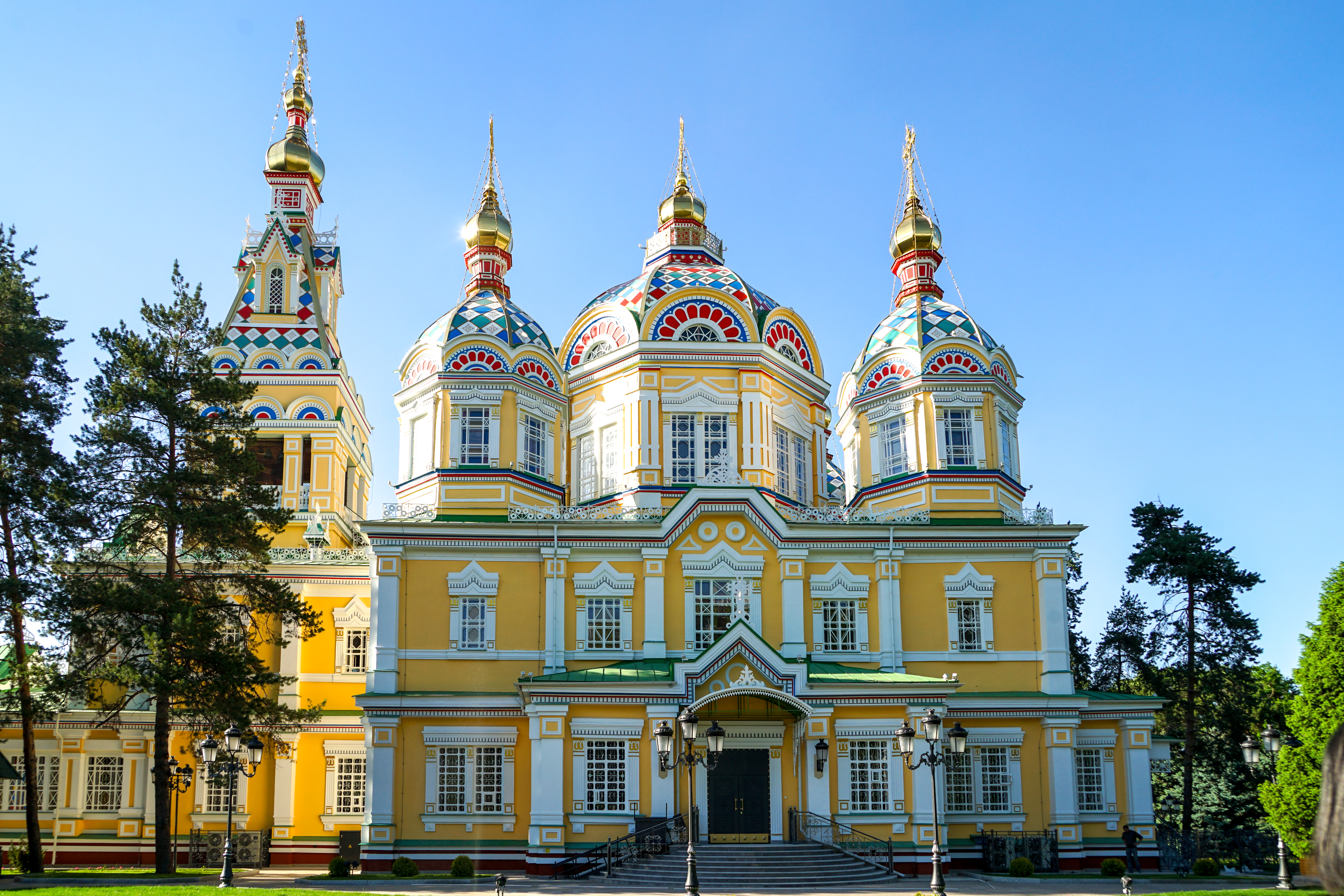
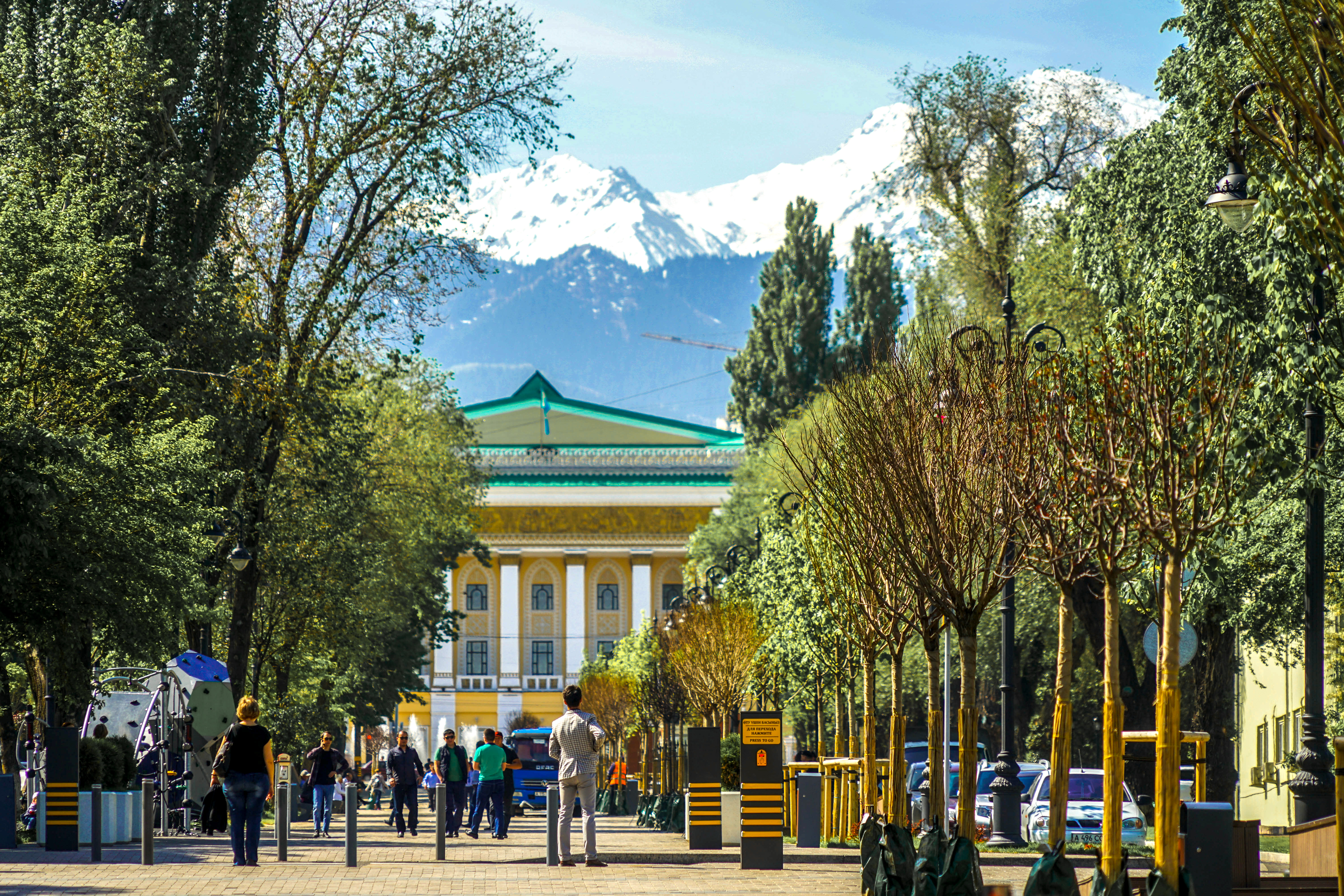
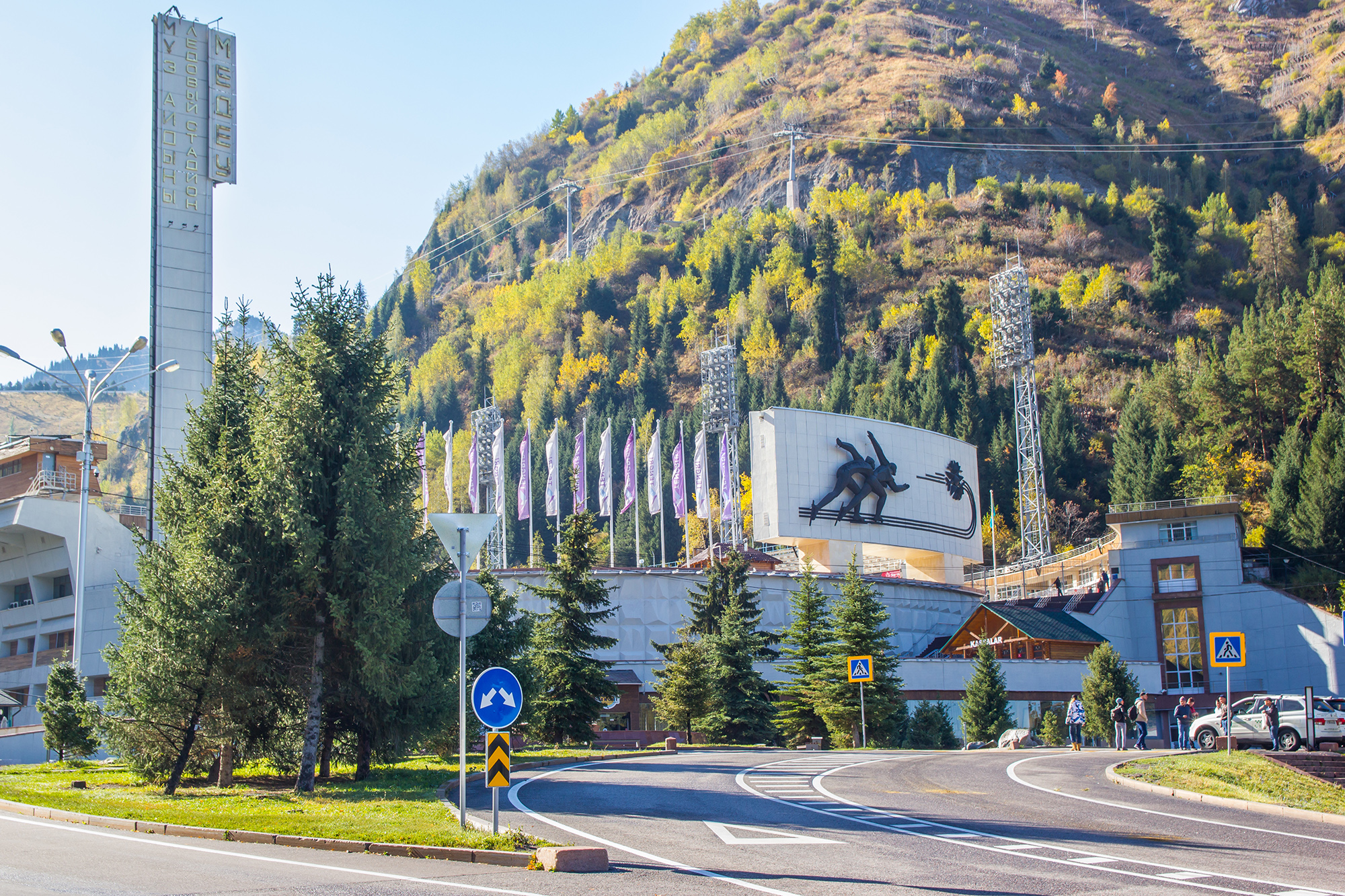
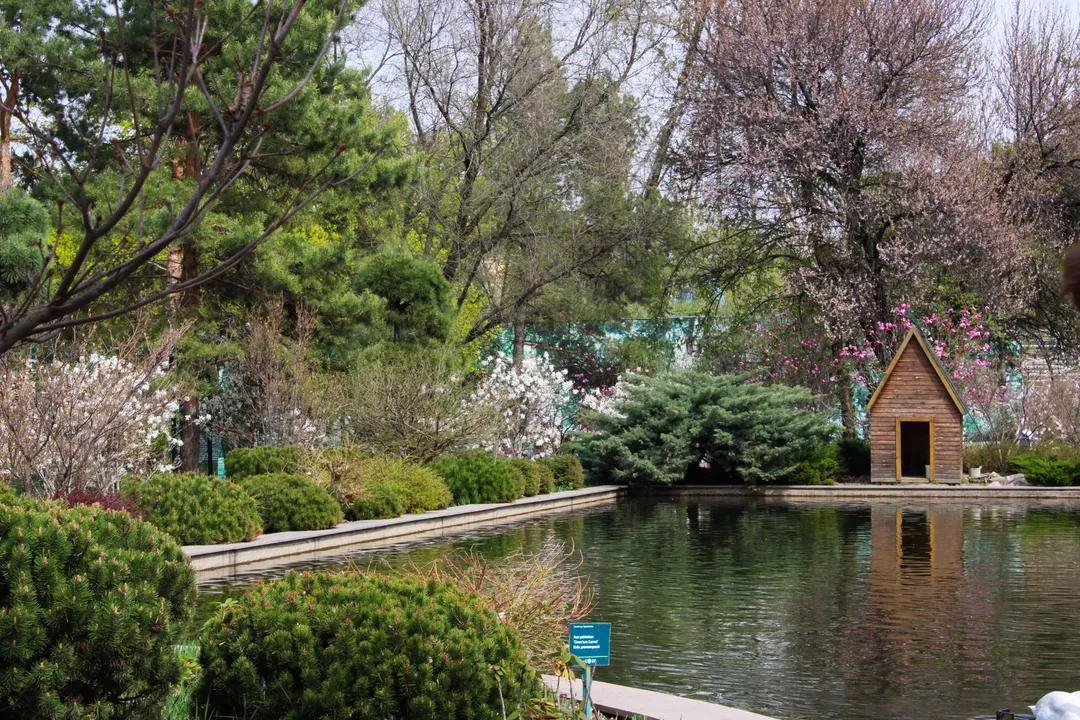
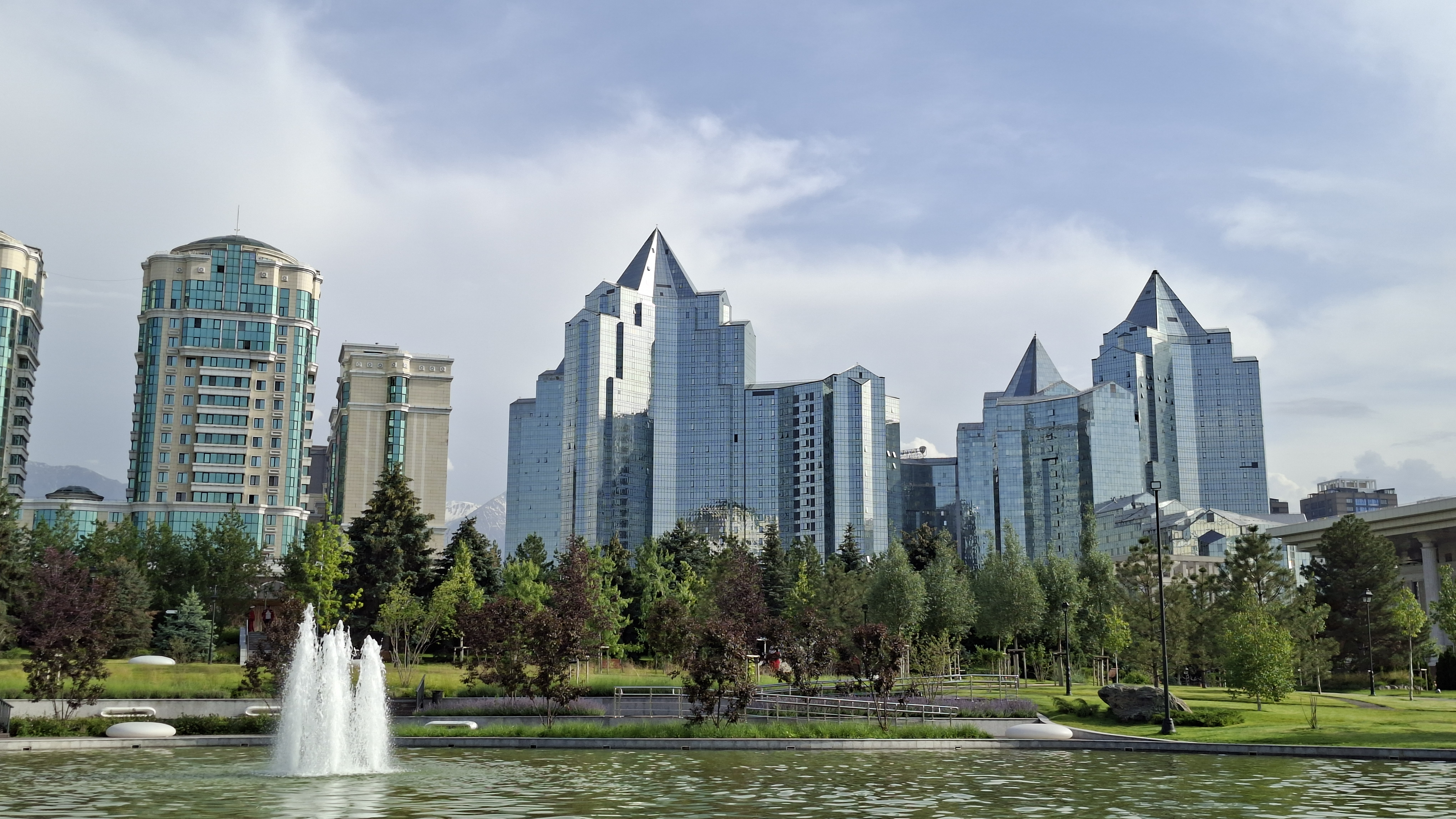
- Almaty from Kök Töbe hill Almaty Museum of Arts Ascension Cathedral Panfilov Street Esplanade Medeu Almaty Botanical Garden Nurly Tau Business Center

- Flag Coat of arms
- Nicknames: "Southern Capital", "Apple City", "Big Apple", "ALA"

- Location in Kazakhstan Almaty (Continental Asia)
- Coordinates: 43°14′N 76°57′E
- Country: Kazakhstan
- First settled: 1000–801 BC
- Founded: 1854
- Incorporated (city): 1867
- Subdivisions: 8 districts

Government
  - Body: City Mäslihat
  - Akim: Darhan Satybaldy

Area
  - City of republican significance: 752 km^{2} (290 sq mi)
  - Metro: 9,395 km^{2} (3,627 sq mi)
- Highest elevation: 1,700 m (5,600 ft)
- Lowest elevation: 500 m (1,600 ft)

Population (1 January 2026)
  - City of republican significance: 2.35 million (estimated)
  - Rank: 1st in Kazakhstan

GDP (Nominal, 2024)
  - City of republican significance: KZT 29,241 billion (US$ 61.406 billion) · 1st
  - Per capita: KZT 12,936,300 (US$ 27,166) · 2nd
- Time zone: UTC+5 (UTC+5)
- Postal code: 050000–050063
- Area code: +7 727
- ISO 3166 code: ALA
- Vehicle registration: 02 (A – on older plates)
- HDI (2023): 0.868 very high · 1st
- Climate: Dfa

Almaty (Note: /ælˈmɑːti/ or /ˈælməti/; Kazakh: Алматы / Almaty, IPA: [ɑɫmɑˈtʰə]; Russian: Алматы, IPA: [ɐɫmɐˈtɨ]) (formerly Alma-Ata) is the most populous city in Kazakhstan, with more than two million residents.

It lies in the foothills of the Trans-Ili Alatau mountains in southern Kazakhstan, near the border with Kyrgyzstan, at an elevation of 700–900 metres (2,300–3,000 feet), with the Big Almaty and Small Almaty rivers running through it. Almaty is the second-largest city in Central Asia (after Tashkent, Uzbekistan) and the fourth-largest in the Commonwealth of Independent States.

Almaty was the capital of Kazakhstan from 1929 to 1991 (during the Soviet era) and after independence until 1997, when the capital was moved to Akmola (now Astana). It is classified as a city of republican significance.

Almaty has hosted international events, including the Alma-Ata Primary Healthcare Conference in 1978, the 2011 Asian Winter Games, and the 2017 Winter Universiade. The city was also a contender to host the 2022 Winter Olympics, but ultimately lost the bid to Beijing.

It has been a UNESCO Creative City of Music since 2017, and classified as a Gamma+ level global city by the Globalization and World Cities Research Network.

Landmarks and attractions in Almaty include the Central State Museum of Kazakhstan; Ascension Cathedral; Green Bazaar; Arbat, a pedestrian area; and Kök Töbe, a hilltop recreation area with views of the city and the surrounding mountains. The city is also home to educational institutions such as Al-Farabi Kazakh National University, the Kazakh-British Technical University, the International Information Technology University, and Narxoz University.

== Status ==
From 1929 to 1936, the city, then known as Alma-Ata, was the capital of the Kazakh ASSR. From 1936 to 1991, Alma-Ata was the capital of the Kazakh SSR. After Kazakhstan became independent in 1991, the city was renamed Almaty in 1993 and continued as the capital until 1997, when the capital was moved to Akmola (renamed Astana in 1998, Nur-Sultan in 2019, and Astana again in 2022). Since then, Almaty has been referred to as the 'southern capital' of Kazakhstan, whose largest and most ethnically diverse city it remains.

== Etymology ==
The name Almaty has its roots in the medieval settlement Almatau, which existed near the present-day city. A disputed theory holds that the name is derived from the Kazakh word for 'apple' (алма), and is often translated as 'full of apples'. Its former name, Alma-Ata, translates to 'father of the apples'. Its current name could be a pluralisation of a Turkic word for 'father'. It is mentioned in the 16th-century Bāburnāma under the spelling Almatu (Chagatay: الماتو). Its past name was Almatau, meaning 'Apple Mountain'.

There is genetic diversity among the wild apples in the Almaty region; the region west of the Tian Shan mountains is thought to be the apple's ancestral home. Nikolay Vavilov suggested that Malus sieversii is a candidate for the ancestor of the modern domestic apple.

== History ==
=== Prehistoric Almaty ===
During the Bronze Age (c. 1000–900 BC), the first farmers and cattle-breeders established settlements in the territory of Almaty. During the Saka period (from 700 BC to the beginning of the Christian era), these lands were occupied by the Saka and later Wusun tribes, who inhabited the territory north of the Tian Shan mountain range. Evidence of these times has been found in the numerous burial mounds (tumuli) and ancient settlements, especially the giant burial mounds of the Saka tsars. The most famous archaeological finds are 'The Golden Man', also known as 'The Golden Warrior', from the Issyk Kurgan; the Zhalauly treasure; the Kargaly diadem; and the Zhetysu bronzes (boilers and altars). During the period of Saka and Wusun governance, Almaty became an early centre of education.

=== 12th–15th centuries ===
The region comprising modern Almaty and its surroundings was ruled by the Qara Khitai during the 12th century, until they were invaded by the Mongol Empire in 1218. It remained under the Mongols until the disintegration of the empire at the end of the century, after which the region continued to be a part of the subsequent Chagatai Khanate, and later of the breakaway Moghulistan.

This region was an important trade route between the West and East, with cities such as Taraz to the west and Almaliq to the east serving as major stopping points. Its importance declined during the 15th century, however, as a result of Temür's attacks and his shifting of the trade routes southwards, after which the Tarim basin became the centre of Moghulistan. Wars with Timur, the Bukhara Khanate, and the Kazakh Khanate weakened Moghul rule in Transoxiana over the 15th century, and by the early 16th century, the Almaty region had come under Kazakh rule.

=== 16th–18th centuries ===
The Dzungars invaded, dominating the Kazakh people for a period. The Kazakhs fought to protect their land and preserve their independence. In 1730, the Kazakhs defeated the Dzungars in the Anyrakay mountains, 70 kilometres (45 miles) north-west of Almaty. The Senior Kazakh Horde (Uly Zhuz) held jurisdiction over the region. During the 18th century, the city and region were near the border of the Khanate of Kokand. It was then absorbed into the Russian Empire in the 1850s.

=== Foundation of Verny ===
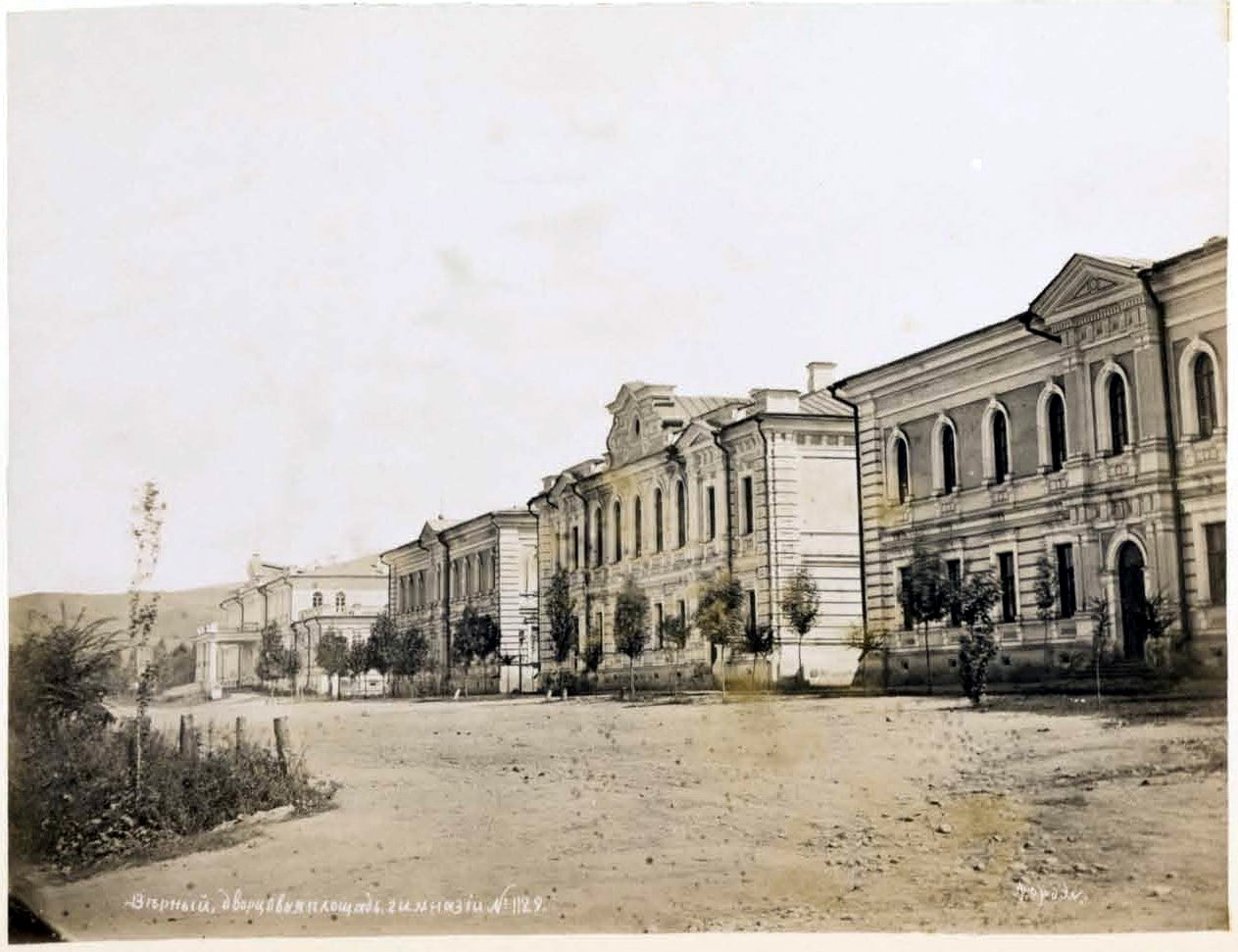
View from the 1880s

To establish its control of the region, Russia built Fort Zailiyskoe (Russian: Заилийское) between the Bolshaya and Malenkaya Almatinka rivers. Construction began on 4 February 1854 and was largely completed by autumn. The fort was a pentagonal wooden palisade, with one side built along the Malaya Almatinka. Before the end of the year, it was renamed Fort Vernoe (Верное, 'Loyal'), sometimes rendered as 'Vyernoe' at the time. The palisade was eventually replaced with a brick wall with embrasures. The fort's main facilities were erected around the large central square for training and parading.

In 1867, the settlement around the fort had grown so large that it was reorganised as the town of Almatinsk (Алматинск). Before the end of the year, this was renamed Verny (Верный, Vernyj).

On 28 May 1887, at 4 a.m., an earthquake nearly destroyed Verny in 11–12 minutes.

By 1906, the population of the city had grown to 27,000, two-thirds of whom were Russians and Ukrainians.

On 3 January 1911, the city was almost completely destroyed, with over 770 brick buildings collapsing as a result of the 1911 Kebin earthquake.

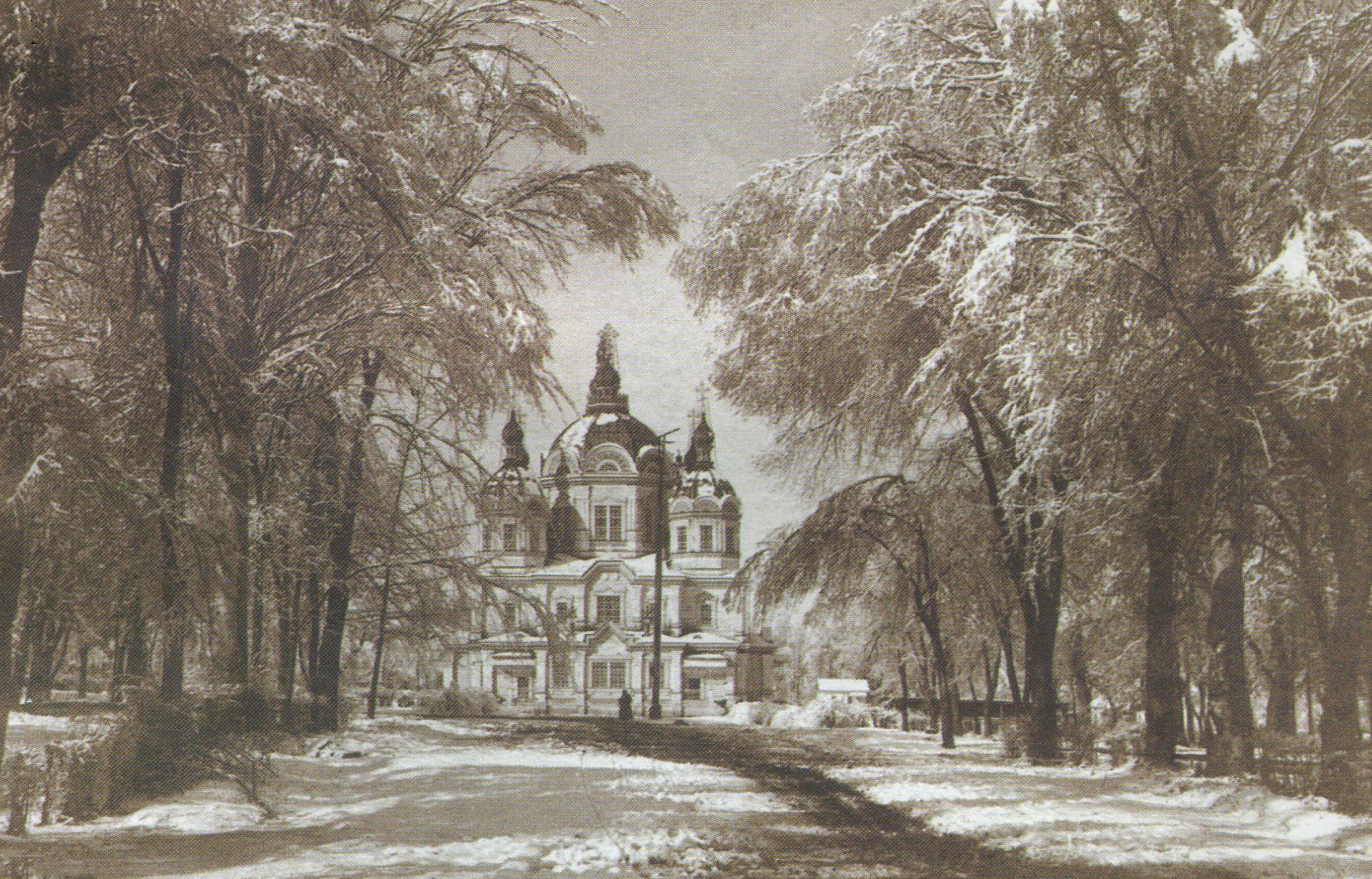
Ascension Cathedral in 1912

=== Soviet era ===
In 1918, in the aftermath of the Russian Revolution and the establishment of Bolshevik rule, Soviet power was established in Verny. The city and surrounding region became part of the Turkestan Autonomous Soviet Socialist Republic within the Russian Soviet Federative Socialist Republic (RSFSR). On 5 February 1921, Verny was renamed Alma-Ata—one of the city's historical names—following a joint consultation involving regional government representatives, professional trade associations, and local religious communities.

In 1926, the Council of Labour and Defence approved the construction of the Turkestan–Siberia Railway, a crucial element in the future growth of Kazakhstan, particularly in the east and southeast. The railway’s construction had a decisive economic impact, shaping Alma-Ata’s destiny as the capital of the Kazakh ASSR. By 1930, the highway and railway links to Alma-Ata were completed.

On 29 April 1927, the government decided to transfer the capital of the Kazakh Autonomous Soviet Socialist Republic from Kyzyl-Orda to Alma-Ata, within the RSFSR. This move attracted increased trade and government personnel, stimulating intensive development in the city.

On 31 January 1928, Leon Trotsky, leader of the 1917 October Revolution, was exiled to Alma-Ata by Joseph Stalin, then head of the All-Union Communist Party (Bolsheviks) in Moscow. He was accompanied by his wife, Natalia Sedova, and their son, Lev Sedov. In February 1929, Trotsky was expelled from Alma-Ata to Turkey, before eventually going into exile in Mexico City.

Alma-Ata Airport opened in 1930, establishing an air link to Moscow, the seat of the Soviet government. Alma-Ata became the primary air gateway to the Kazakh SSR, a status it retains to this day. The transformation of the town into the capital of the Kazakh SSR was accelerated by large-scale construction of new administrative buildings, government facilities and housing. The Great Purge of 1936–38 extended to the Kazakh SSR, resulting in numerous deaths and consolidating Soviet control over the population. During the 1930s, Kazakh nomads suffered severe starvation following the disruption of their traditional way of life (see: Asharshylyq).

In 1936, the Architecture and Planning Bureau devised a plan to enhance Alma-Ata’s role as the new cultural capital of the Kazakh SSR. The plan built upon the existing rectangular district layout, aiming to strengthen and reconstruct these areas.

==== World War II ====
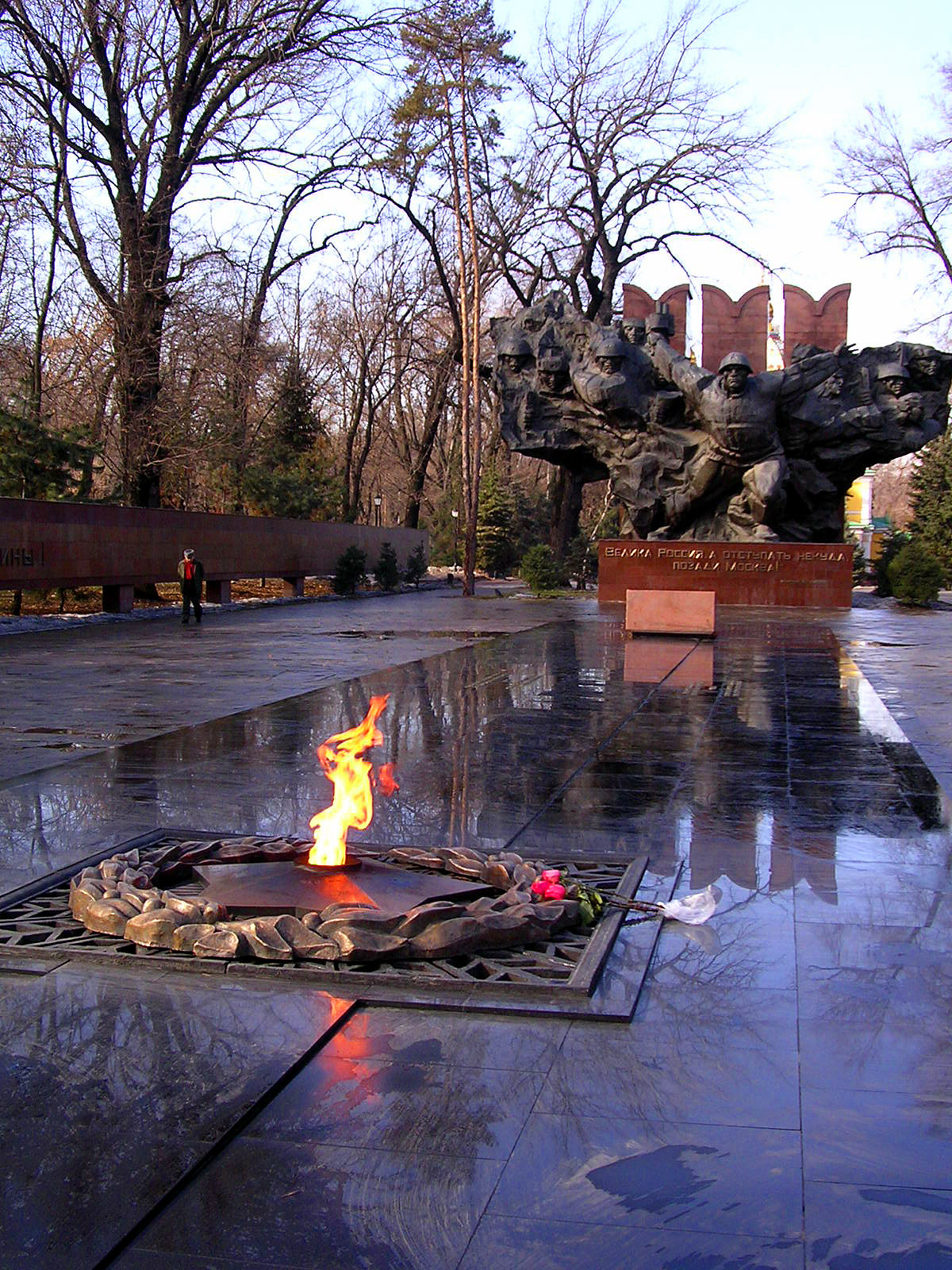
World War II monument "Feat" in Park of the 28 Panfilov Guardsmen

During World War II the government affected the city's population and structures. To better organize the home front and concentrate industrial and material resources, the government evacuated 26,000 people and numerous industries from the European theatre of war. Alma-Ata hosted over 30 industrial facilities removed from the European section of the USSR, eight evacuated hospitals, 15 institutes, universities and technical schools; and around 20 cultural institutions. Motion picture production companies from Leningrad, Kyiv, and Moscow were also moved to Alma-Ata at this time. This brought in so many ethnic Russians that the Kazakhs became a minority in the region. In connection with the formation of the Polish Anders' Army, a Polish diplomatic post was located in the city from October 1941 to July 1942.

==== Industrialization ====
During the years 1941–1945, industrial development increased during the postwar years. The population of the city grew from 104,000 in 1919 to 365,000 in 1968. By 1967 the city had 145 enterprises, with the bulk of these being light and food industries.

The main industries in Alma-Ata were: food processing (36% of gross industrial output), light industry (31%), and heavy industry (33%). The main products of the region were:

- Food: Meat, flour and cereals (pasta factory), milk, wines, canned fruit, tobacco, confectionery, alcoholic spirits, beer, yeast, and tea (packaging)
- Light industry: textiles, fur, knitting, carpets, footwear, apparel, printing, and the Almaty Cotton combine.
- Heavy industry: electrical engineering, foundry engineering, car repair, bearing repair, building materials, woodworking, concrete structures and structural elements, and housebuilding.

==== Urban development ====
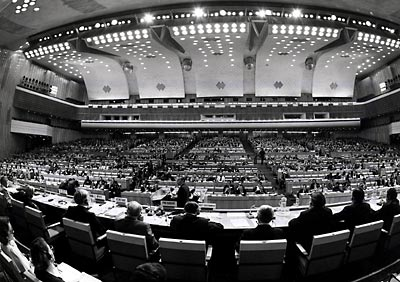
The International conference on Primary Health Care in 1978, known as the Alma-Ata Declaration

From 1966 to 1971, 1,400,000 square metres of public and cooperative housing were built. Annually, around 300,000 square metres of dwellings were under construction. Most of the buildings constructed during this time were earthquake-proof multi-story buildings. The Soviet government tried to diversify architectural forms to create a more varied cityscape. During this period, many schools, hospitals, cultural, and entertainment facilities were constructed, including Lenin's Palace, the Kazakhstan Hotel, and the Medeo Sports Complex.

The supersonic transport Tupolev Tu-144 went into service on 26 December 1975, carrying mail and freight between Moscow and Alma-Ata in preparation for passenger services; these began in November 1977. The Aeroflot flight on 1 June 1978 was the 55th and last scheduled passenger flight of the Tu-144.

Alma-Ata was the host city for a 1978 international conference on Primary Health Care. The Alma Ata Declaration was adopted, marking a paradigm shift in global public health.

On 16 December 1986, the Jeltoqsan riot took place in the Brezhnev Square (now Republic Square) in response to General Secretary Mikhail Gorbachev's dismissal of Dinmukhamed Kunayev.

On 7 September 1988, the subway Almaty Metro project began construction, and the subway was opened on 1 December 2011 after 23 years.

=== Post-independence ===
Kazakhstan declared its independence from the Soviet Union on 16 December 1991 (Kazakhstan Independence Day). On 28 January 1993, the government renamed the city from the Russian Alma-Ata to the Kazakh name Almaty. In 1997 the President of the Republic of Kazakhstan Nursultan Nazarbayev approved the decree to transfer the capital from Almaty to Astana in the north of the country.

On 1 July 1998 a law was passed to establish the special status of Almaty as a scientific, cultural, historical, financial, and industrial centre.

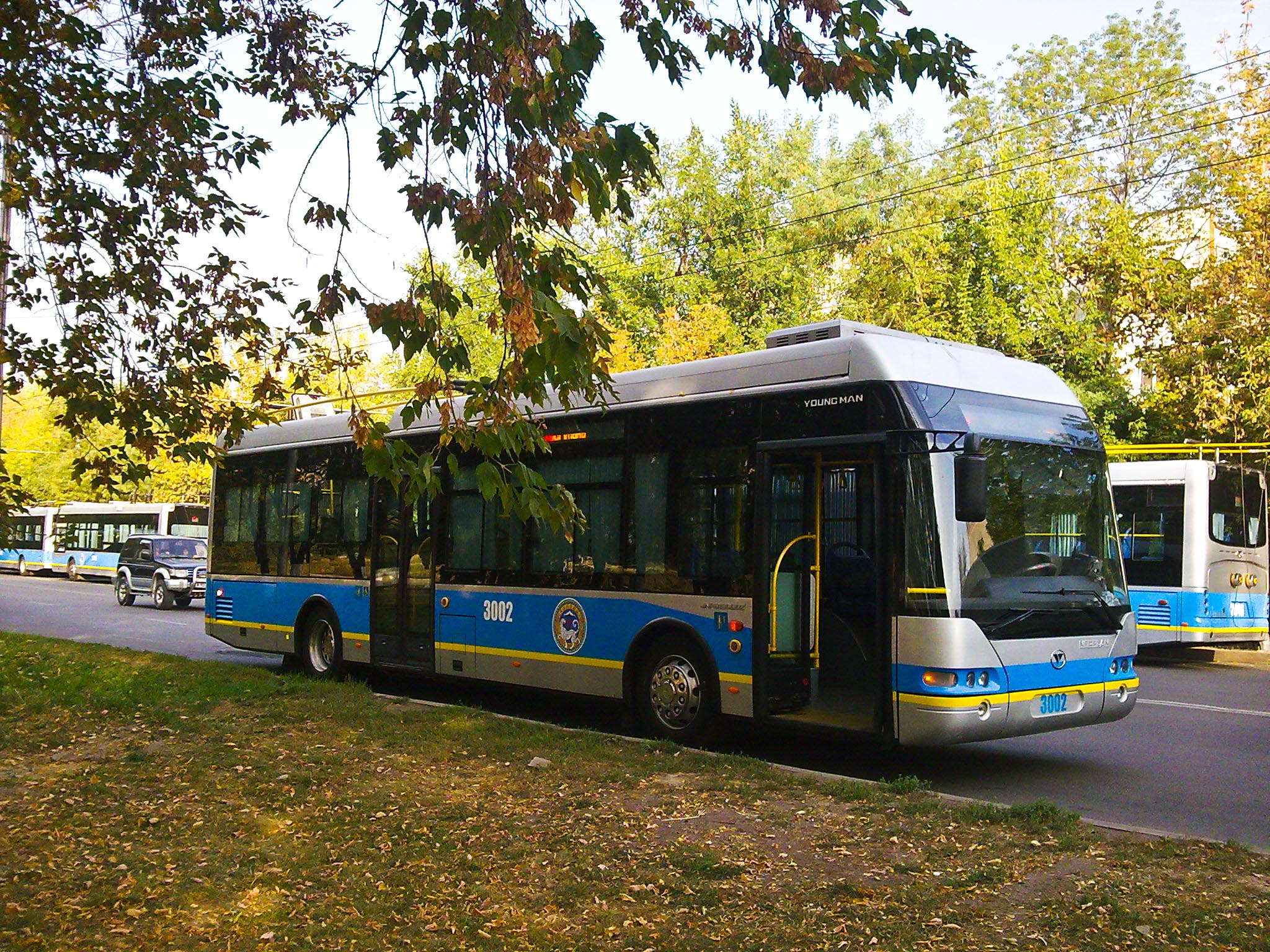
Trolleybus in Almaty city

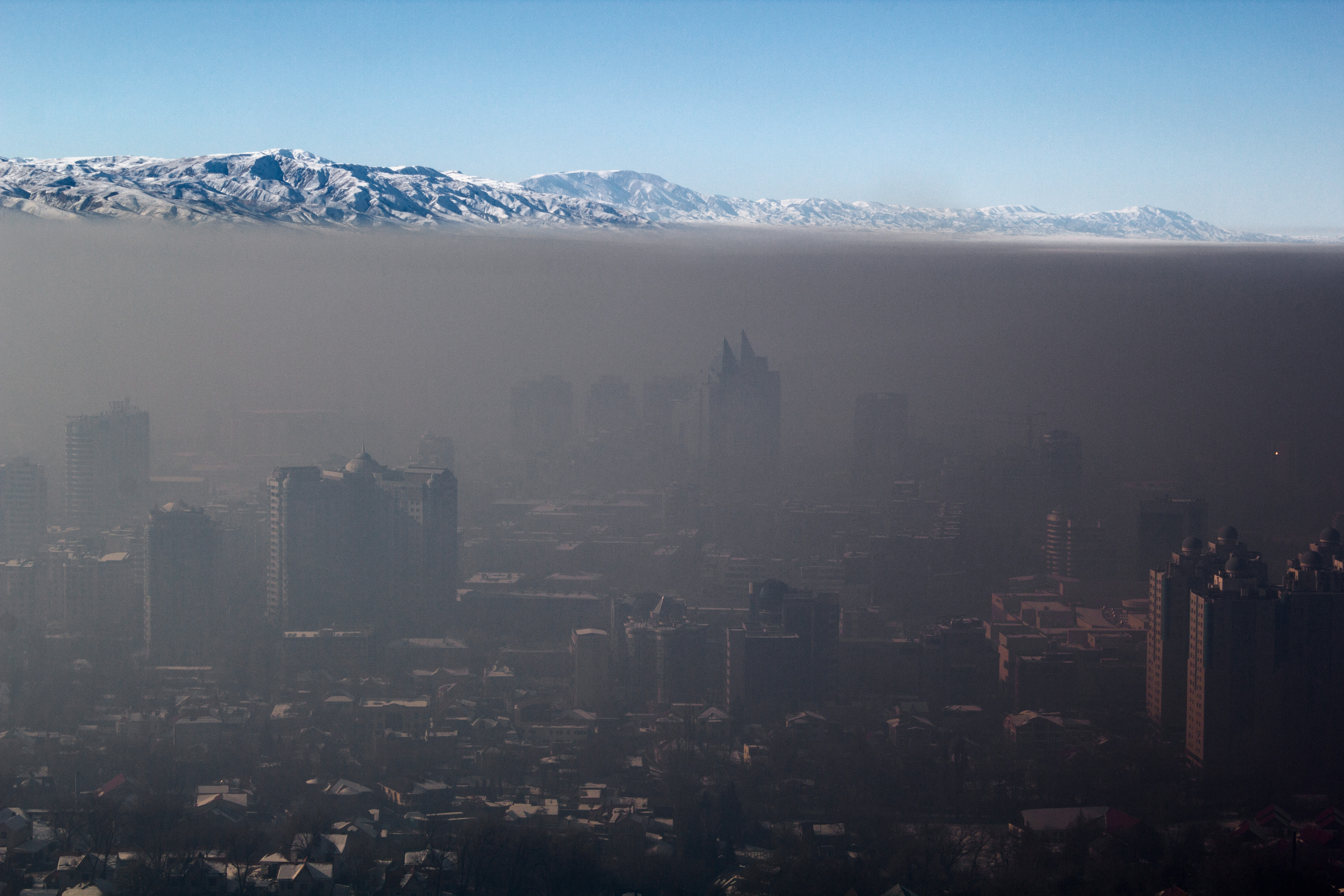
Picture taken during a temperature inversion, showing smog trapped over Almaty

The new general plan of Almaty for 2030 was released in 1998. It is intended to create ecologically safe and socially comfortable living conditions in the city. The main objective is to promote Almaty's image as a garden-city.

It proposes continued multi-storied and single-housing development, reorganization of industrial districts or territories, improving transport infrastructure, and expanding the Almaty Metro. The first line of the Almaty metro was launched on 1 December 2011, two weeks ahead of schedule. The extension of the line to Qalqaman was opened in 2015.

Nevertheless, Almaty has developed a major problem with air pollution. Already in 1995, particulate emissions, then from the city's thermal power station, exceeded Kazakh and EU standards by over 20 times. In 2008, Almaty was ranked the 9th most polluted city in the world. A 2013 study identified cars as a major source of pollution, and it was noted since 2003 and 2013 morbidity had increased by a factor of 1.5, and that the city takes the first place in the republic on respiratory, endocrine and blood diseases, cancer and bronchial asthma, even though there are no major industrial installations. An independent local air quality monitoring system with a mobile app was launched in 2017.

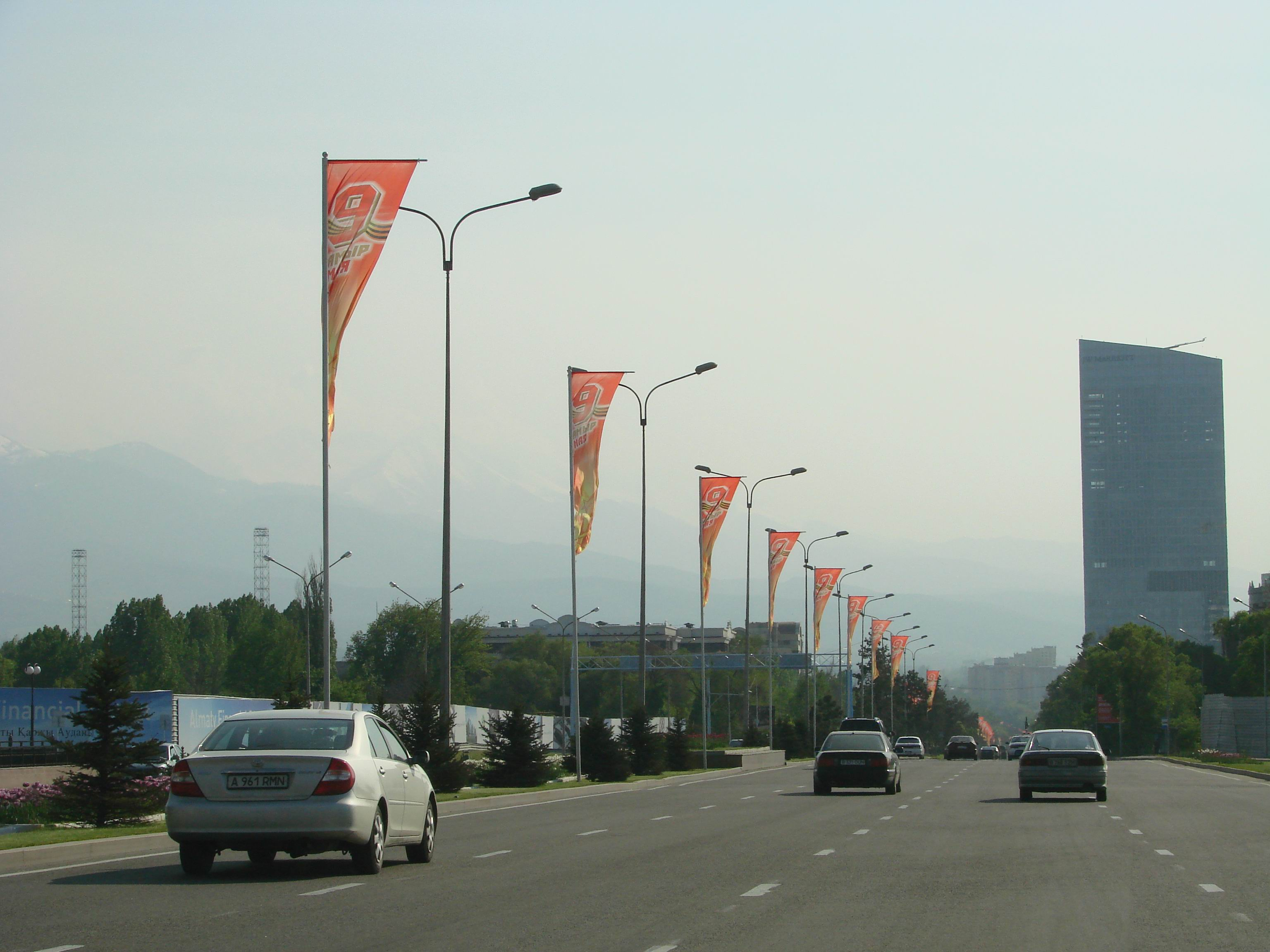
Al-Farabi Avenue

The area of the city has been expanded during recent years with the annexation of the suburban settlements of Kalkaman, Kok Tobe, Gorniy Gigant District (Mountain Giant). Numerous apartment blocks and office skyscrapers have transformed the face of the town, which has been built into the mountains. Squatter settlements such as Shanyrak have resisted eviction in the face of these development plans.

Almaty was the site of a notorious terrorist attack in July 2016, when Jihadist Ruslan Kulikbayev killed eight police officers and two civilians in a shootout and car chase. Kulikbayev was wounded during the shootout and later sentenced to death for the attack.

In March 2020, the first cases of COVID-19 were reported in the city. Soon, Almaty was transformed, as the pandemic led the city into a changed behavior. The government imposed lockdowns of most institutions.

In January 2022, Almaty was plunged into unrest as part of a national political crisis.

== Administrative divisions ==
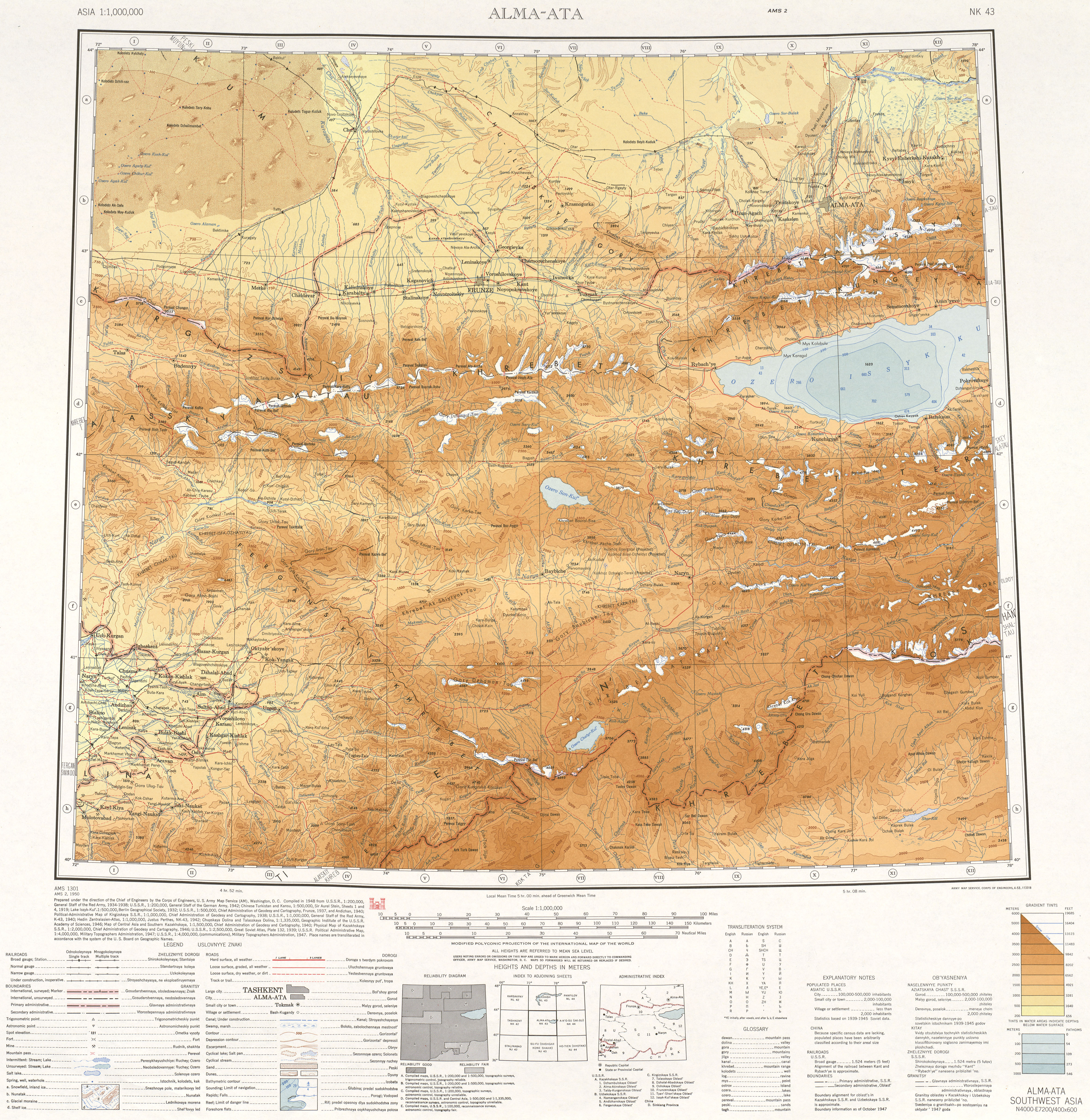
Map of Almaty (labeled as ALMA-ATA) and surrounding region from the International Map of the World (1948)

There are 8 official Almaty city districts : Alatau district
Almaly district
Auezov district
Bostandyk district
Jetysu district
Medeu district
Nauryzbay district
Turksib district

== Geography ==
Almaty is located in south-eastern Kazakhstan, almost 1000 km from the capital Astana. Kyrgyzstan's capital Bishkek is 190 km to the west, while Ürümqi in China is almost 1000 km east.

The region is also home to the Mynjylky mountain plateau, an elevated plain located at the source of the Malaya Almaatinka river at an altitude of 3000 meters above sea level.

=== Climate ===
Almaty has a humid continental climate (Köppen climate classification: Dfa) with hot summers and cold winters. It is characterized by the influence of mountain–valley circulation. This is evident in the northern part of the city, located directly in the transition zone of the mountain slopes to the plains.

Almaty city districts

Annual average air temperature is equal to 10 °C (50 °F), the coldest month is January, −4.7 °C (24 °F) (on average), the warmest month (July) 23.8 °C (75 °F) (on average). In average years frost starts on about 14 October and ends on about 18 April, with sustained extreme cold from about 19 December to about 23 February, a period of about 67 days. Weather with temperature above 30 °C (86 °F) is average for about 36 days a year. In the center of Almaty, like any large city, there is a heat island. Therefore, frost in the city center starts about 7 days later and finishes 3 days earlier than in the northern suburbs. Annual precipitation is about 650 to 700 mm (25.6 to 27.6 in). April and May are the wettest months, during which about a third of the city's annual precipitation is received.

It is not uncommon to see snow hitting Almaty as late as the end of May, as in the last quarter century, such snowfalls were recorded on 13 May 1985, 1 May 1989, 5 May 1993 and 18 May 1998.

Almaty sometimes experiences winter rain, even with heavy preceding snowfall and low temperatures. The most memorable winter rain took place on 16 December 1996 during a military parade to celebrate the 5th anniversary of the Independence of the Republic.

Almaty Weather Station's GM records south-easterly wind (30%), its resistance increases during the summer (37%) and falls in winter (19%). Wind speeds exceed 15 m/s on about 15 days a year, on average.

Climate data for Almaty (1991–2020, extremes 1879–present)
Month	Jan	Feb	Mar	Apr	May	Jun	Jul	Aug	Sep	Oct	Nov	Dec	Year
Record high °C (°F)	16.8 (62.2)	21.9 (71.4)	29.8 (85.6)	33.2 (91.8)	35.8 (96.4)	39.3 (102.7)	41.7 (107.1)	40.5 (104.9)	38.1 (100.6)	31.4 (88.5)	26.5 (79.7)	19.2 (66.6)	41.7 (107.1)
Mean daily maximum °C (°F)	0.5 (32.9)	2.7 (36.9)	9.9 (49.8)	17.8 (64.0)	22.9 (73.2)	27.9 (82.2)	30.5 (86.9)	29.7 (85.5)	24.5 (76.1)	16.9 (62.4)	8.1 (46.6)	2.0 (35.6)	16.1 (61.0)
Daily mean °C (°F)	−4.6 (23.7)	−2.4 (27.7)	4.5 (40.1)	12.1 (53.8)	17.1 (62.8)	22.1 (71.8)	24.4 (75.9)	23.3 (73.9)	18.0 (64.4)	10.6 (51.1)	2.9 (37.2)	−2.7 (27.1)	10.4 (50.7)
Mean daily minimum °C (°F)	−8.1 (17.4)	−6.2 (20.8)	−0.2 (31.6)	6.8 (44.2)	11.5 (52.7)	16.4 (61.5)	18.6 (65.5)	17.3 (63.1)	12.0 (53.6)	5.3 (41.5)	−1.0 (30.2)	−6.1 (21.0)	5.5 (41.9)
Record low °C (°F)	−30.1 (−22.2)	−37.7 (−35.9)	−24.8 (−12.6)	−10.9 (12.4)	−7.0 (19.4)	2.0 (35.6)	7.3 (45.1)	4.7 (40.5)	−3.0 (26.6)	−11.9 (10.6)	−34.1 (−29.4)	−31.8 (−25.2)	−37.7 (−35.9)
Average precipitation mm (inches)	34.7 (1.37)	42.6 (1.68)	72.4 (2.85)	112.4 (4.43)	98.7 (3.89)	59.0 (2.32)	42.9 (1.69)	33.5 (1.32)	27.8 (1.09)	49.8 (1.96)	55.3 (2.18)	44.3 (1.74)	673.4 (26.52)
Average extreme snow depth cm (inches)	15 (5.9)	14 (5.5)	5 (2.0)	0 (0)	0 (0)	0 (0)	0 (0)	0 (0)	0 (0)	1 (0.4)	2 (0.8)	8 (3.1)	15 (5.9)
Average precipitation days (≥ 1 mm)	6.2	6.7	9.2	10.3	9.3	7.4	7.0	4.5	3.4	5.7	6.7	6.7	83.1
Average rainy days	4	5	11	14	15	15	15	10	9	10	8	6	122
Average snowy days	11	13	8	2	0.2	0	0	0	0.1	2	6	11	53
Average relative humidity (%)	77	79	71	59	56	49	46	45	49	64	74	79	62
Average dew point °C (°F)	−14.9 (5.2)	−12.1 (10.2)	−5.0 (23.0)	1.1 (34.0)	5.7 (42.3)	8.1 (46.6)	9.0 (48.2)	7.9 (46.2)	4.1 (39.4)	−0.5 (31.1)	−6.4 (20.5)	−12.7 (9.1)	−1.3 (29.7)
Mean monthly sunshine hours	112.0	119.0	163.0	187.8	235.3	260.0	280.3	277.7	243.6	188.9	116.6	94.0	2,278.2
Source 1: Pogoda.ru
Source 2: NOAA, Weather.Directory

=== Seismic activity in the territory of Kazakhstan ===
Industrially developed and populated areas in the south and southeast of Kazakhstan are situated in the zones where the maximum magnitudes of expected earthquakes are from 6.0 to 8.3 (the intensity of I0=8–10).

The south seismic active zone of Kazakhstan is a part of the North Tian-Shan ridge system. The main city of Almaty is located near the Zailiski Alatau mountain base. In recorded history prior to the late 19th century, three catastrophic earthquakes are known to have taken place there. The following are the dates of occurrence and extracts from the historical chronicles of the times:

- 1770, "...Belovodka village was buried";
- 1807, "a horrible catastrophe took place in Almaty";
- 1865, strong earthquake.

Within the past 125 years, three more strong destructive earthquakes occurred here, with centres not more than 20–130 kilometres (10–80 mi) from the current city location. Their magnitudes were 9 and 11 on the MSK scale – 64, and their centres were located within 100 kilometres (60 mi). Centres were located in a south and south–east directions:

- (1887 y., K=17.14) Vernenskoe
- (1889 y., K=19.12) Chilik
- (1911 y., K=18.76) Keminskoe

In each of these earthquakes, the city suffered wide destruction. The Territory of the Kyrgyz State adjoins North Tian-Shan.

== Demographics ==
Historical population
Year	Pop.	±%
1897	22,744	—
1926	45,385	+99.5%
1939	230,503	+407.9%
1959	457,709	+98.6%
1970	729,633	+59.4%
1979	909,644	+24.7%
1989	1,127,884	+24.0%
1999	1,129,356	+0.1%
2009	1,449,696	+28.4%
2021	2,030,285	+40.0%

Ethnic Group	2021		2025	
Ethnic Group	Population	%	Population	%
Kazakhs	1,286,229	63.35%	1,471,393	64.19%
Russians	429,898	20.48%	428,952	18.75%
Uyghurs	112,753	5.55%	122,390	5.34%
Koreans	36,632	1.80%	39,211	1.71%
Tatars	30,449	1.50%	31,435	1.37%
Ukrainians	21,030	1.04%	21,184	0.92%
Azeris	18,890	0.93%	22,002	0.96%
Dungans	14,545	0.72%	18,156	0.79%
Germans	12,450	0.61%	12,775	0.55%
Uzbeks	11,445	0.56%	14,684	0.64%
Other Ethnicity or Not Stated	70,157	3.45%	108,927	4.75%
Total	2,030,285	100%	2,292,055	100%

=== Ethnic composition ===
Residents of Almaty of different ethnic backgrounds at the Spirit of Tengri festival, Abai Square

According to the 1989 Soviet census, Kazakhs made up 22.5% of Almaty's population, while Russians accounted for 59.1%. By 1999, the share of Kazakhs had risen to 38.5%, while the share of Russians had fallen to 45.2%. In the 2009 census, Kazakhs became the largest ethnic group in the city, accounting for 53.0% of the population, while Russians made up 33.2%.

The shift continued after 2009. In the 2021 census, Kazakhs accounted for 63.35% of the city's population and Russians for 20.48%. At the beginning of 2025, their shares were 64.19% and 18.75%, respectively.

=== Religion ===
Religion	2021	
Religion	Population	%
Islam	1,172,838	57.77%
Christianity	353,477	17.41%
No religion	87,622	4.32%
Buddhism	4,452	0.22%
Judaism	2,184	0.11%
Other Religion	4,865	0.24%
Not Stated	404,847	19.94%
Total	2,030,285	100%

== Culture ==
Almaty was, in 2020, considered to be "Kazakhstan's cultural capital", as contemporary Almaty has a more European character due to more cafes and restaurants with outdoor seating and public green space. Almaty is the historical capital of intellectualism in Kazakhstan as a product of Almaty's location along the Silk Road, and because many Russian intellectuals were exiled to the region.

The Abai Kazakh State Opera and Ballet Theatre has placed the city's theater scene since 1934 and was founded around a community of local performance artists. The Kasteyev State Museum of Arts was founded in 1935, is the largest museum in Kazakhstan, and has the largest collection of artworks by Kazakh classic and contemporary artists. The wild apple Malus sieversii is generally accepted as having first emerged in the Almaty area and figure in Almaty's culture.

=== Theaters ===
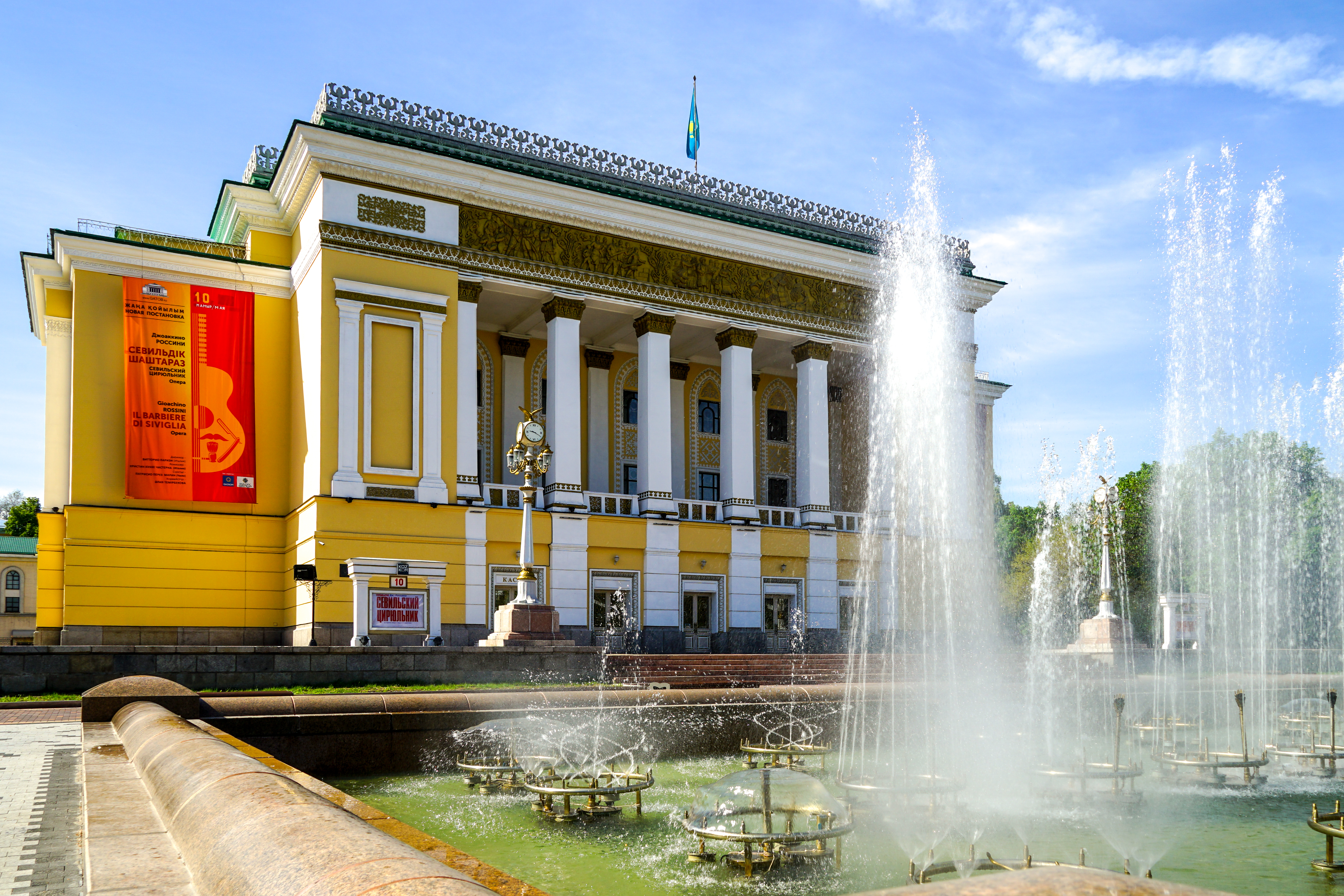
Abay Opera House

Theatrical art began to develop in the city of Verny a few years after the construction of the Russian fort. On 21 November 1872, the Society of Dramatic Art Lovers staged the first production in the city: A. N. Ostrovsky's play, "Stay in Your Own Sled". Later, plays were performed at public, military, and commercial gatherings. An abridgement of Glinka's opera "A Life for the Tsar" was the first opera staged in the city, by the Kolpakovsky three-year city school on 23 February 1913 at the Commercial Assembly, to commemorate the tercentenary of the Romanov dynasty.

The flowering of theatrical art in the city began during the Soviet period of Alma-Ata, resulting from the transfer of the capital of the Kazakh Soviet Socialist Republic from Kyzylorda to Alma-Ata. Thus, the Kazakh Drama Theater, the first Kazakh professional theater, moved to the city. In the 1930s, the Opera and Ballet Theater (1934) and the Puppet Theater (1935) were established in the city. Also, theater companies founded in different cities of the republic began to move to the capital: the Russian Drama Theater (moved from Semipalatinsk in 1934), the Uyghur Musical Comedy Theater (from Chilik, 1962), the Korean Musical Comedy Theater (from Kyzylorda, 1968), and the German Drama Theater (from Temirtau, 1989).

After Kazakhstan regained independence in 1991, a large number of new independent theaters appeared in the city. Often these are modern youth concert venues created by enthusiasts. They face funding problems, as maintaining a permanent theater company is costly.

=== Museums ===
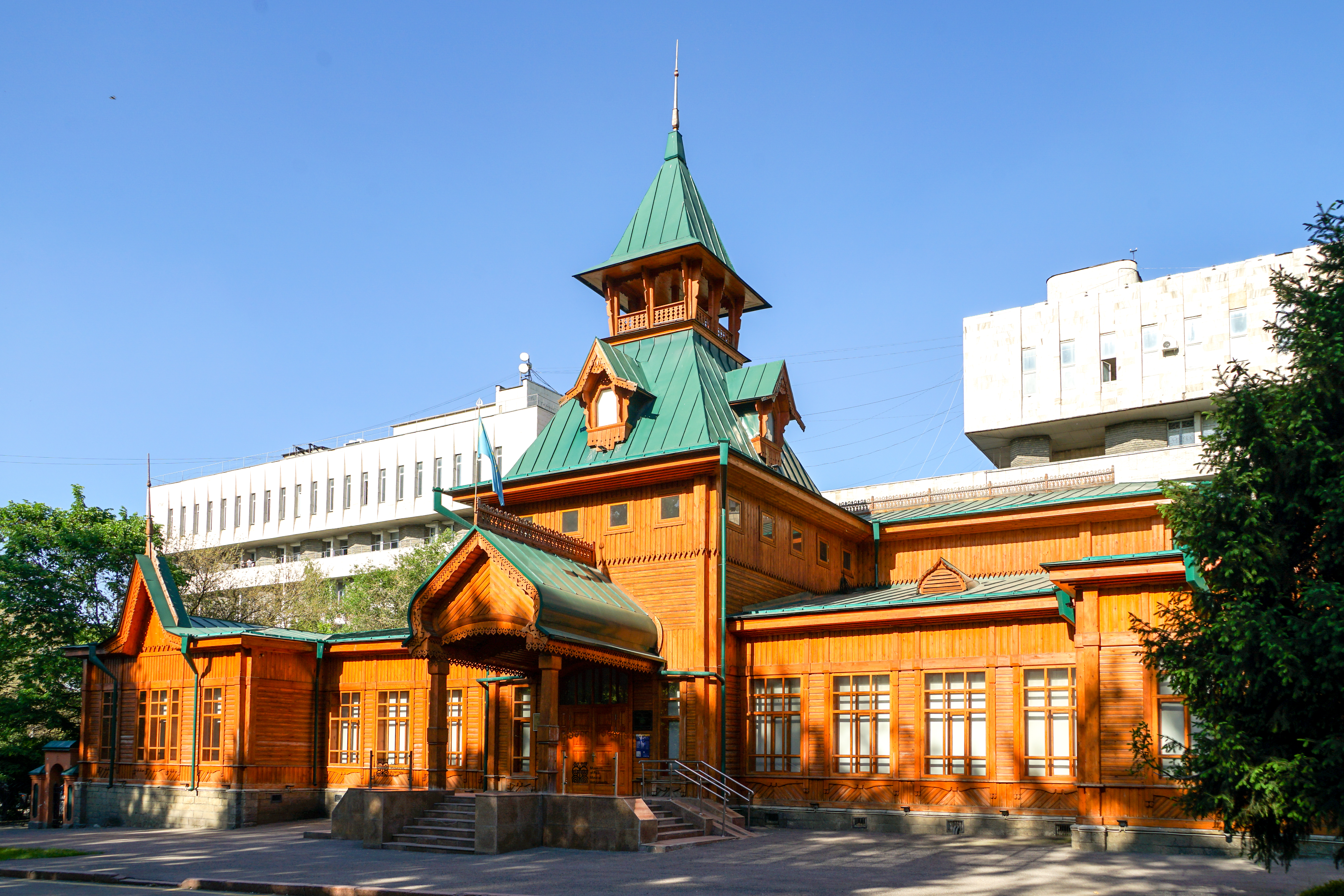
Kazakh Museum of Folk Musical Instruments

A contribution to the study of the history of culture, ethnography of southern Kazakhs in the late 19th–20th centuries was made by Turkestan scientists and local historians, united around the scientific societies and cultural and educational institutions of Tashkent. In 1874, from the private collections of travelers who visited Semirechye with a scientific and regional purpose and with the help of the local intelligentsia, a museum was first created in the city of Verny, which was later transformed into a village museum of the Semirechye Cossack Host. This date is the day of the foundation of the first museum in Semirechye. The foundation of the A. Kasteev Museum of Arts was laid by the Kazakh State Art Gallery named after T.G. Shevchenko, founded in 1935. Its main tasks were to collect the best works of Kazakh artists and organize their creative business trips.

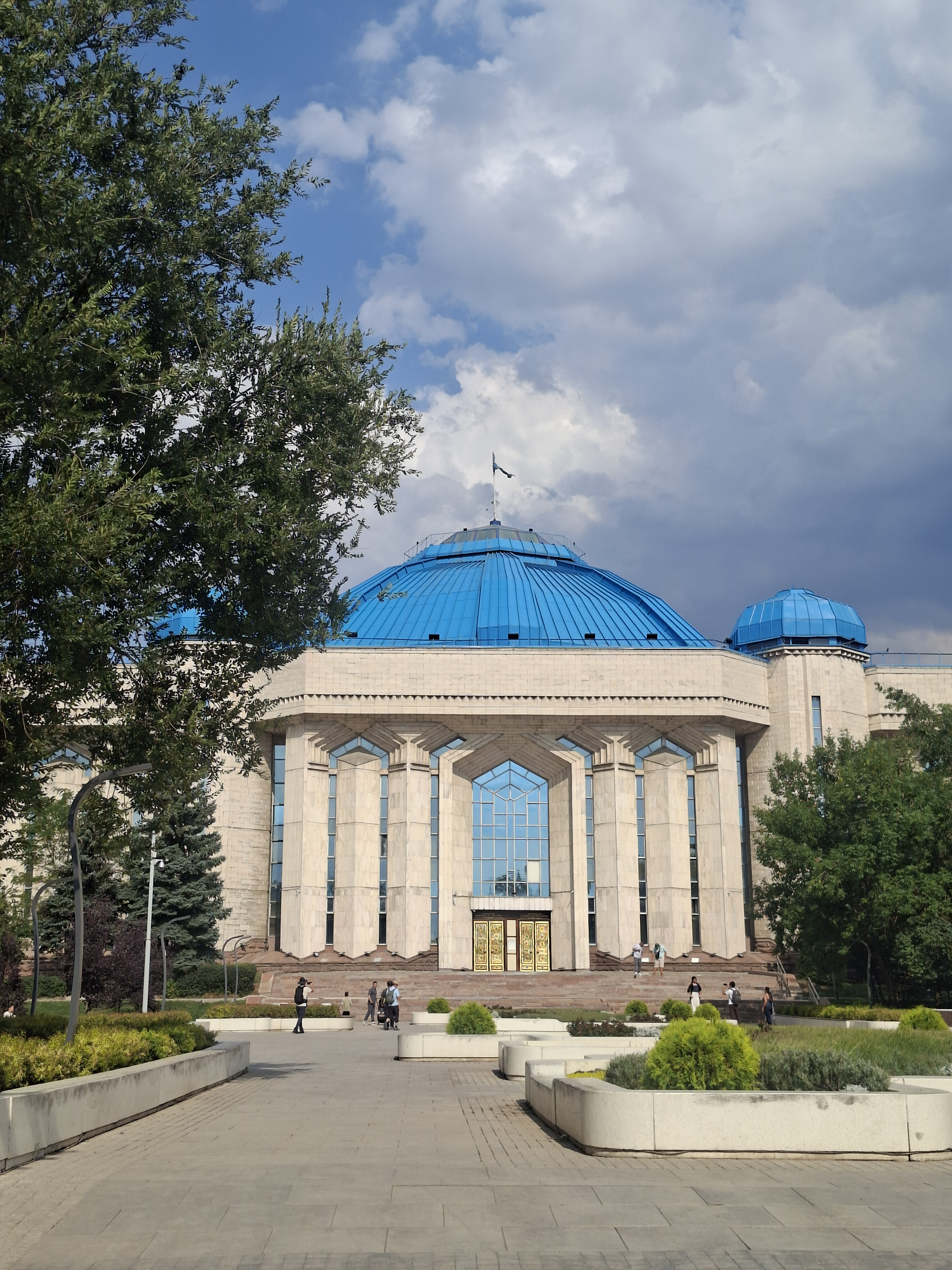
Central State Museum of Kazakhstan

In 1936, museums in Moscow and Leningrad (now St. Petersburg) donated a significant number of paintings, graphics, sculpture and applied art to the gallery. By the end of the 1950s, the gallery's funds numbered over 5,000 exhibits, including paintings, reproductions of works by pre-revolutionary and Soviet artists, Western European and Eastern masters of art. In the 1970s and 1980s, new buildings were built for existing museums, and new thematic museums were opened: books, musical instruments, archeology, and others. A significant contribution to the development of the museum business was the opening of the Museum of the History of Almaty, which created an association of museums in the city of Almaty and the state institution "Gylym Ordasy", which united 4 museums, which allows to systematize scientific work.

=== Cinemas ===
The first film screening in the city of Verny took place in 1900, when the physicist K.O. Krause arrived in the city. On it, hand-painted glass transparencies were demonstrated with the help of an overhead projector. The film show took place on 25 January in the Pushkin Garden. In January 1911, the building of the first private cinema "Twentieth Century" was opened at the intersection of Pushkin and Gogol streets, which belonged to the entrepreneur A. R. Seifullin. For the demonstration of films, the cinema was equipped with the first power plant in the history of the city, produced by the British company "Petter", with 14 horsepower. The cinema building burned down in February 1918.

Starting in the 1930s, summer cinemas began to appear in the parks of the city, which were later transformed into full-fledged cinemas. Thus, the Rodina Cinema was first opened in the Central Park in 1937. In 1957, it was rebuilt from a seasonal venue into a wide-screen cinema with an auditorium for 712 seats. In another park of the city, the Park of the Federation of Soviet Republics, the Progress Cinema was opened, later renamed Alma-Ata. By the early 1990s, there were 21 cinemas in the city. All cinemas were divided into first, second and third screens. The cinemas of the first screen, in which the premieres of new films took place, were "Alatau", "Tselinny" and "Arman". Film films arrived at the cinemas of the third screen in a deplorable state, with glues and cuts. That is, the quality of showing the film depended on the screening of the cinema. Cinemas in the city were single-screen, two halls were owned by the cinema centers "Kazakhstan", "Arman" and "Tselinny". In the 2000s, cinemas began to open in shopping and entertainment centers, and as a result, existing stationary cinemas began to lose popularity and close.

== Economy ==
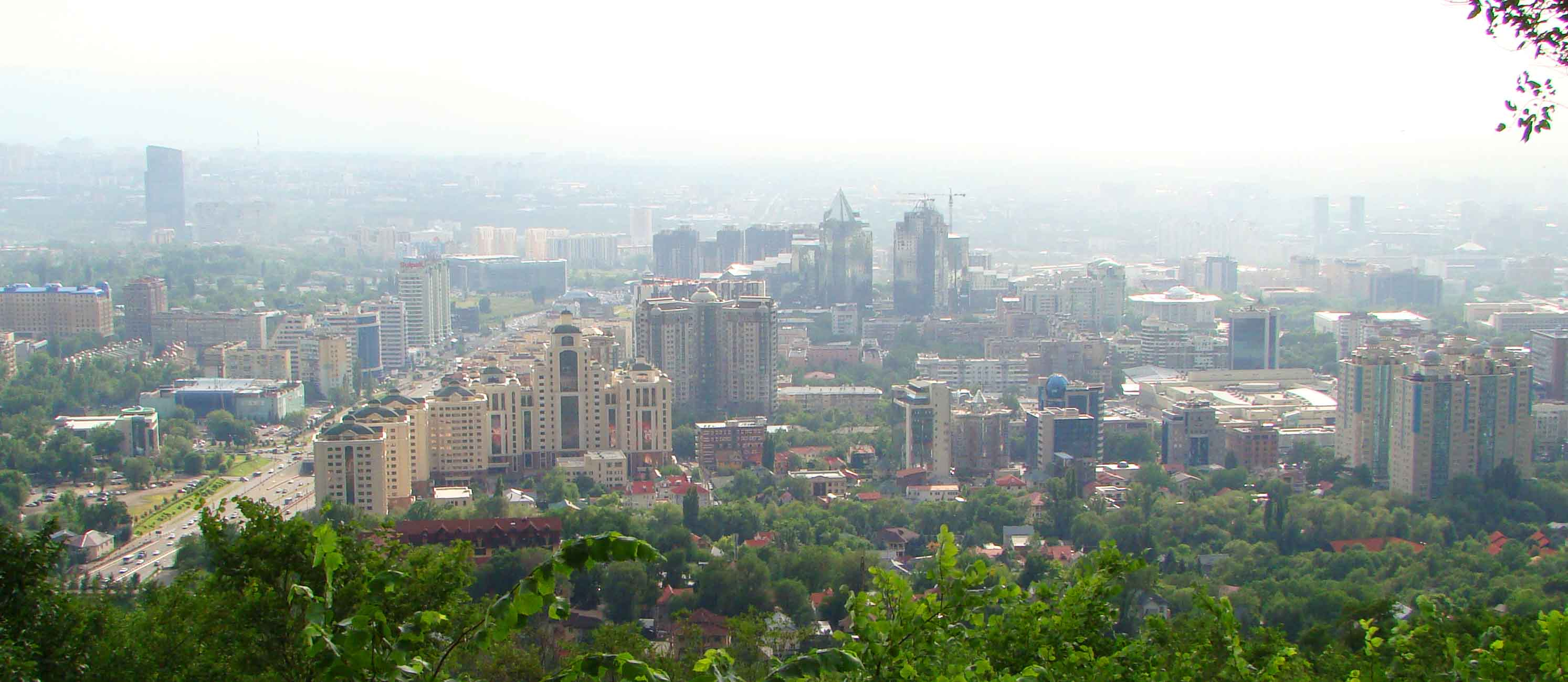
View of Almaty from Kök-Töbe

Almaty generates approximately 20% of Kazakhstan's GDP (or $36 billion in 2010). The city accounts for about 20% of government revenues and 60% of bank credits. Almaty is also a financial center, as is considered to be a Beta-Global City as of the 2012 GaWC study.

One of the industries in Almaty is finance, and its financial exports make it a large contributor to Kazakhstan's balance of payments. Almaty is home to Halyk Bank, which is the largest bank in Central Asia, Kaspi Bank, and other major banks. The Kazakhstan Stock Exchange is based in Almaty.

Almaty is also developing as a regional financial and business centre (RFCA).

Under construction is the 'Almaty Financial District and Esentai Park'. This was designed by T.J. Gottesdiener, who designed both 7 World Trade Center in New York City and Tokyo Midtown. Its goal is to become the largest business centre in Central Asia. Esentai Tower, a 37-floor building in the park, is the tallest mixed-use building in Kazakhstan, housing offices of companies such as Ernst & Young, HSBC and Credit Suisse. The first Ritz-Carlton Hotel in Kazakhstan opened in 2013 in Esentai Tower.

Media companies are concentrated in Almaty, as the media distribution industry has been growing rapidly since 2006. Major broadcasting channels KTK and NTK are based in Almaty, as are several national newspapers.

The Western Europe – Western China Highway passes through Almaty. A new airport in Almaty expects to handle about 45 million tonnes of cargo each year. In 2010, Air Astana was headquartered in Almaty. Before their dissolution, Air Kazakhstan and Kazakhstan Airlines were also headquartered in Almaty.

== Cityscape ==
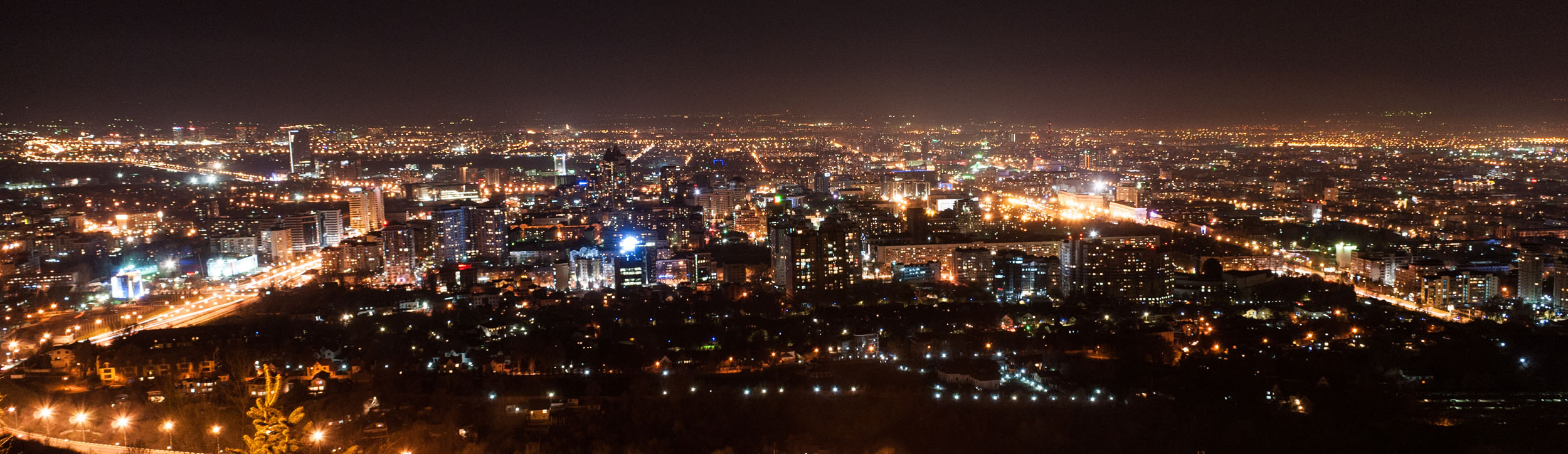
Panoramic night view of Almaty from Kok-Tobe, 2012

In 1854, the Tsarist government built a military fortification on the left bank of the Almaty River.

The construction was supervised by Major Peremyshelsky and engineer-lieutenant Aleksandrovsky. By the autumn of the same year, construction work was completed. With their arrival, the area of Almaty began to develop rapidly, and buildings were constructed during this time including the Little Stanitsa and the Tatar Slobodka. A major earthquake in 1887 destroyed 1798 brick houses and killed 322 people.

After the earthquake, numerous buildings were constructed including the House of the Regiment of Military Assembly (1908), Ascension Cathedral, the House of Public Assembly, and others. Paul Gourdet, who is credited for most of Almaty's urban architecture of the time, used an approach to design Russian Revival architecture, which is evident in some of his designs including the Medical College, the Voznesensky Cathedral, the merchant Shakhvorostov's house, the former Women's College, the former City Orphanage, and numerous other buildings. At the time, Zenkov was in charge of the construction projects of the Semirechye regional government.

From 1966 to 1972, most of the buildings constructed during the era were earthquake-proof multi-story housing blocks. During this period, many schools, hospitals, cultural, and entertainment facilities were constructed in post-modernist style, including Lenin's Palace (now Palace of the Republic, 1970), Hotel Kazakhstan (1977) and the Medeu (1971).

=== Attractions ===
==== Churches ====
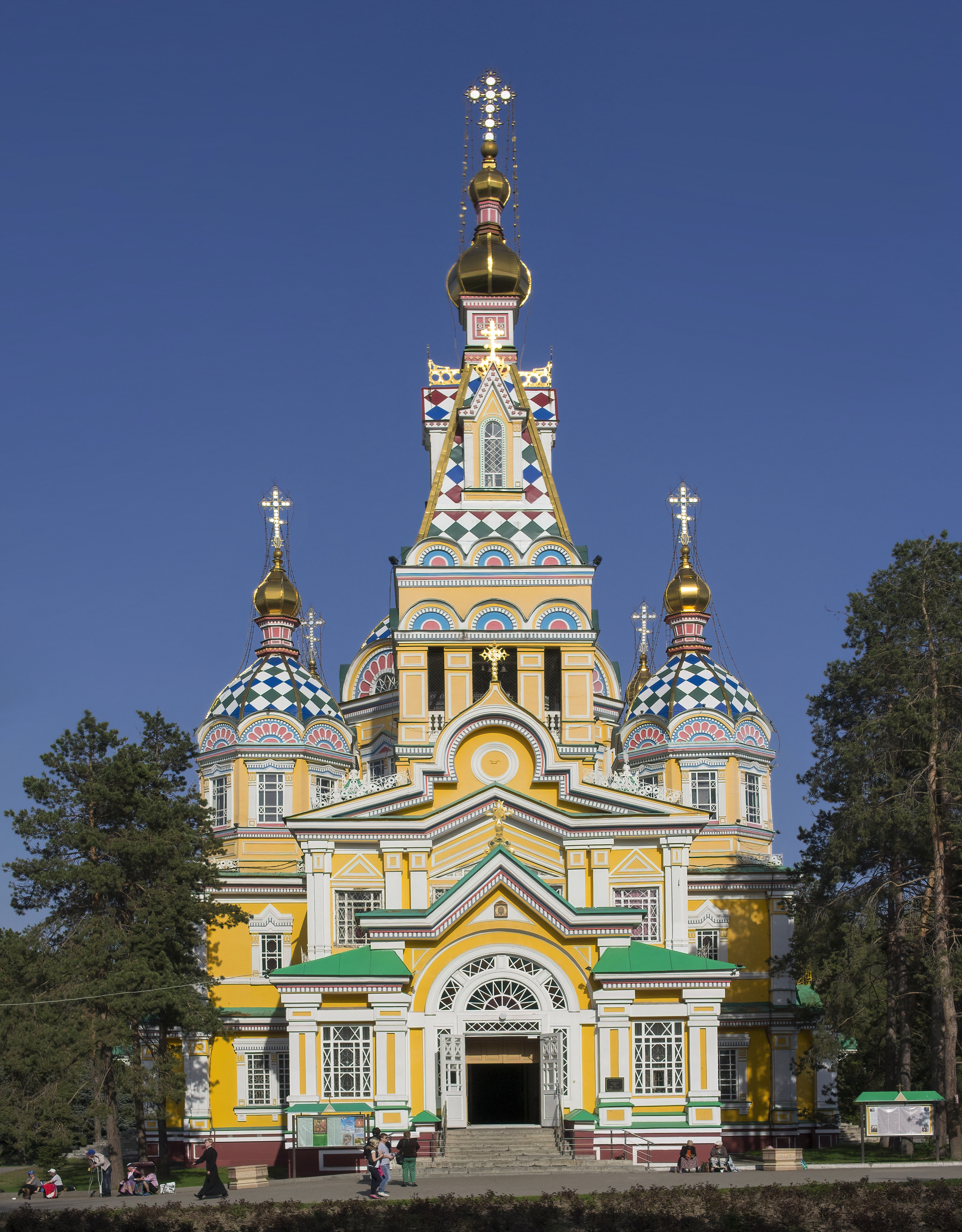
Ascension Cathedral, a 19th-century Russian Orthodox cathedral located in Panfilov Park, is the fourth tallest wooden building in the world.

- St. Sophia Cathedral (Almaty)
- The Ascension Cathedral is a 56 m high earthquake-resistant structure, built by the architect K. A. Borisoglebsky and engineer A. P. Zenkov in 1907 from blue Tien Shan spruce. It withstood an earthquake with a force of 10 points in 1911. The walls of the cathedral were painted by the local artist N. Khludov. During the Soviet period, the building housed a local history museum. In May 1995, the building was transferred to the Almaty and Semipalatinsk Diocese of the Russian Orthodox Church. After two years of restoration work, services were resumed in the church in 1997.

==== Fountains ====
According to the city's Department of Natural Resources and Resource Use Management, as of 2007 the city had 125 fountains. Among them is the "Oriental Calendar" Fountain, whose 12 sculptural figures represent the 12 animals of the Kazakh 12-year animal cycle (similar to its Chinese counterpart).

There are now more than 120 fountains in Almaty, 61 of which are communally owned. Fountains, together with an extensive irrigation ditch network, play a big role in Alma-Ata – together they create a single complex of reservoirs and watercourses of the city. Every year at the end of spring, the city celebrates the "Day of Fountains" holiday where for the first time after winter, all the city's fountains are turned on. In 2006, a new fountain was opened on Lake Sayran. Previously, the highest fountain in the Commonwealth of Independent States (CIS) gushed from this lake – a stream of water 10 cm in diameter reached a height of 50 meters. The fountain has been closed since 2008.

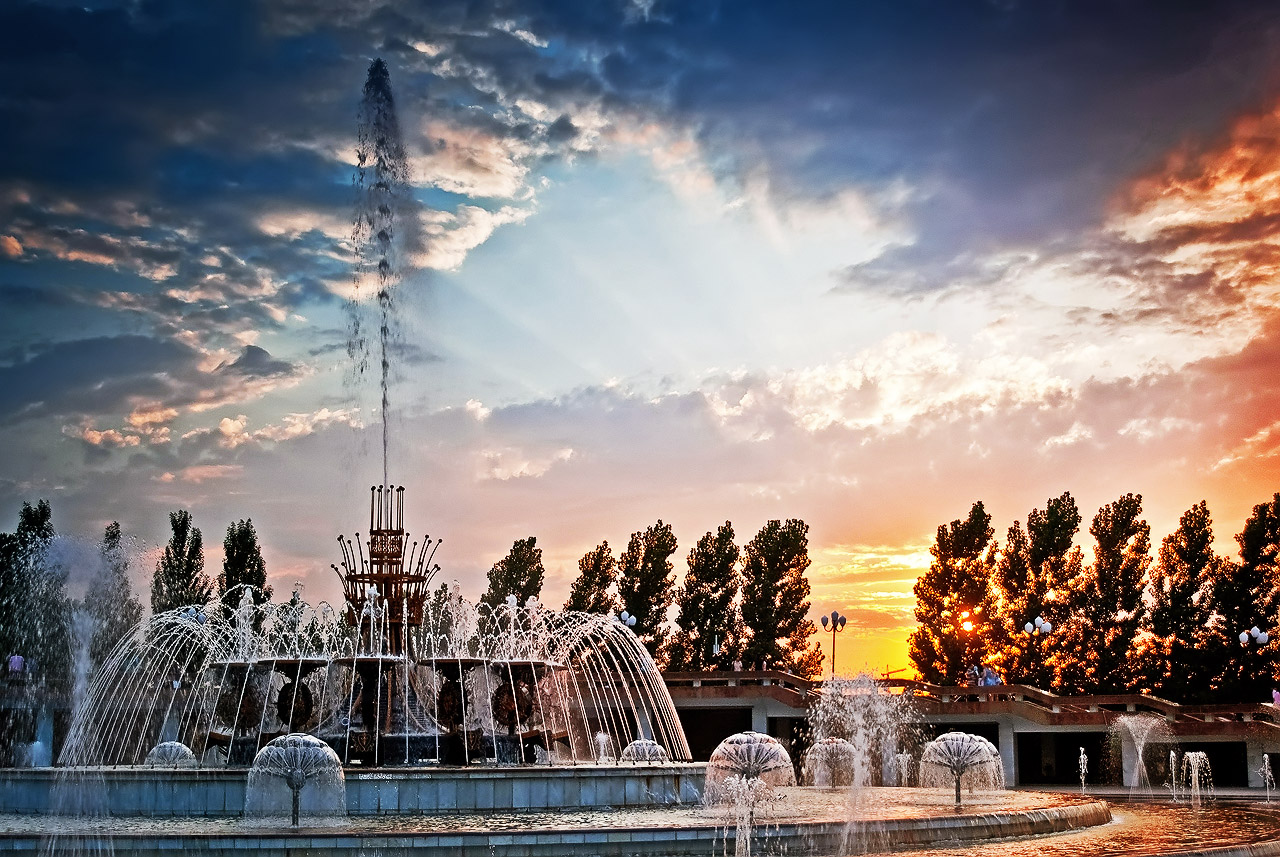
Fountain in First President's Park

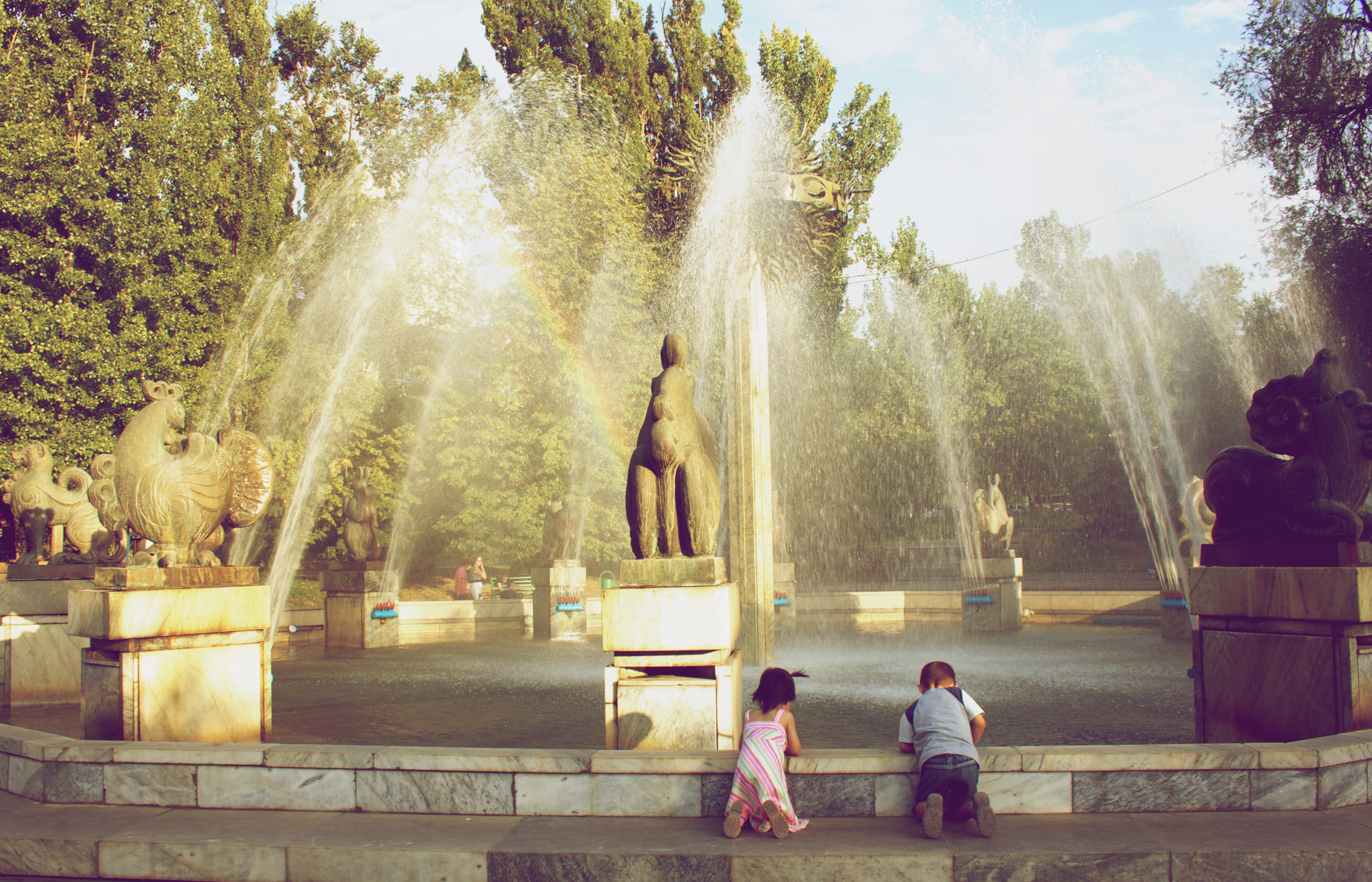
Zodiac Fountain

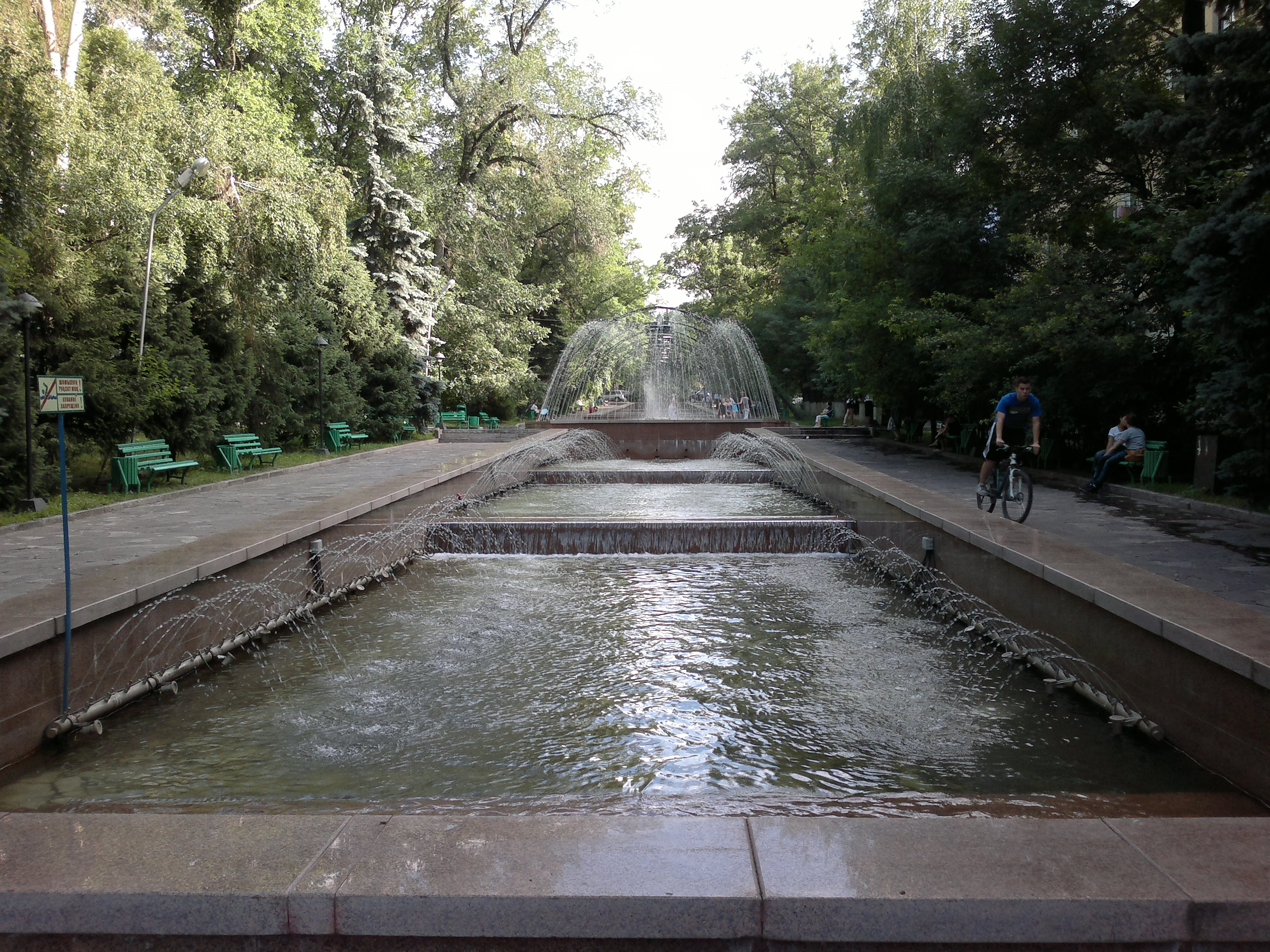
Nedelka Prospect

Fountains in Republic Square

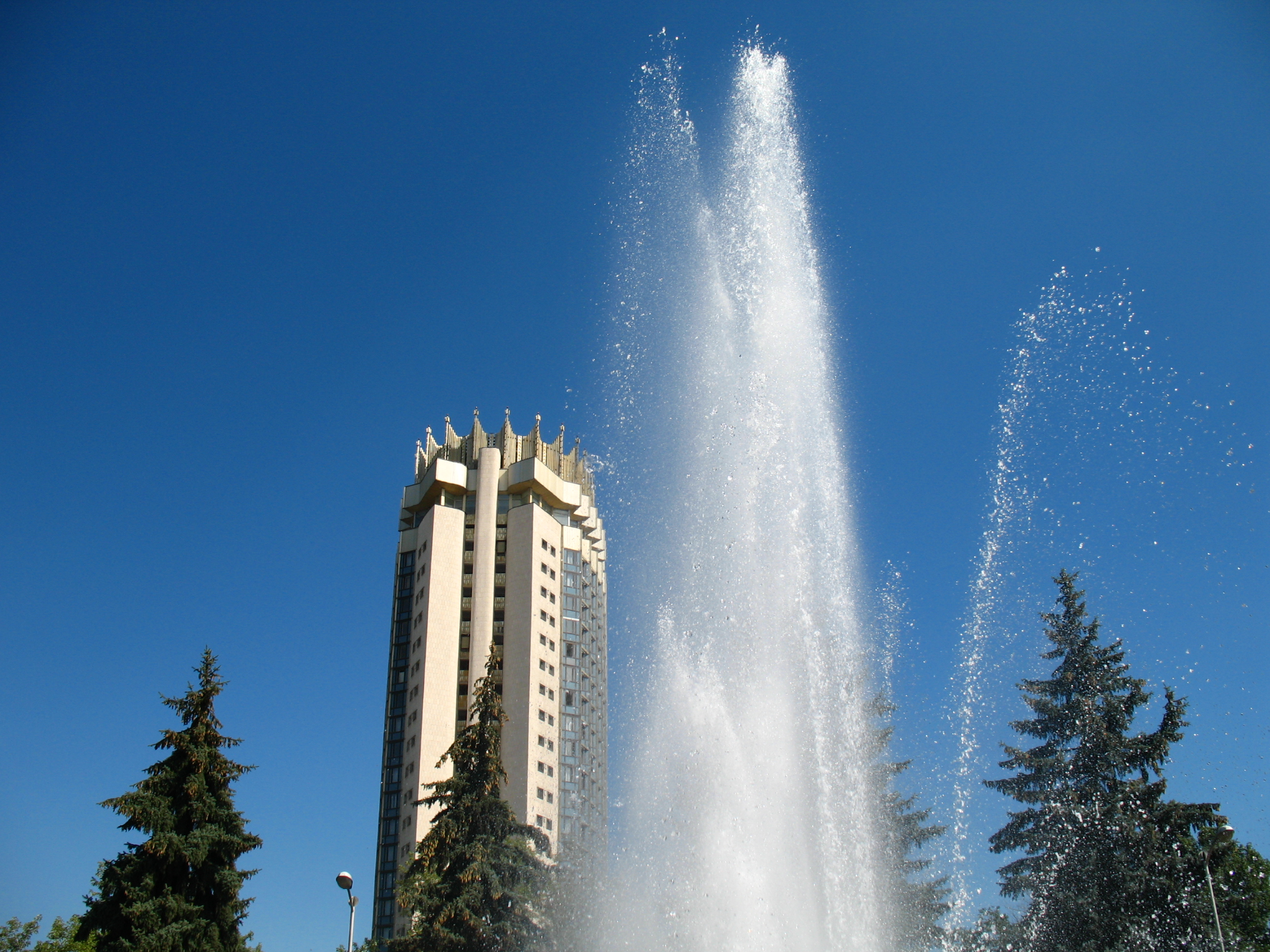
Fountain in Abai Square

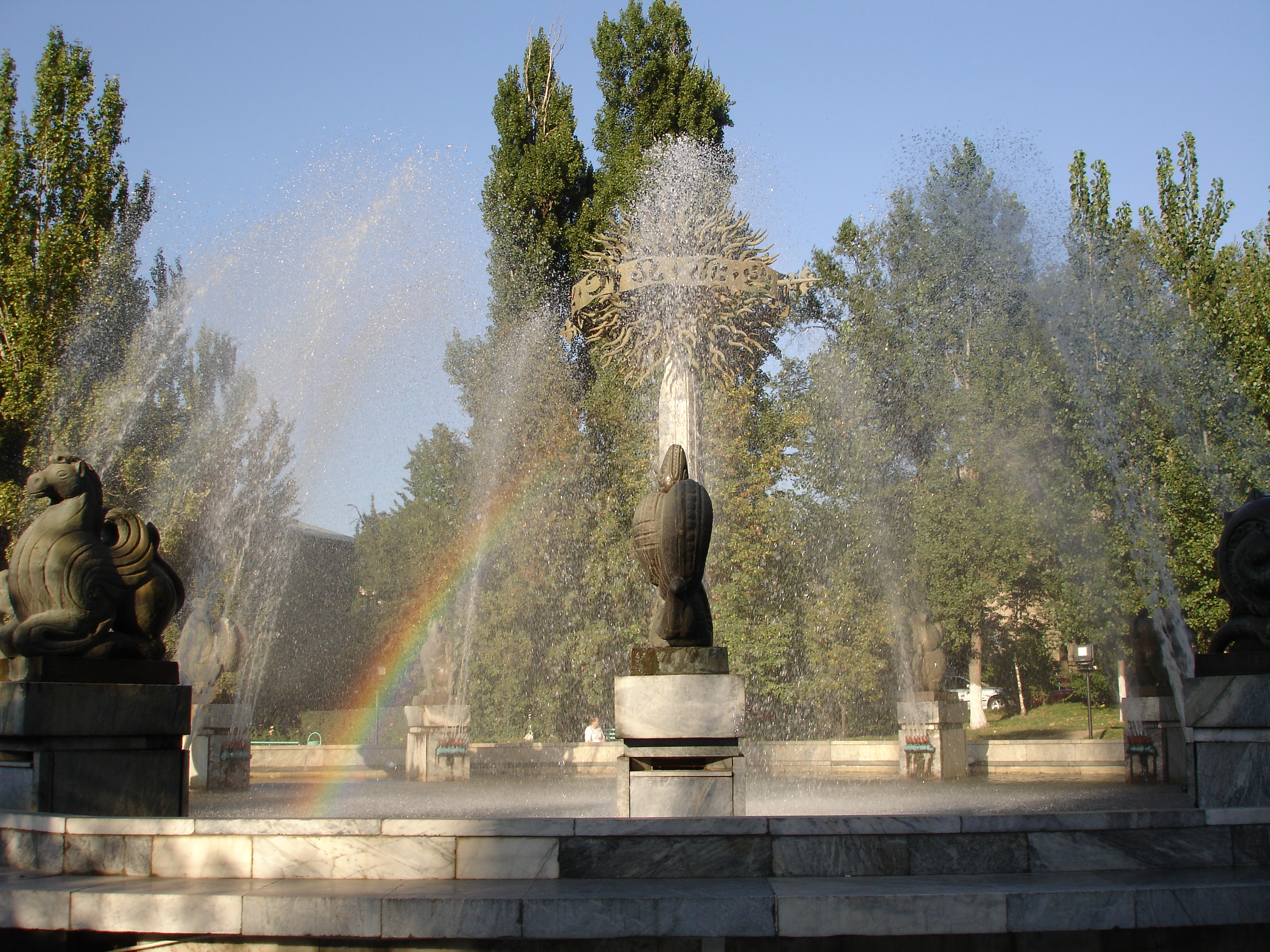
East Fountain

=== Recreation ===
==== Medeu ====
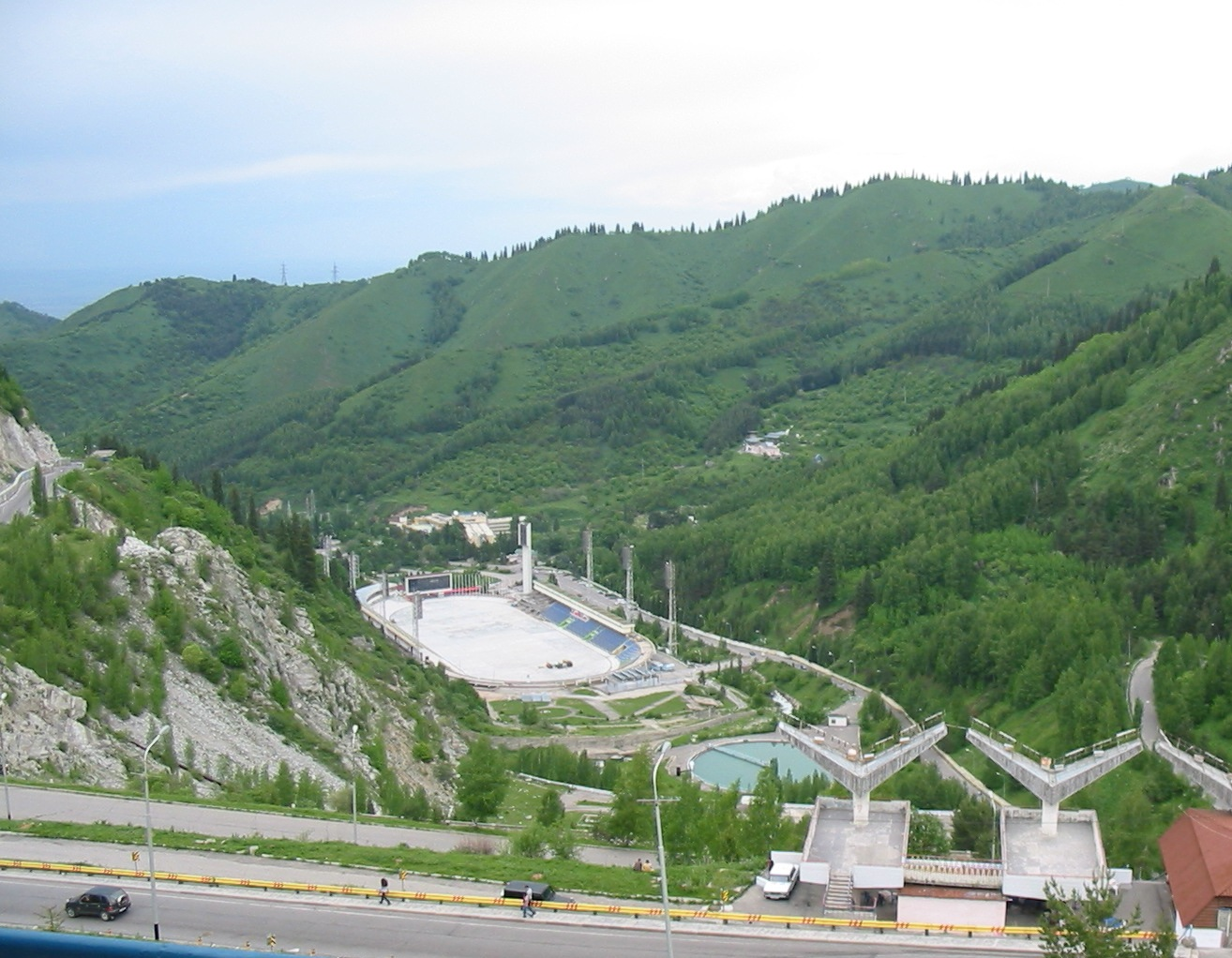
Medeu

The Medeu is an outdoor speed skating and bandy rink. It is located in a mountain valley (Medeu Valley, or the valley of Malaya Alma-Atinka River) on the south-eastern outskirts of Almaty, Kazakhstan. Medeu sits 1,691 metres above sea level, making it one of the highest skating rinks in the world. It has 10,500 square meters of ice and utilizes a sophisticated freezing and watering system to ensure the quality of the ice.

Medeu was re-built in 1972 in the gorge of the same name, 15 km from the city. "Medeo" was called "the factory of records", since 126 world records were set on the ice of a high-mountain skating rink in 33 years. The ice rink, located at an altitude of 1700 m in thin air and high quality ice, is provided by pure mountain water without admixture of salts. In addition, Above the sports complex there is a mudflow protection dam and the Shymbulak. In the 1990s, the Medeu was the venue for the Voice of Asia international music festival (Asia Dauysy).

==== Şymbūlaq ====
Şymbūlaq is a ski resort near Almaty, located in the upper part of the Medeu Valley in the Zailiisky Alatau mountain range, at the elevation of 2,200 metres (7,200 ft) above sea level. The resort area is about 25 kilometres (16 mi) south of Almaty city by the Medeu road. It is popular for its mild climate, a large quantity of sunny days and a great amount of snow through the winter (from November until May). The resort offers both day and night skiing. The ski resort also hold a Guinness world record for the worlds highest ski slope available for night skiing.

==== Big Almaty Lake ====
Big Almaty Lake is a natural lake located in Trans-Ili Alatau mountains on 2511 above the sea level near Almaty (15 km South from Almaty). Like a majority of lakes in Trans-Ili Alatau, this lake formed as the result of an earthquake. The lake is a major source of drinking water for the region. People can access the lake by car (approximately 1 hour drive from the city center), bike, or hiking (approximately a half-day trip).

==== First President's Park ====
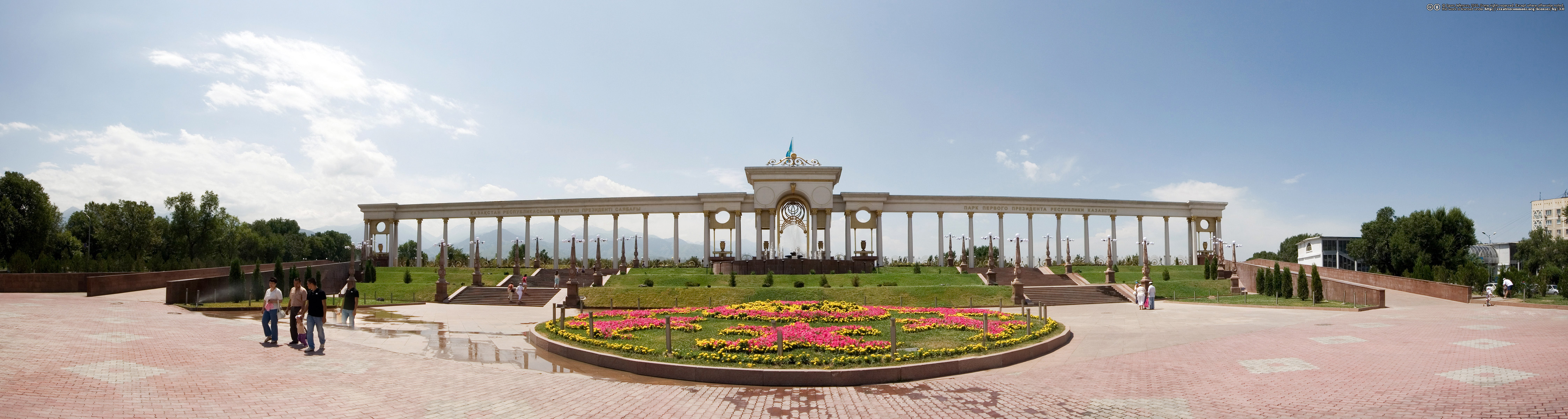
Entrance to the First President's Park, 2010

The First President's Park is an urban park located in Almaty at the intersection of Navoi Street and Al-Farabi Avenue in the Bostandyq District. The park was opened in July 2010.

Creation of the park began in 2001. The park is broken into three main areas–the avenue, boulevard, and dendrological areas. Greenery was planted according to dendrological plan. In honor of the participation of the city of Almaty in the Olympic torch relay of the Beijing Olympic Games, approximately one hundred spruces and birches were planted. In 2011, a hundred Tien-Shan spruces were also planted. Plans include a set of water projects over an area of 9.5 hectares.

==== Kok Tobe Tower ====
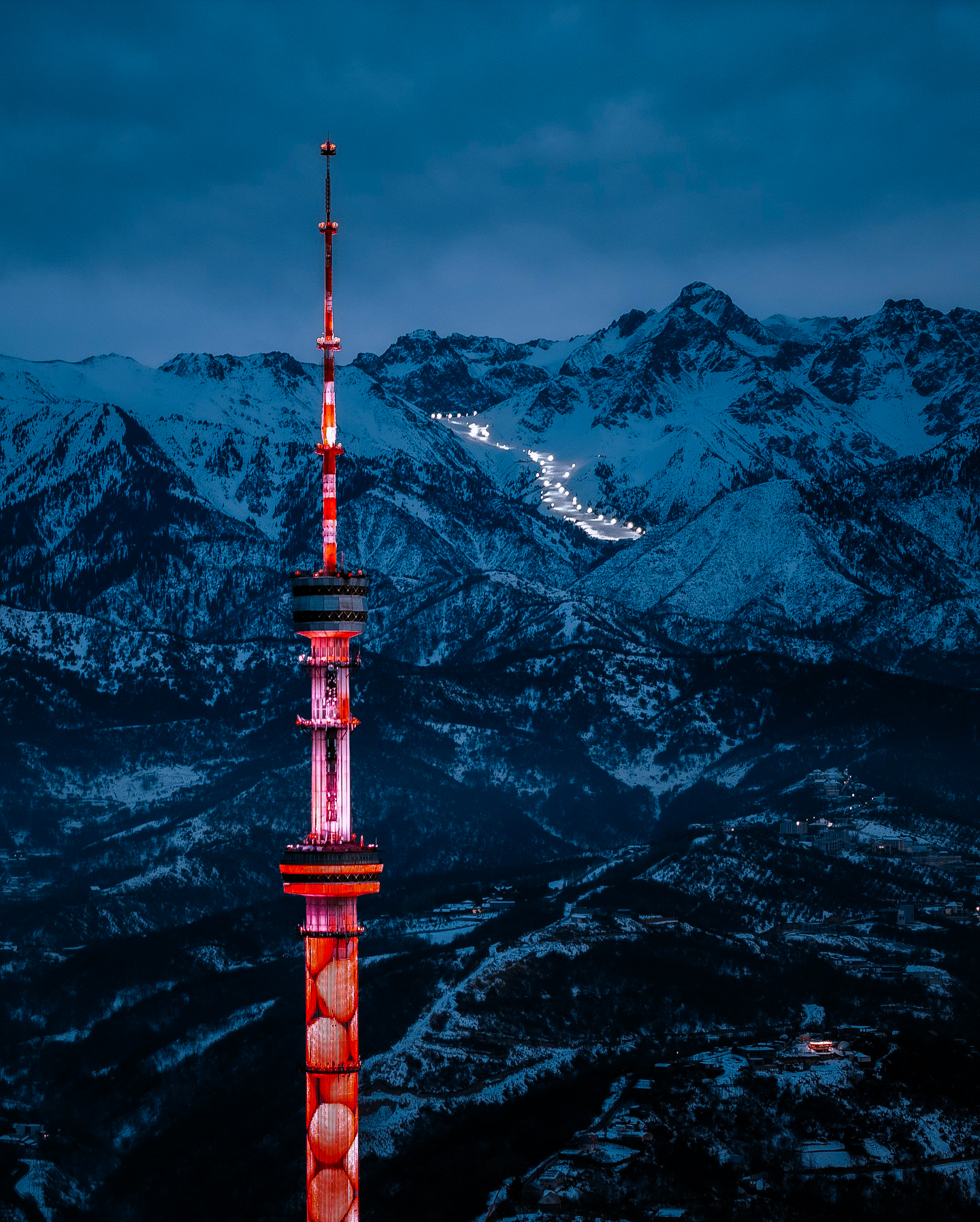
Almaty Tower

An aerial tramway line connects Almaty with a popular recreation area at the top of Kök Töbe (Kazakh: Көк-төбе, which means 'Blue Hill'), a mountain just to the southeast.

The city television tower, Almaty Tower, is located on the hill. It was built in between 1978 and 1983, and is 371.5 m tall. The TV tower, located at an altitude of 1000 m above sea level, is the tallest structure in Almaty. Its height is almost 372 m, and it sits at an elevation of 1130 m. The base of the tower is a reinforced concrete foundation in the form of a three-storey sectional basement. The barrel of the tower is a metal stepped hexahedron with a diameter of 18 m at the base, 13 and 9 m at the locations of maintenance services at heights of 146 and 252 m. The structure was built taking into account the seismic mountainous terrain and can withstand an earthquake of up to 10 points. The television tower is a complex of an operating radio and television transmitting station with a special mode of operation, therefore it is inaccessible for sightseeing tours of the city from a height. The tower, illuminated at night by powerful searchlights, is visible from almost anywhere in the city.

==== Park of 28 Panfilov Guardsmen ====
The Park of 28 Panfilov Guardsmen is a major park in Almaty, Kazakhstan. The park is located in east-central Almaty in the area surrounding Zenkov Cathedral. It is dedicated to and named after the Panfilov Heroes, 28 soldiers of an Almaty infantry unit who died fighting Nazi German invaders outside of Moscow in World War II. The group takes its name from Ivan Panfilov, the General commanding the 316th division which, in spite of heavy casualties, believed at that time managed to delay the Germans' advance on the capital, buying time for the defenders of the city. An eternal flame commemorating the fallen of the Russian Civil War and the Great Patriotic War burns in front of the giant black monument of soldiers from all 15 Soviet republics.

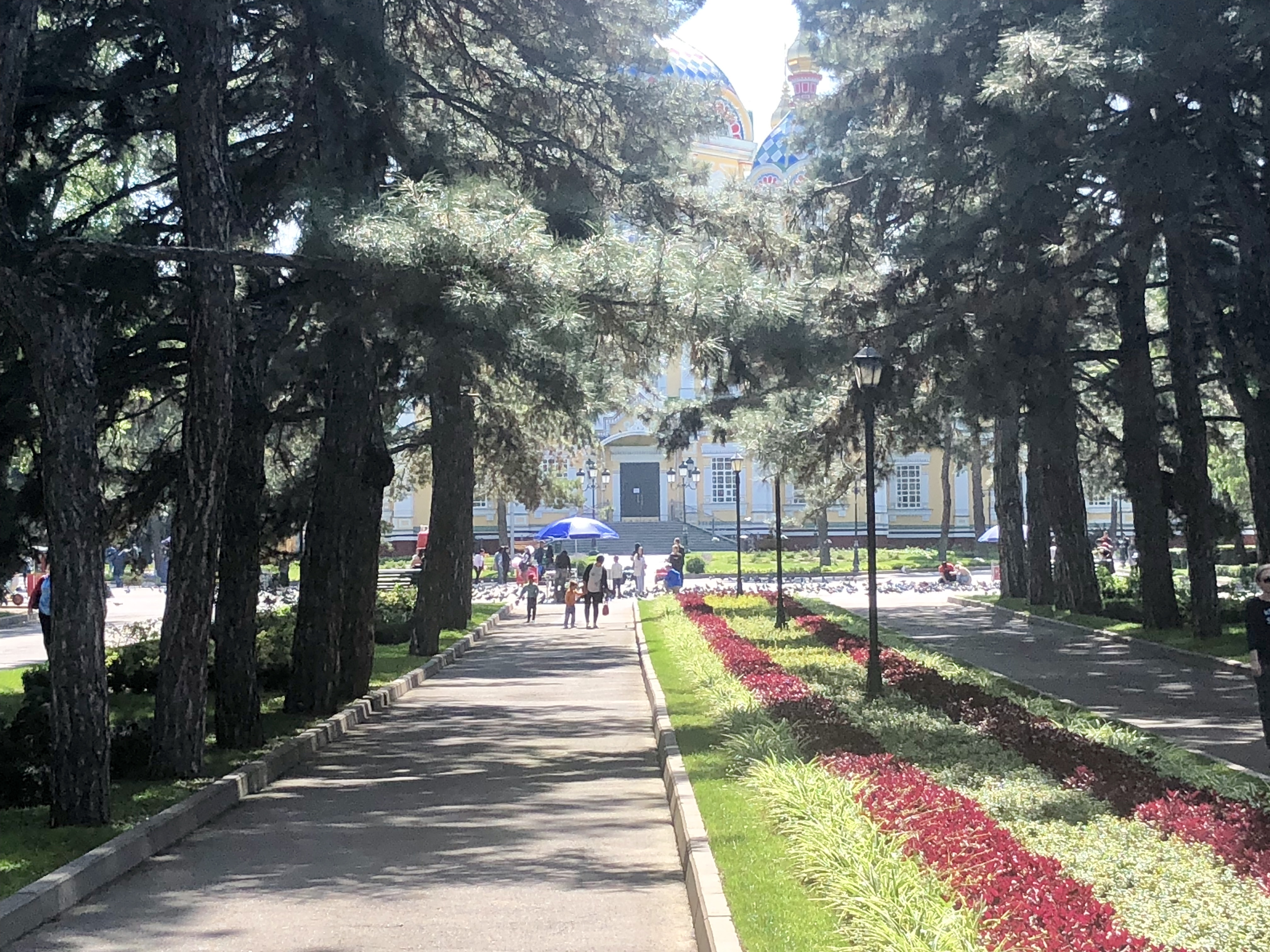
Panfilov Park

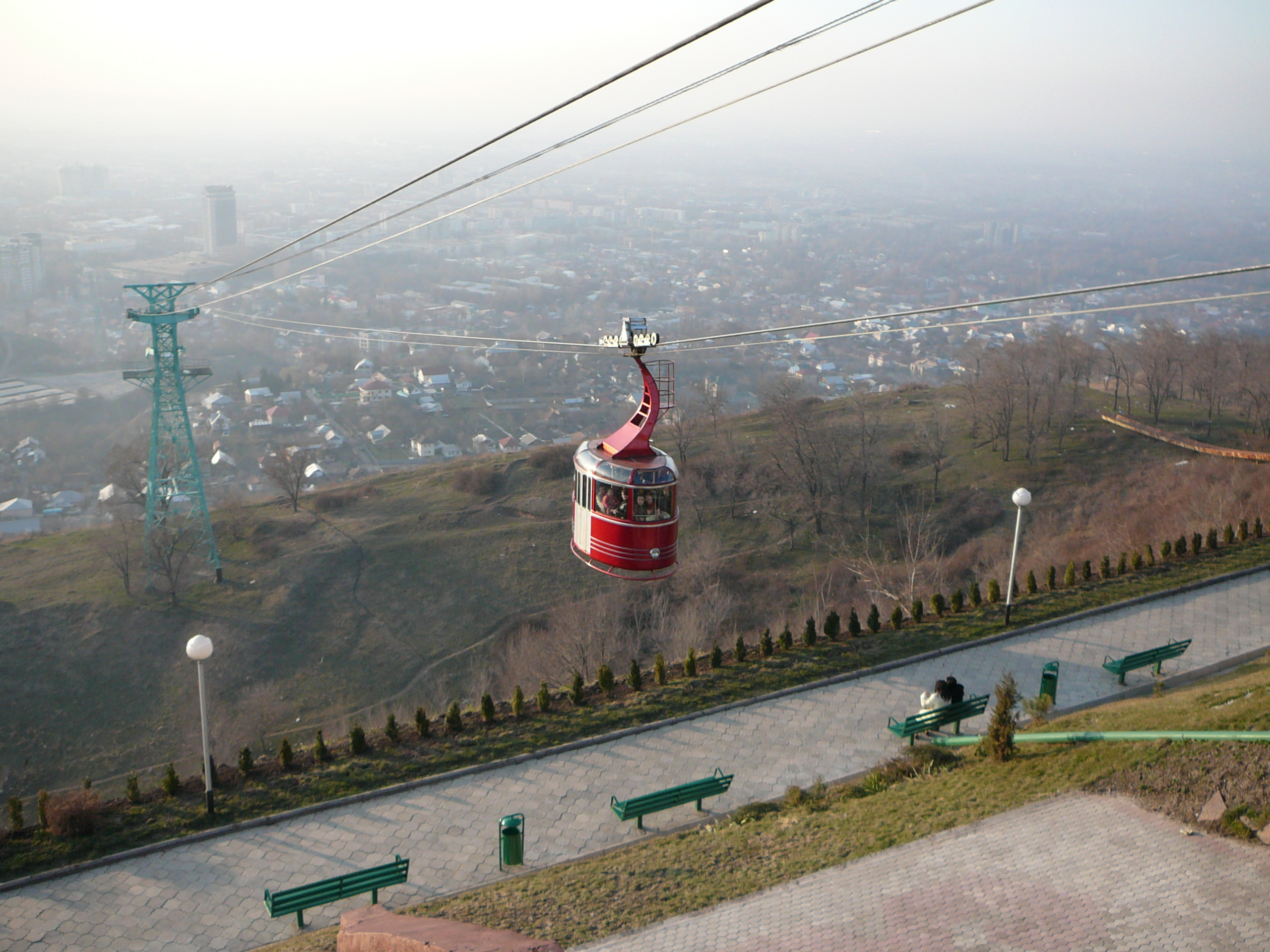
Kök Töbe cable car, 2007

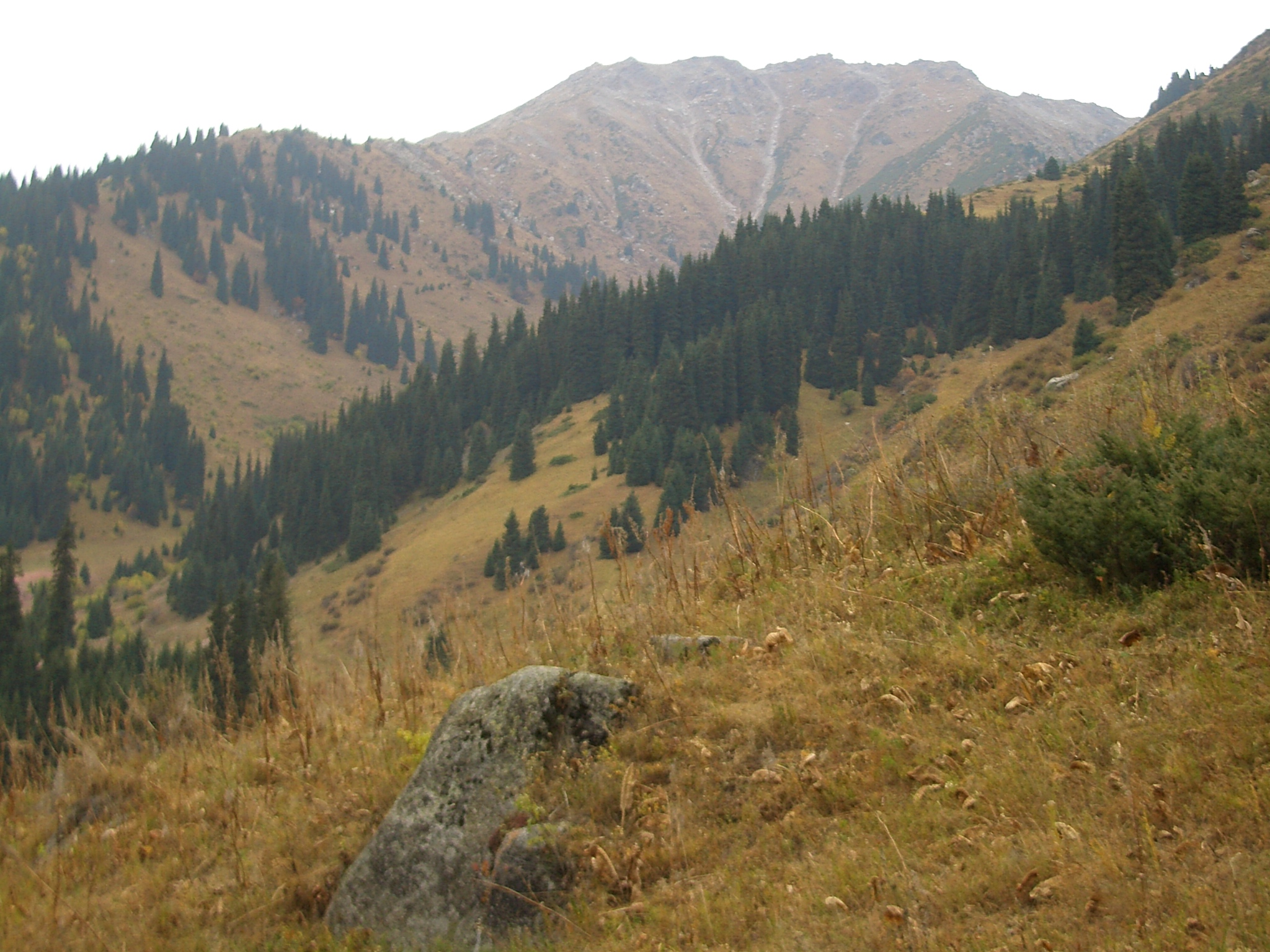
Shymbulak Valley

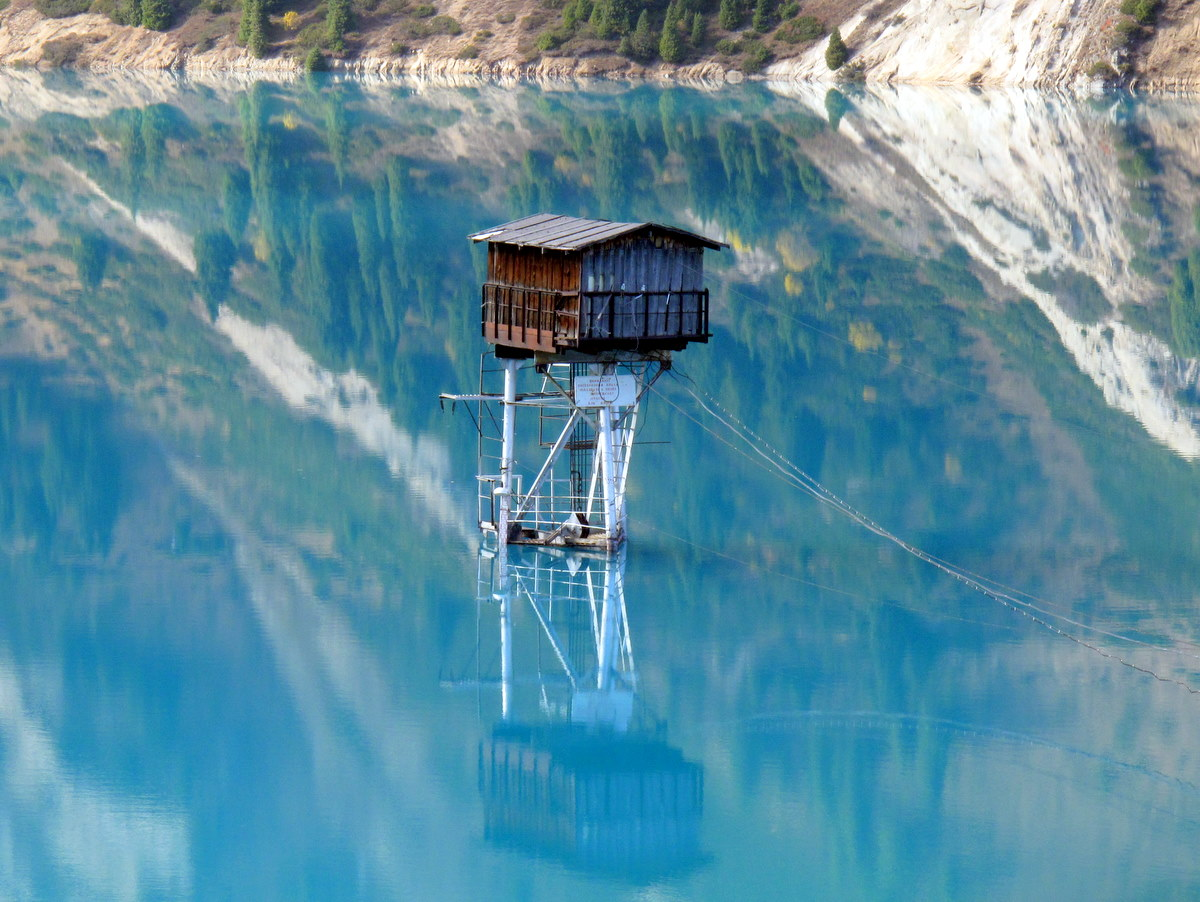
Watchtower in middle of Big Almaty Lake

== Transportation ==
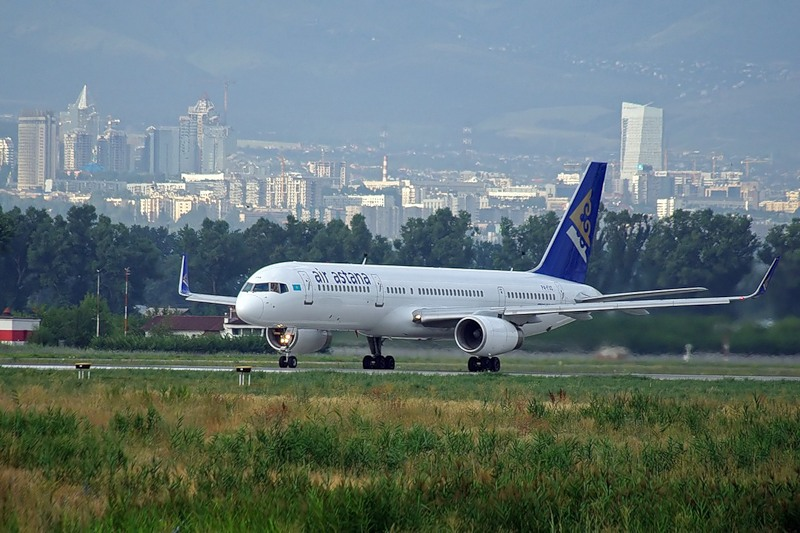
Almaty International Airport is the largest airport in Kazakhstan.

=== Air ===
The closest airport to Almaty is Almaty International Airport located 15 kilometres (9 1/2 mi) northeast of the city centre.

=== Urban transport ===
Sayran Bus Terminal provides intercity bus connections within Kazakhstan, as well as international connections to Kyrgyzstan and China and regional bus connections west of the city. Sayakhat Bus Terminal provides regional bus connections to places north and east of the city.

Kazakhstan Temir Joly has two stations: Almaty-1 (located 20 minutes drive from the city center, and reserved mostly for cargo) and Almaty-2 located within the city and reserved for passengers. In 2011 the Almaty Metro opened, and a light rail line was built in 2011.

A bicycle-sharing system, Almaty-bike, has been in operation since September 2016. People can buy a monthly card and ride freely.

== Education ==
=== Universities ===
- Kazakh National Medical University, named after Asfendiyarov (former: Almaty Governmental Medical Institute (AGMI))
- Almaty Management University (ALMU)
- International Information Technology University (IITU)
- Kazakh-British Technical University (KBTU)
- University of International Business
- Almaty Institute of Power Engineering and Telecommunications
- Kazakh National Technical University (KazNTU)
- Al-Farabi Kazakh National University (KazNU)
- Suleyman Demirel University (SDU)
- KIMEP University (KIMEP)
- Kazakh-American University (KAU)
- Kazakh National Academy of Arts named by T.Zhurgenov
- Kazakh Academy of Sciences
- Kazakh Academy of Labour and Social Relations
- Kazakh National Pedagogic University (named after Abay)
- Turan University
- Kazakh Ablai Khan University of International Relations and World Languages
- Central Asian University (ЦАУ)
- Kazakh-German University (КНУ)
- Kazakh Leading Academy of Architecture and Civil Engineering
- Kazakh National Agrarian University (SHI, AEZVI)
- Narxoz University
- International Business Academy

== Sport ==
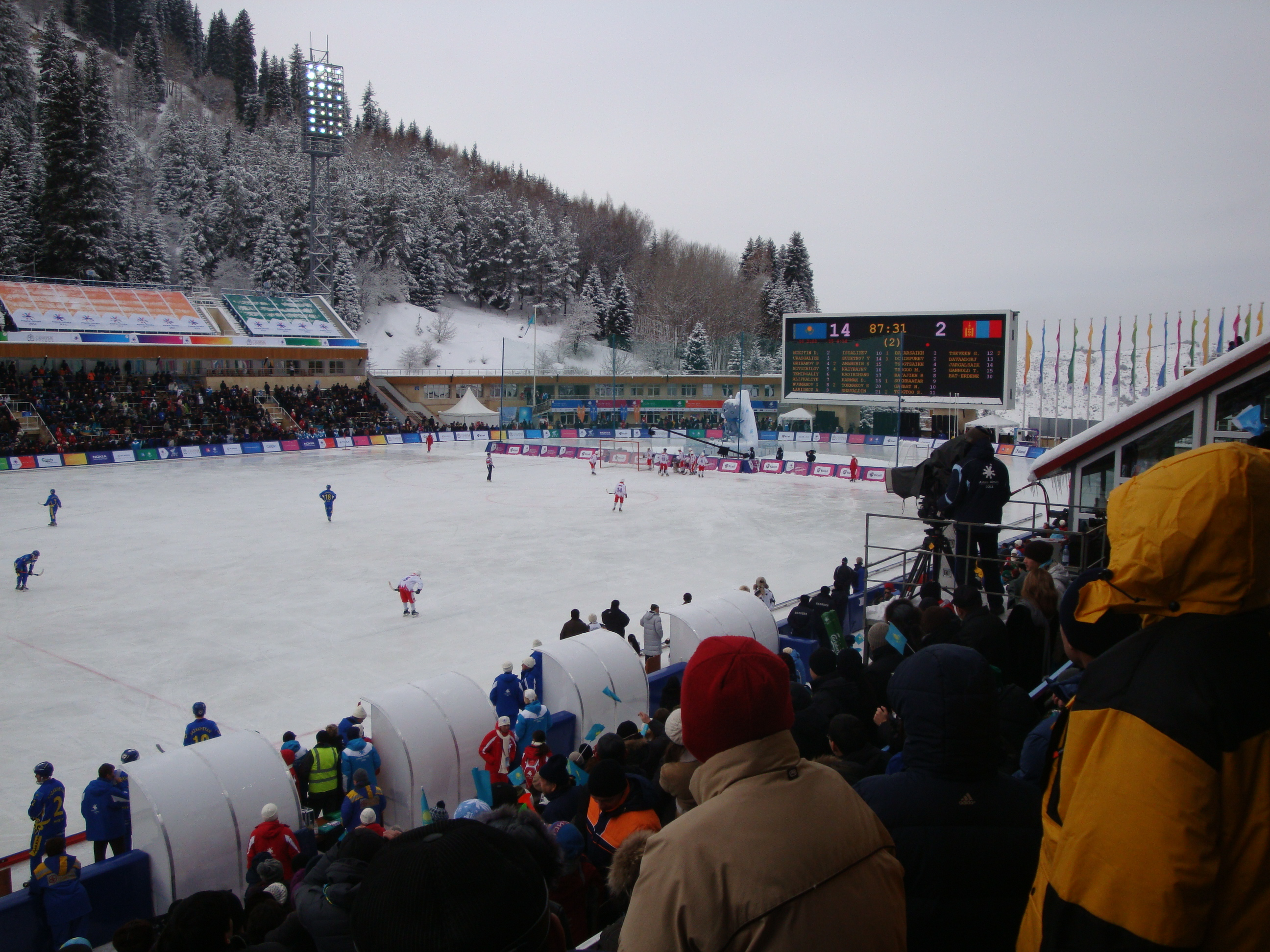
The final of the bandy tournament at the 2011 Asian Winter Games between Kazakhstan and Mongolia

The historic bandy team Dinamo won the Soviet Championships in 1977 and 1990 and the European Cup in 1978. Their home ground was Medeu. Bandy was introduced for the first time at the 2011 Winter Asian Games. Medeu was the main arena at the 2012 Bandy World Championship. The second arena built for the championships is an alternative field at Almaty Central Stadium. The city is now a candidate to host also the 2020 Bandy World Championship. The Federation of International Bandy has opened an office for Asia, which is located in Almaty.

Almaty was the host of the 2017 Winter Universiade with bandy on the programme.

The 2011 Asian Winter Games were held jointly in Almaty and Astana. The ice hockey and ski jumping competitions were held in the city at the Baluan Sholak Sports Palace and Sunkar International Ski Jumping Complex respectively. The biathlon, cross-country skiing, and ski orienteering competitions were held at the nearby Soldatskoe Valley Cross Country Skiing and Biathlon Stadium; the Alpine skiing and bandy competitions were held in nearby Shymbulak and Medeo respectively.

The Yenbek Almaty ice hockey team played from 1965 to 1985 and from 1999 to 2009. HC Almaty plays in the Kazakhstan Hockey Championship.

The city's primary football team is FC Kairat founded in 1954 and one of the most successful Kazakh clubs. The club made history by qualifying for the 2025-26 UEFA Champions League, thus becoming only the second Kazakhstani football club to do so. Futsal club AFC Kairat has won the UEFA Futsal Cup in 2012–13 and 2014–15. Basketball team BC Almaty won the 2015 and 2016 editions of the Kazakhstan Basketball Cup.

=== Olympic aspirations ===
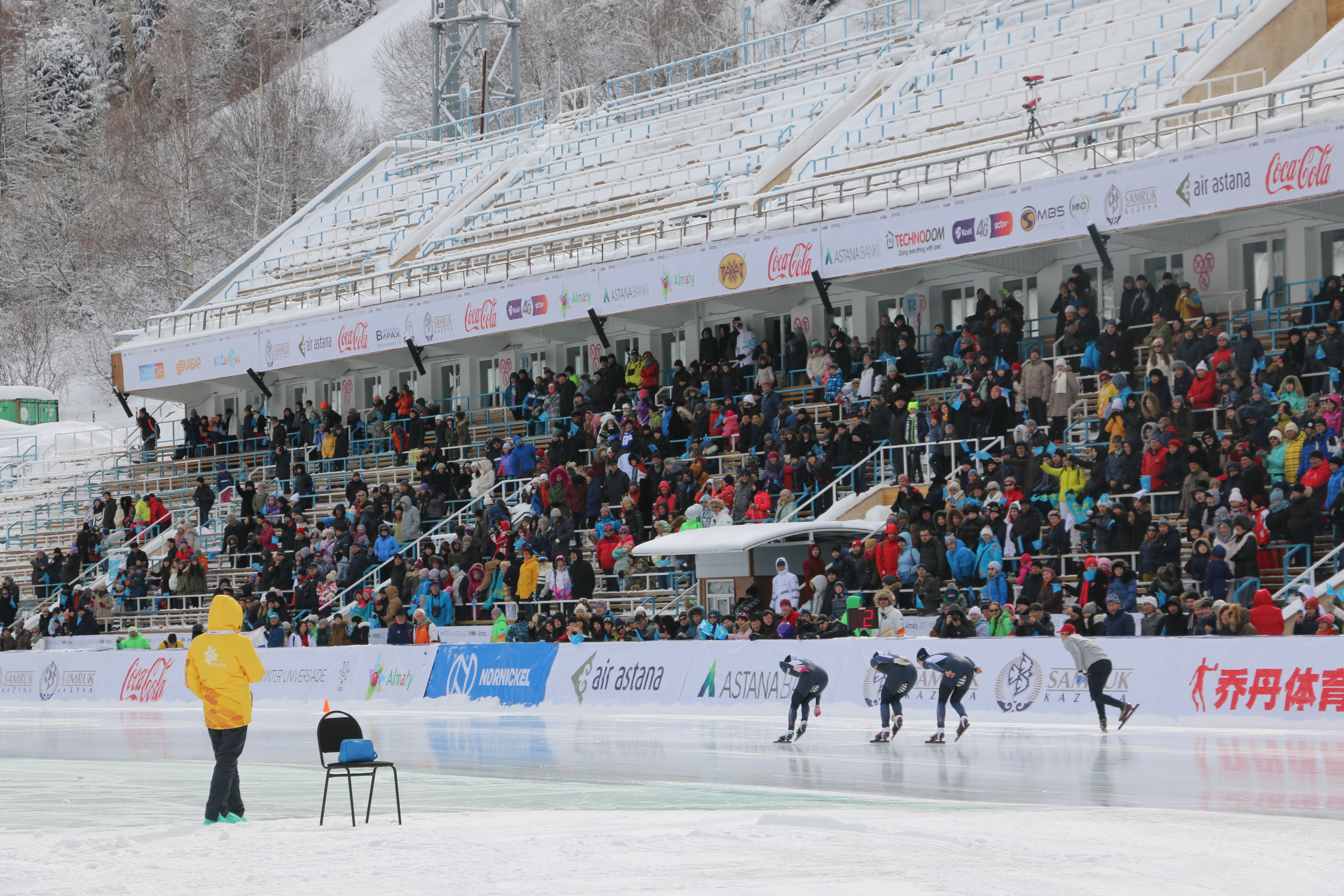
2017 Winter Universiade

Following the successful hosting of the 2011 Winter Asian Games, Almaty made a bid to host the XXII Olympic Winter Games in 2014, but was eliminated from consideration, not making the "short list" of candidate cities. Almaty was the 2017 Winter Universiade host. The city was exploring possible bids, such as the 2018 Winter Olympics, but did not submit one. Almaty submitted a bid to host the 2022 Winter Olympics in August 2013, but lost to Beijing. Almaty may still consider to submit a bid to host the 2030 Winter Olympics.

== In popular culture ==
The fictional espionage novel Performance Anomalies takes place in Almaty, Kazakhstan and many of the city's landmarks make an appearance, including Panfilov Park, Zenkov Cathedral, The Kazakh Museum of Folk Musical Instruments, Kok-Tob (Kök Töbe), Shymbulak, Zelyony Bazaar, and several well-known avenues.

The city also features in Civilization V as a militaristic city state.

== Notable people ==
- Zhansaya Abdumalik (born 2000), chess Grandmaster and prodigy
- Altynai Asylmuratova (born 1961), prima ballerina with the Kirov ballet
- Eugen Bauder (born 1986), model in Germany
- Anatoly Bose (born 1988), Australian basketball player
- Alexander Brener (born 1957), film star in Russia
- Sergei Chekmezov (born 1964), professional football coach and former player
- Zarina Diyas (born 1993), tennis player
- Alexandra Elbakyan (born 1988), intellectual property activist, creator of Sci-Hub
- Nagima Eskalieva (born 1954), singer and entertainer
- Dmitri Fofonov (born 1976), racing cyclist
- Kinbōzan Haruki (born 1997), sumo wrestler and first Kazakhstani to reach the makuuchi division
- Ilya Ivanovich Ivanov (1870–1932), biologist, expert in artificial insemination
- Jamila Jaxaliyeva (born 1990), Kazakhstan's first professional golfer
- Alexey Korolev (born 1987), ski jumper
- Nikolay Karpenko (born 1981), ski jumper
- Ruslana Korshunova (1987–2008), model
- Olessya Kulakova (born 1977), volleyball representative for Germany
- Regina Kulikova (born 1989), tennis player
- Dinmukhamed Konayev (1912–1993), politician
- Fuat Mansurov (1928–2008), Soviet and Russian conductor
- Dmitriy Ogai (born 1960), soccer trainer and Soviet soccer player
- Sergei Ostapenko (born 1986), soccer player
- Alexander Parygin (born 1973), olympic athlete
- Alexander Petrenko (1976–2006), basketball representative for Russia
- Boris Polak (born 1954), Israeli world champion and Olympic sport shooter
- Vadim Sayutin (born 1970), ice speed skater in Russia
- Thomas Schertwitis (born 1972), water polo
- Levi Yitzchak Schneerson (1878–1944) Chabad-Lubavitch Hasidic rabbi
- Zhanar Sekerbayeva (born 1983), LGBT activist
- Olga Shishigina (born 1968), Olympic champion in hurdling
- Konstantin Sokolenko (born 1987), Nordic combined skier/ski jumper
- Igor Sysoev (born 1970) open-source software engineer, founder of nginx, Inc.
- Elena Likhovtseva (born 1975), tennis player
- Elzhana Taniyeva (born 2005), rhythmic gymnast
- Denis Ten (1993–2018), figure skater
- Yernar Yerimbetov (1980), gymnast
- Anatoly Vaisser (born 1949), French chess grandmaster
- Sofya Velikaya (born 1985), Russian Olympic fencer
- Radik Zhaparov (born 1984), ski jumper
- Vladimir Zhirinovsky (1946–2022), politician
- Elena Zoubareva (born 1972), Russian American opera singer

== Twin towns – sister cities ==
Almaty is twinned with:

- Alexandria, Egypt
- Bishkek, Kyrgyzstan
- Daegu, South Korea
- Istanbul, Turkey
- Jeddah, Saudi Arabia
- Malatya, Turkey
- Modena, Italy
- Mogadishu, Somalia
- Moscow, Russia
- Rennes, France
- Riga, Latvia
- Rosario, Argentina
- Saint Petersburg, Russia
- Tashkent, Uzbekistan
- Tel Aviv, Israel
- Tucson, Arizona, United States
- Ürümqi, China
- Muş, Turkey
- Vilnius, Lithuania

== Gallery ==
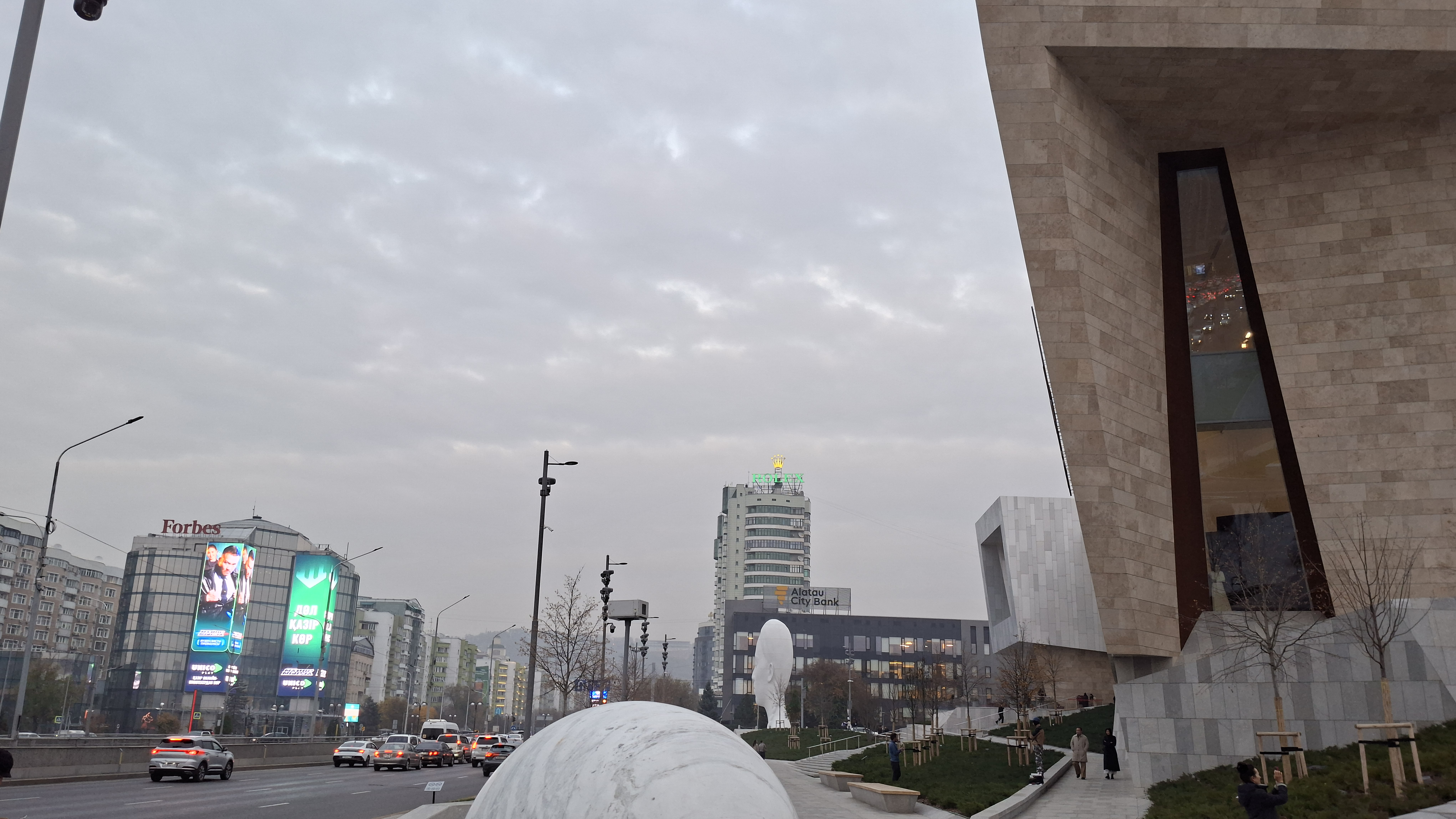
A modern Almaty street

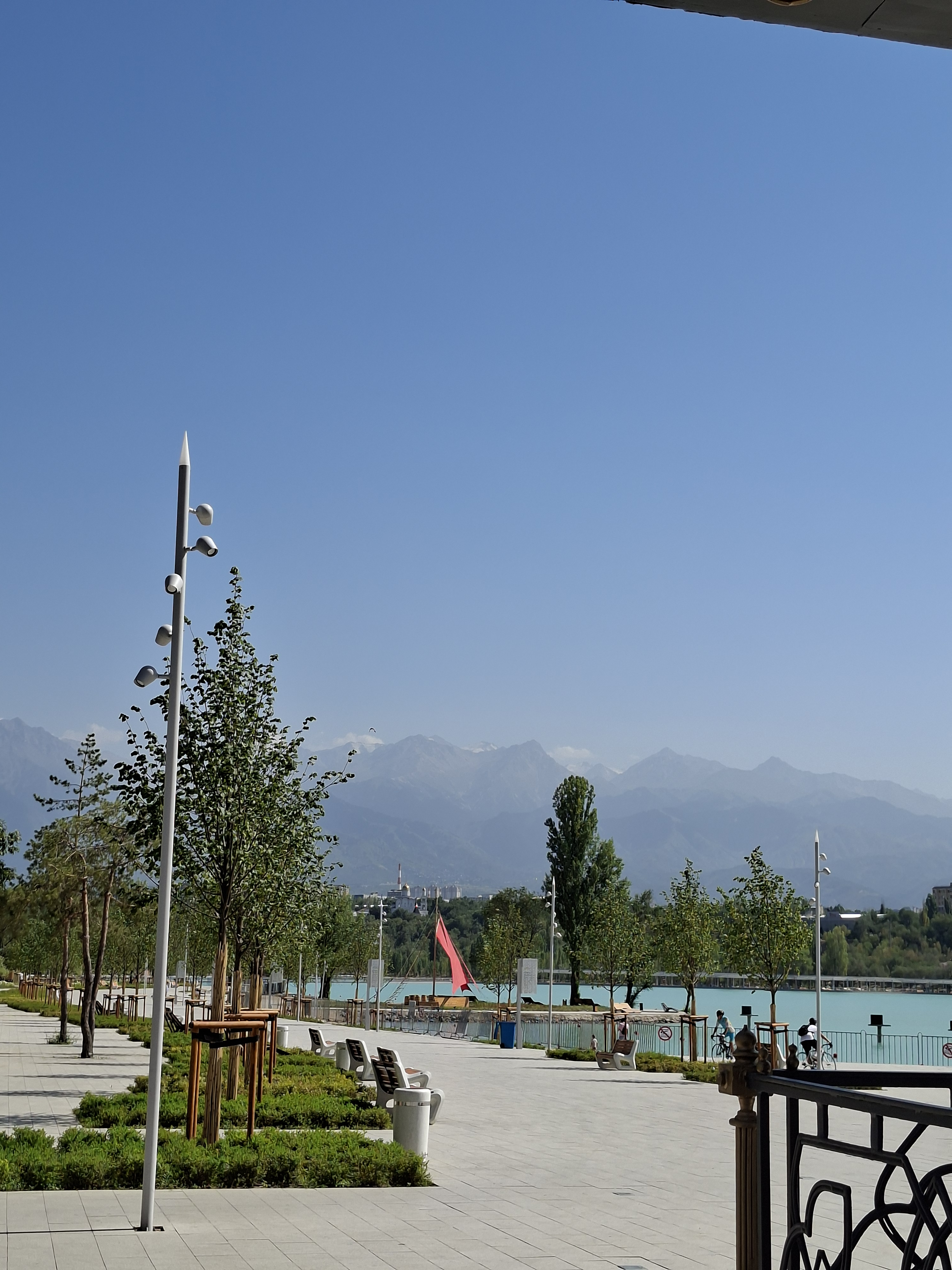
Lake Sayran, on the western side of the city

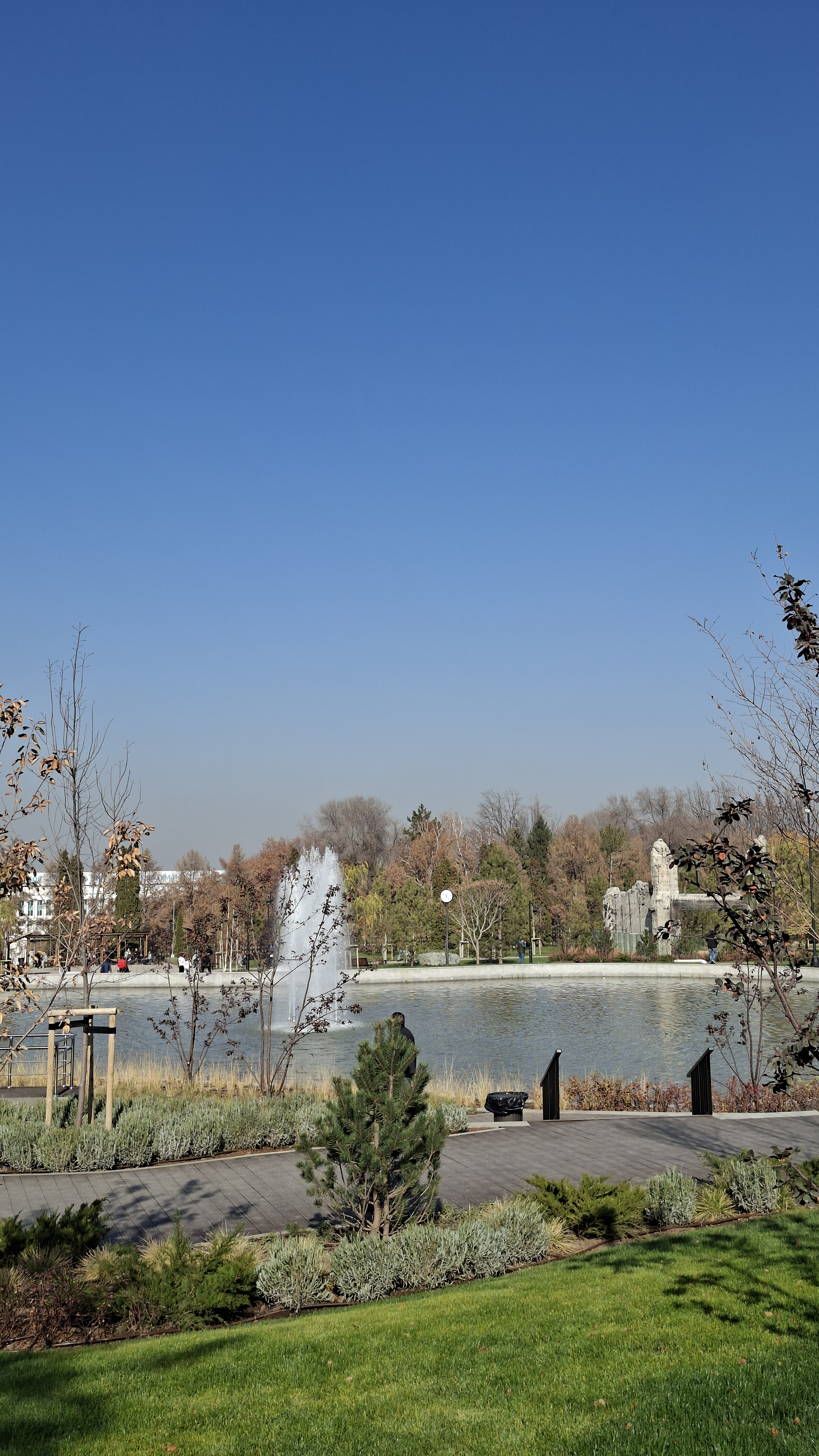
Downtown Park

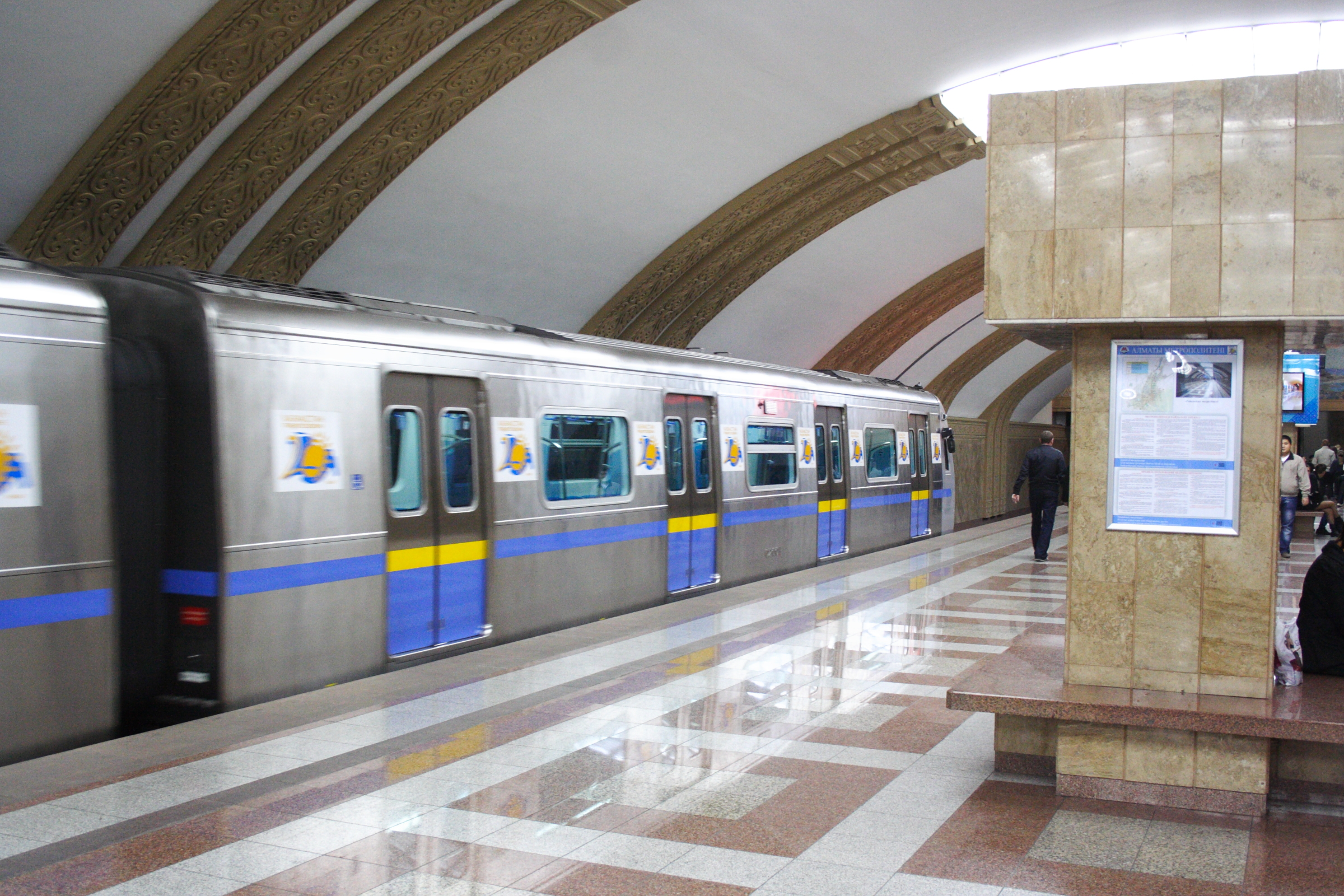
Raymbek batyr Station, Almaty Metro

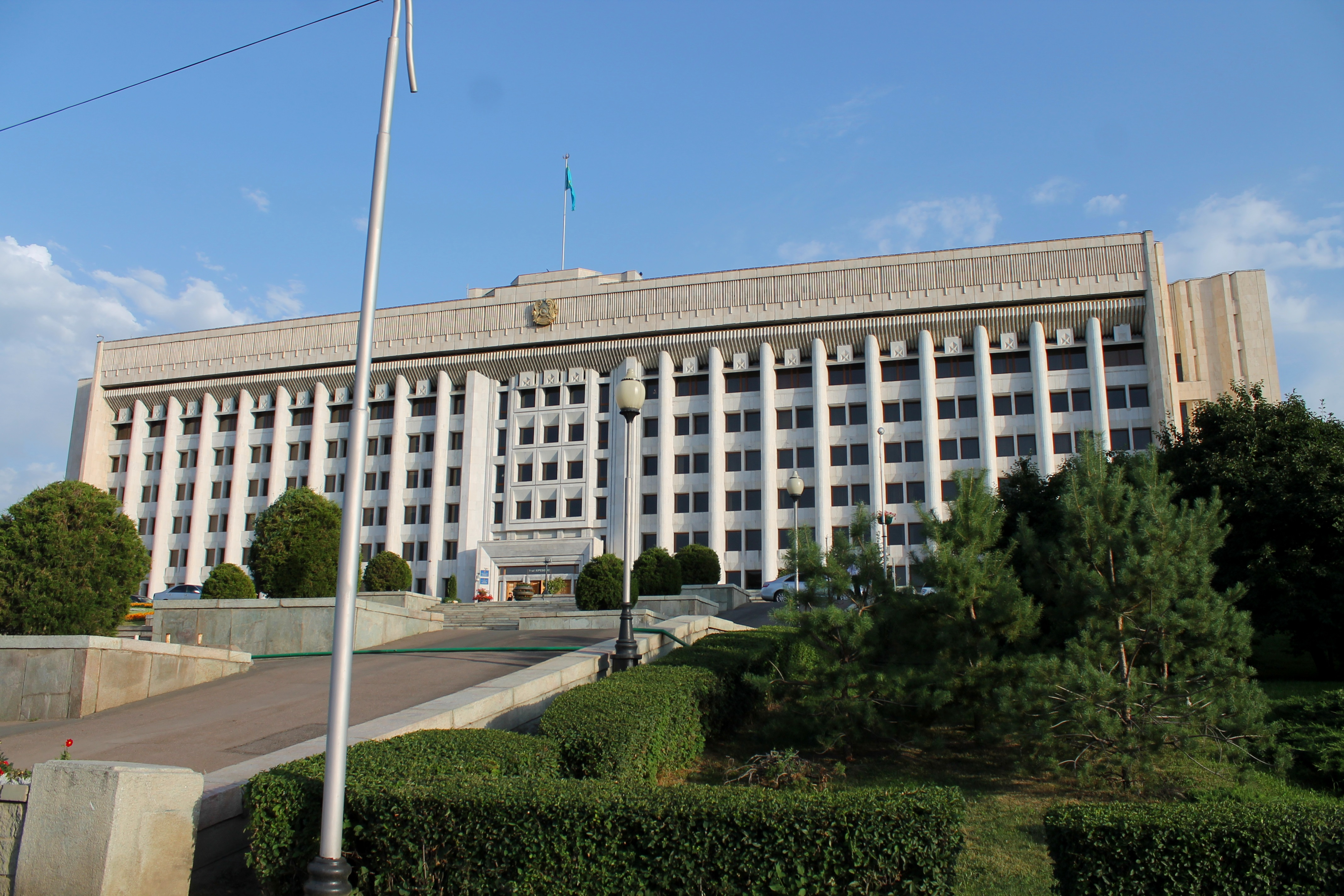
Town Hall on Republic Square

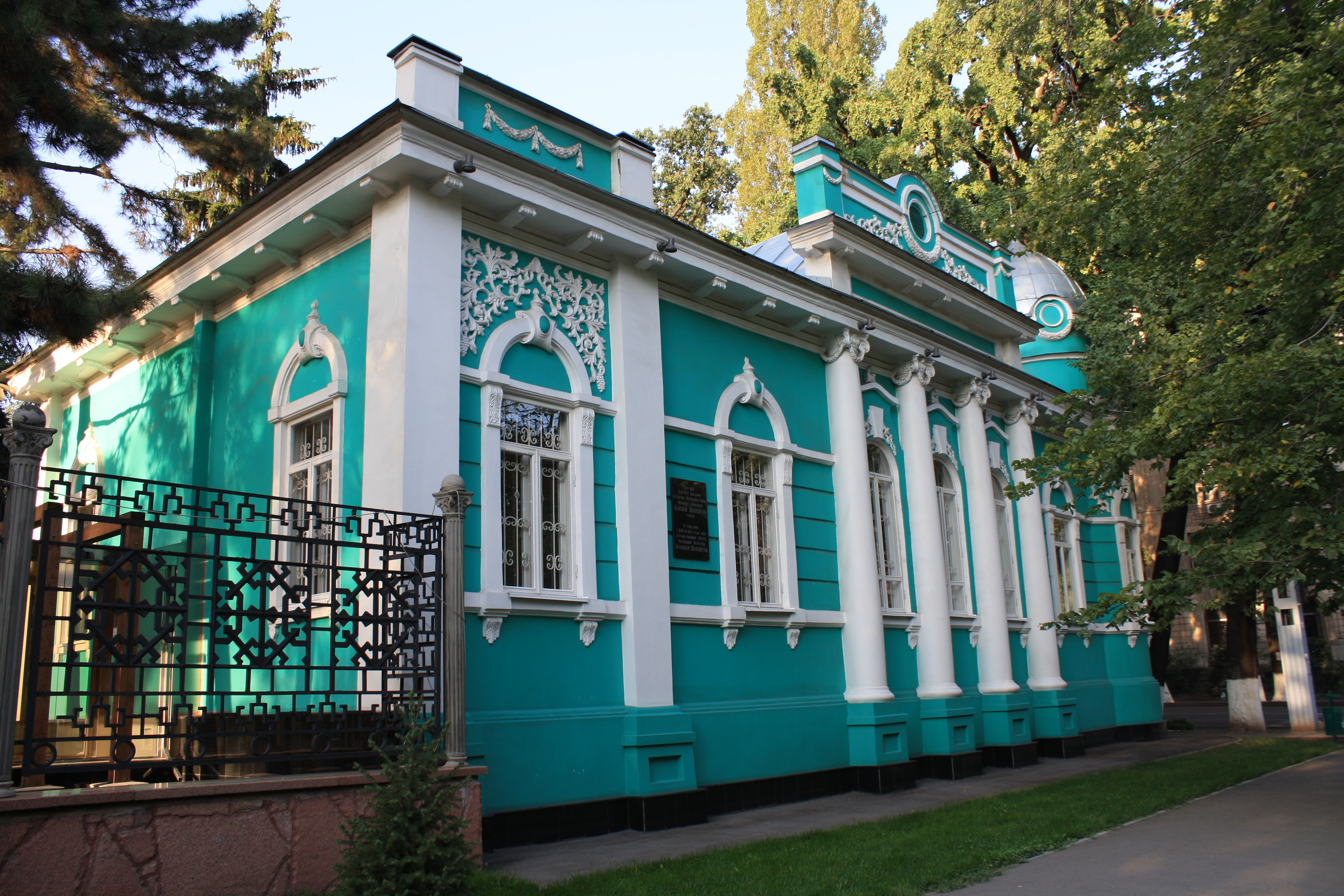
Old House, constructed in 1908, at Furmanov street

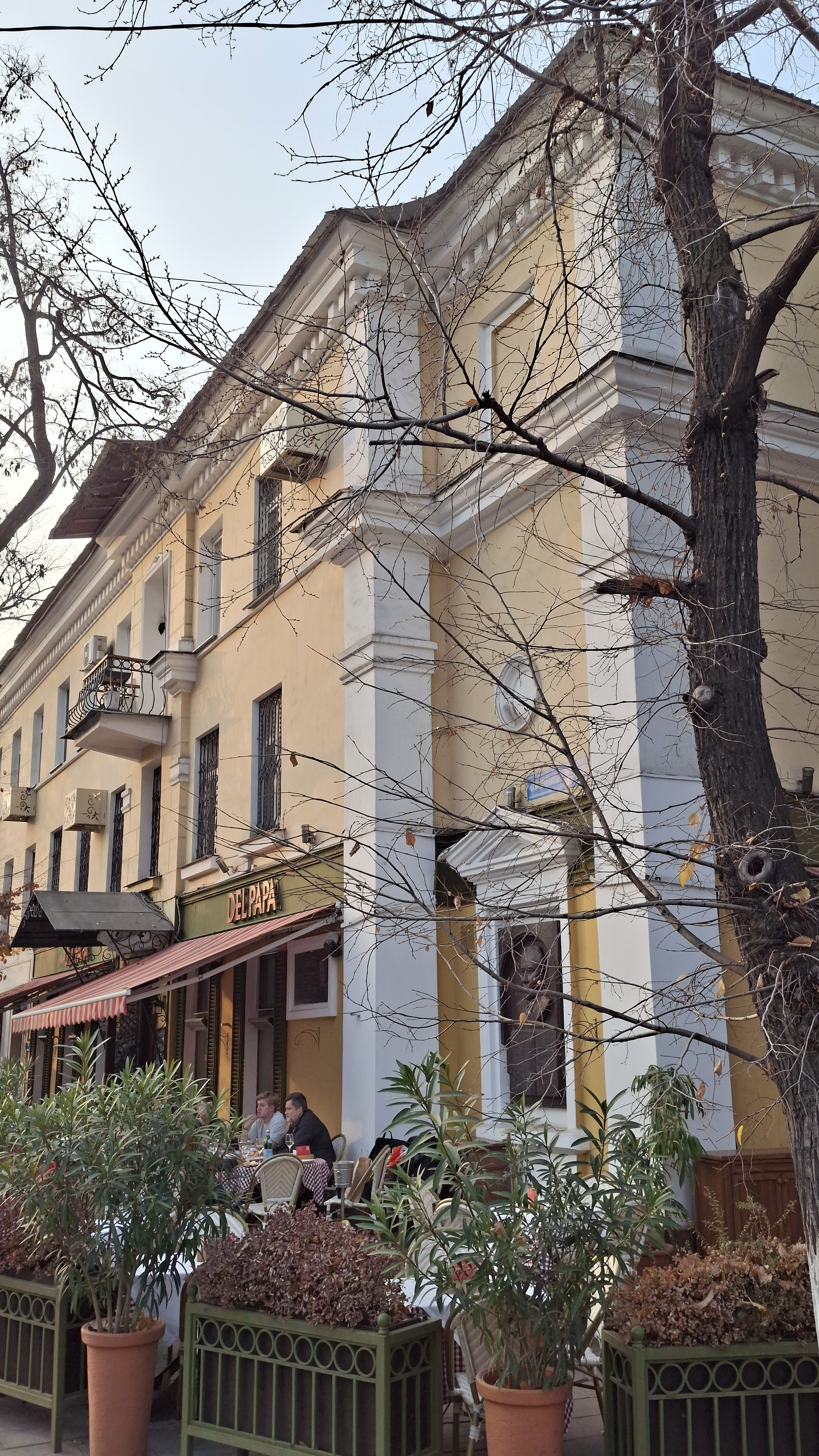
Neoclassical building on Qabanbay Batyr street

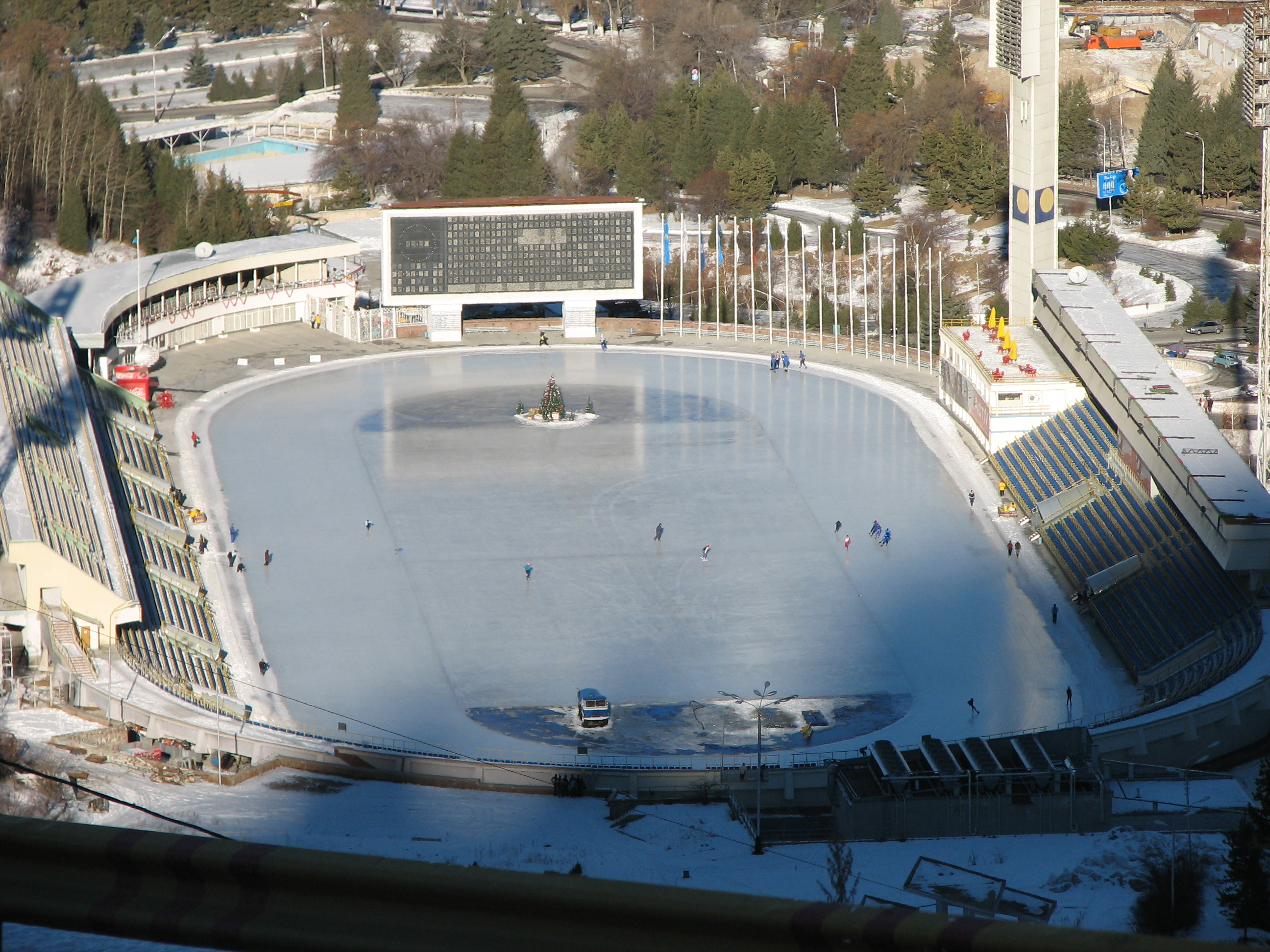
The Medeo ice skating stadium

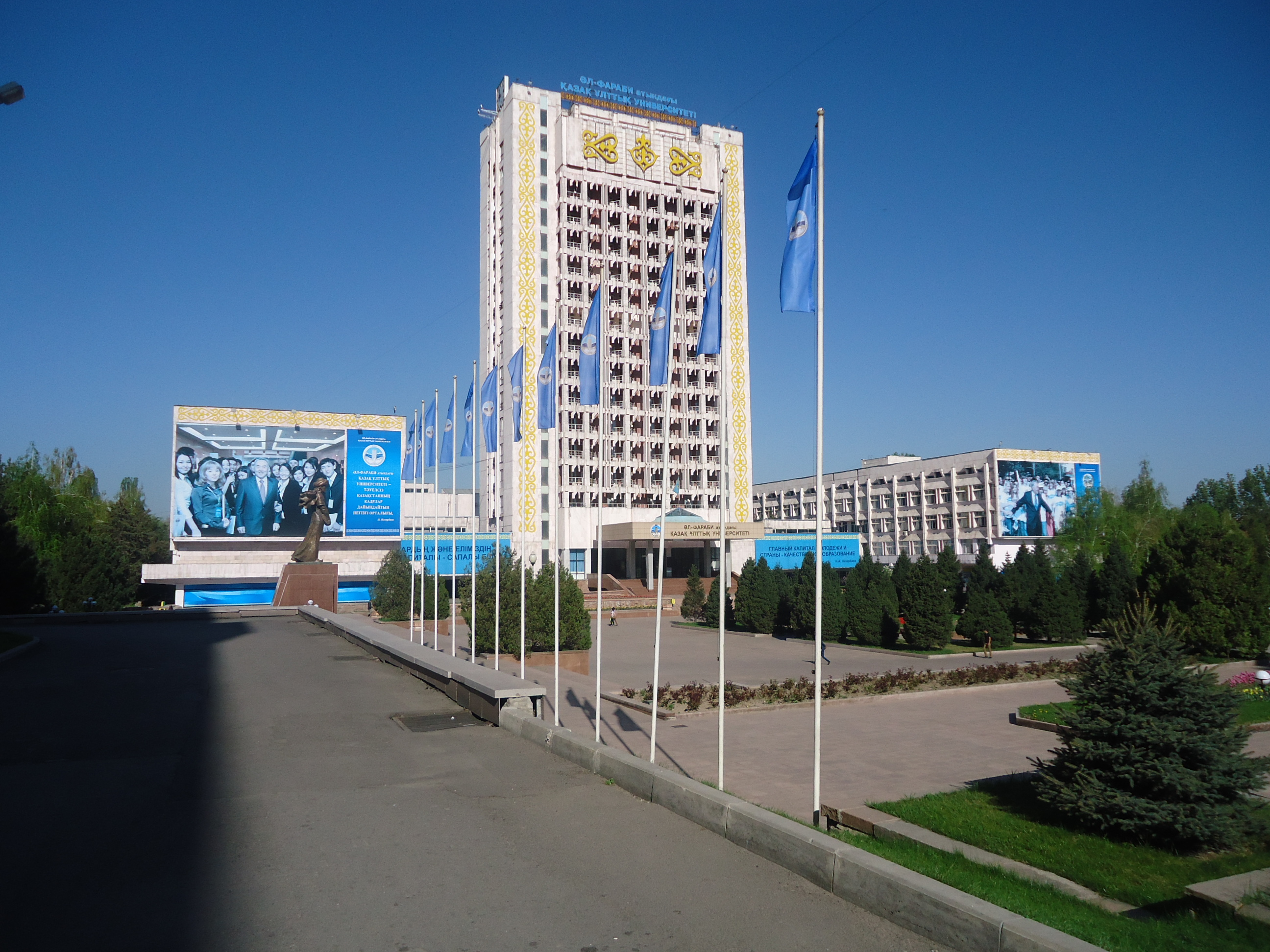
Al-Farabi Kazakh National University

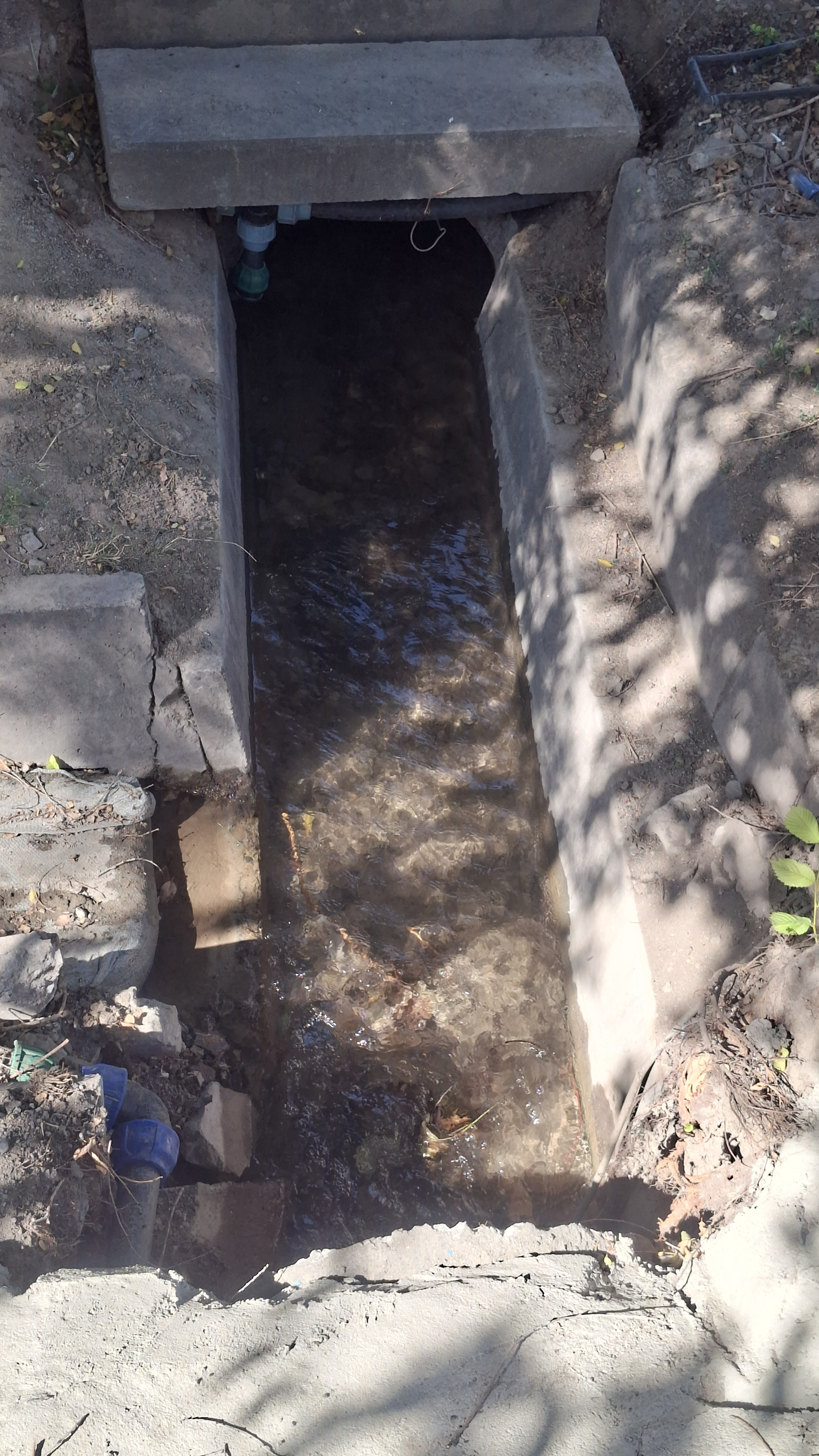
Aryq, Central Asian aqueduct system

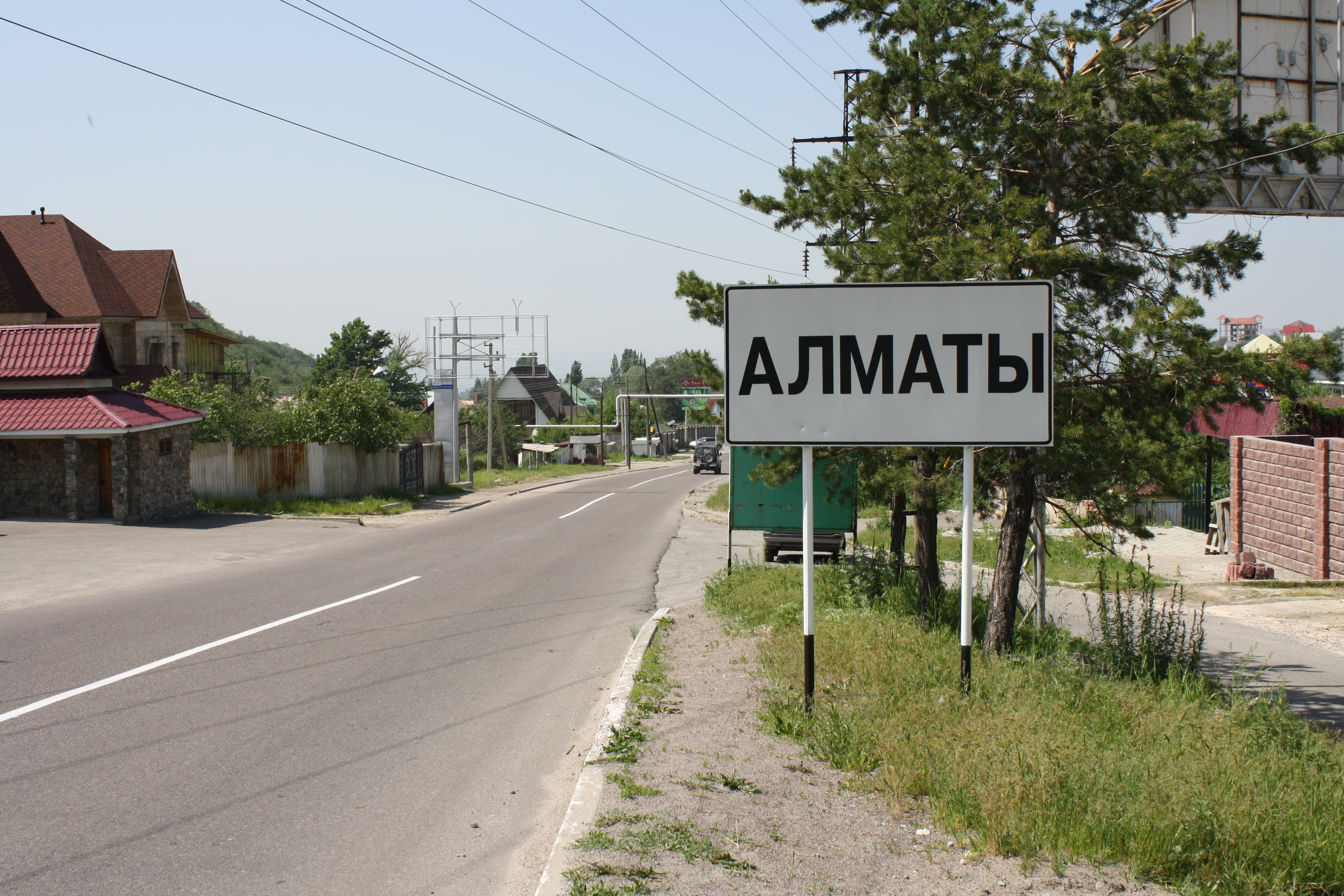
City border

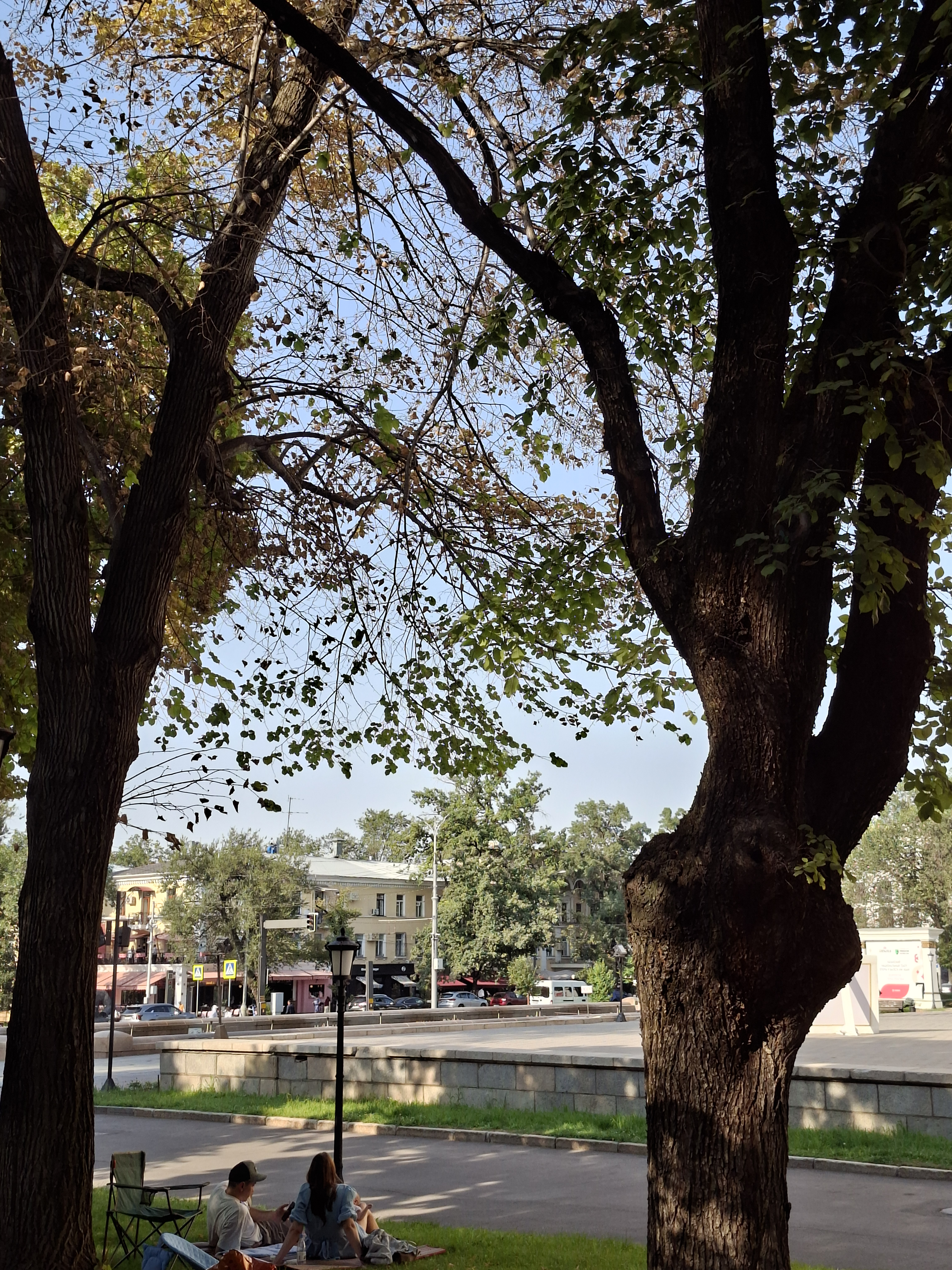
Park near Abay State Opera

== International organizations ==
The International Monetary Fund announced in October 2019 that it would launch a new regional technical assistance centre (RTAC) in Almaty. The centre will provide capacity development services to nine IMF member countries in the CCAM region. The centre is expected to cover the fiscal policy, central bank operations, financial sector supervision, and macroeconomic statistics.

== See also ==
- Almaty International School
- A. Kasteyev State Museum of Arts
- Alma Ata Declaration
- Almaty International Airport
- Architecture of Almaty
- Central State Museum of Kazakhstan
- FC Kairat
- Kazakhstan International School
- Kazakhstan National Museum of Instruments
- Monuments of Almaty
- Malus sieversii
- Shymbulak – ski resort
- WikiBilim Public Foundation
- The Golden Square (Almaty)
