= Timeline of Almaty =

History of Almaty, Kazakhstan

Coordinates: 43.2775°N 76.895833°E

The following is a timeline of the history of the city of Almaty, Almaty Province, Kazakhstan.

== 19th century ==
- 1854 – Fort Zailiyskoe erected and then renamed Fort Vernoe ("Loyal").
- 1867 – The settlement around the fortress officially renamed Verny.
- 1870s – Panfilov Park laid out.
- 1871 – Population: 12,000.
- 1884 – Synagogue established.

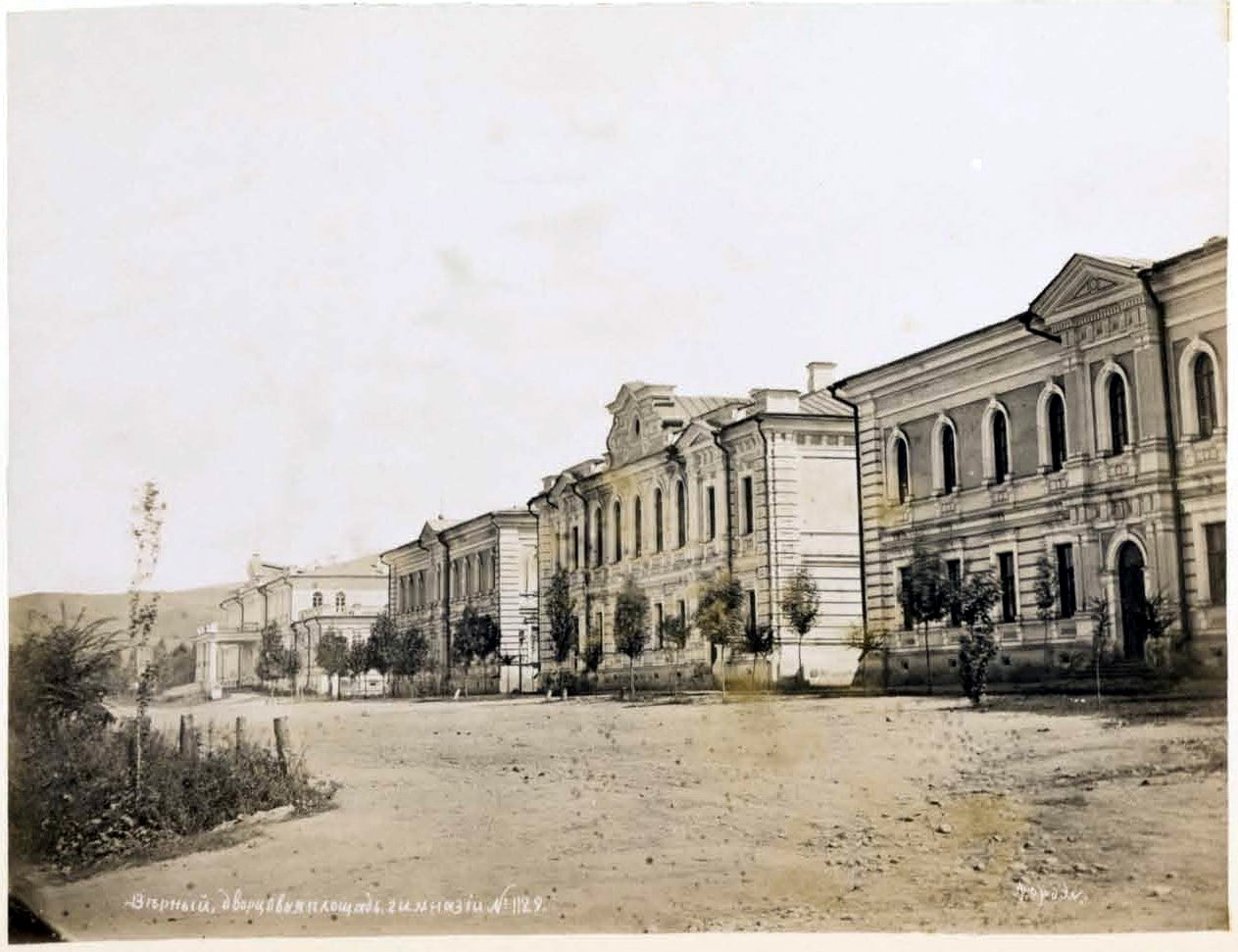
View from the 1880s

- 1887 – 9 June: A magnitude 7.3 earthquake affected the city with a maximum Mercalli intensity of X (Extreme), destroying the city and fort. Brick construction was subsequently banned in favor of wood and adobe as more earthquake resistant.

== 20th century ==
- 1907 – Ascension Cathedral built.
- 1910 – Population: 24,798.
- 1911 – 3 January: An earthquake with a magnitude of 7.7–8.7 affected the city with a maximum Mercalli intensity of X–XI (Extreme), causing 450 deaths, although the avoidance of brick in construction proved helpful.
- 1914 – Population: 36,000.
- 1918 – Soviets in power; city becomes part of the Turkestan Autonomous Soviet Socialist Republic.
- 1921 – Verny renamed Alma-Ata ("Father of Apples").
- 1927 – Capital of the Kazak Autonomous Socialist Soviet Republic relocates to Alma-Ata from Kyzylorda.
- 1928 – Kazakh State Theatre relocates to Alma-Ata.
- 1930 – Turkestan-Siberia Railway begins operating.
- 1931 – Central State Museum of Kazakhstan and National Library of Kazakhstan established.
- 1934
  - Abay Opera House and Kazakh State University open.
  - Alma-Ata Documentary Film Studio established.
  - Uighur Music and Drama theatre group founded.
- 1935
  - Almaty Airport built.
  - National Art Gallery opens.
- 1936
  - City becomes capital of the Kazakh Soviet Socialist Republic.
  - Almaty Zoo opens.
- 1939 – Population: 230,528.
- 1941
  - Central United Film Studio established.
  - 1 October: Polish diplomatic post established.
- 1942 – 20 July: Polish diplomatic post closed.
- 1944 – Alma-Ata Studio for Feature and Documentary Films established.
- 1946 – Kurmangazy Conservatory established.
- 1949 – Almaty District Library established.
- 1951 – Medeo skating rink opens.
- 1954 – Lokomotiv Almaty football club formed.
- 1958 – Almaty Central Stadium opens.
- 1960 – Republican Scientific-Technical Library established.
- 1963 – Korean Theatre relocates to Almaty.
- 1967 – Kok Tobe cable car begins operating.
- 1970 – Hotel Kazakhstan built.
- 1972 – Medeu Dam built.
- 1978
  - Republican Book Museum opens.
  - September: International Conference on Primary Health Care held.

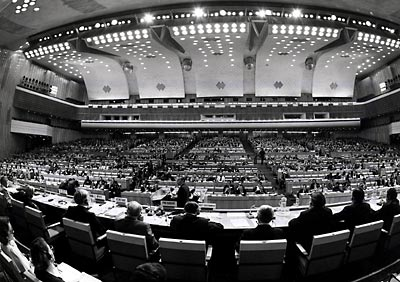
International Conference on Primary Health Care, 1978

- 1979 – Population: 975,000.
- 1980 – Kazakhstan National Museum of Instruments founded.
- 1983 – Almaty Tower built.
- 1985 – Population: 1,068,000 (estimate).
- 1986 – December: Jeltoqsan protests against Soviet regime.
- 1989 – Voice of Asia lip synching contest begins.
- 1991
  - 21 December: Alma-Ata Protocol signed, establishing the Commonwealth of Independent States.
  - City becomes capital of independent Republic of Kazakhstan.
- 1992
  - Karavan begins publication.
  - Central State Archives of Recent History headquartered in city.
  - Akhmetzhan Yesimov becomes head of Alma-Ata regional government.
- 1993
  - Alma-Ata officially renamed Almaty.
  - Kazakh Interbank Currency Exchange headquartered in Almaty.
  - Kazakhskaya Pravda in publication.
  - Kazakhstan Institute for Strategic Studies founded.
  - Population: 1,176,000 (estimate).
- 1995 – Katelco established.
- 1997
  - Kazakh capital moved from Almaty to Astana.
  - Zamanbek Nurkadilov becomes governor of the Almaty region.
- 1998 – Mukhtar Auezov Museum-House built.
- 2000
  - Respublika (Kazakh newspaper) begins publication.
  - Football Club Tsesna formed.

== 21st century ==
- 2001 – Public Policy Research Center, and Center for Foreign Policy and Analysis founded.
- 2003 – International Institute for Modern Politics founded.
- 2006 – Protest.
- 2007 – Almaty Cup tennis tournament begins.
- 2008
  - Haileybury Almaty school founded.
  - Akhmetzhan Yessimov becomes mayor.
- 2009 – Population: 1,365,105.
- 2011
  - Almaty Metro begins operating.
  - 2011 Asian Winter Games held.
- 2012 – Population: 1,472,866.
- 2013
  - January: Airplane crash near city kills at least 20 people. No survivors reported.
  - City hosts P5+1-Iran meetings.
- 2014 – Economic protest.
- 2015 – Baibek Bauyrzhan becomes mayor.

== See also ==
- Almaty history
- List of Akims of Almaty City
- List of universities in Almaty
- Other names of Almaty
- History of Kazakhstan

== Bibliography ==
- Lansdell, Henry (1885). "From Altyn-Immel to Vierny". Russian Central Asia, including Kuldja, Bokhara, Khiva and Merv. London: Sampson Low, Marston, Searle, & Rivington.
- Ralph Patteson Cobbold (1900), "Vierny to Balkash", Innermost Asia, London: W. Heinemann, OCLC 2398669
- "Vyernyi" . Encyclopædia Britannica. Vol. 28 (11th ed.). 1910. p. 222.
- Catherine Alexander (2007). "Almaty: Rethinking the Public Sector". In Catharine Alexander; Victor Buchli; Caroline Humphrey (eds.). Urban Life in Post-Soviet Asia. UK: Taylor & Francis.
