= Abai Square =

Coordinates: 43°14′35″N 76°57′29″E

- Абай алаңы (Kazakh)
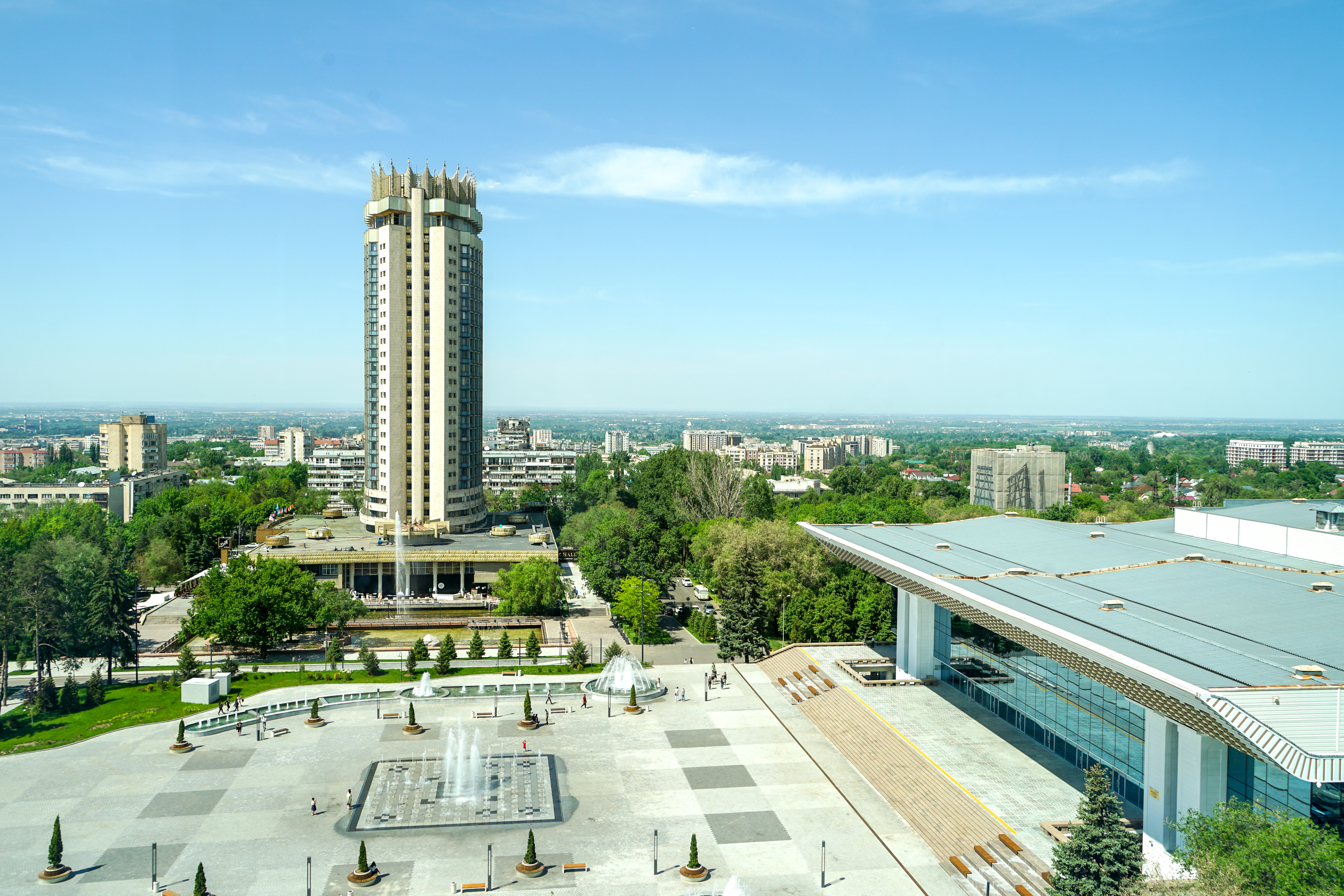
- Aerial view of Abai Square
- Interactive map of Abai Square
- Location: Almaty, Kazakhstan

History
- Built: 19th century

The Abai Square (Kazakh: Абай алаңы, romanized: Abai alañy) is a city square in Almaty, Kazakhstan. It is named after the Kazakh poet and enlightener Abai Qunanbaiuly whose monument is located in the middle. The square features a public garden and a number of fountains clad in granite. The square is located in front of the Palace of the Republic and around it are the Hotel Kazakhstan, Arman cinema, and a cable station linking to the Kók Tóbe Park.

The Abai Square is known to frequently host as a space for public gatherings, ceremonies, and concerts.

== History ==
This square was originally formed at the end of the 19th century. In 1960, at the corner of Abai and Lenin Avenues, a monument to Abai Qunanbaiuly was erected, around which buildings were built in subsequent years with the Arman cinema and cable car station to Kok Tobe. In 1970, the Lenin Palace (now Palace of the Republic) was constructed which was then followed by Hotel Kazakhstan and on the side of it a large pond-pool with a fountain.
