= The Beatles Monument =

Monument in Russia

Coordinates: 43°13′58″N 76°58′33″E

The Beatles monument
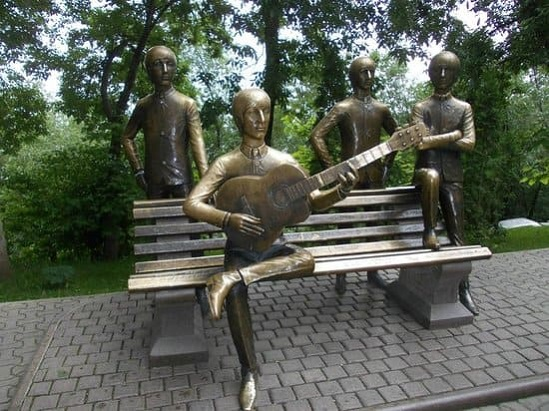
- Interactive map of The Beatles monument
- Location: Kók Tóbe Park, Almaty, Kazakhstan
- Completion date: 2007

The Beatles Monument (Russian: Памятник The Beatles) is a monument to the English rock band The Beatles in Kók Tóbe Park, Almaty, Kazakhstan.

== Monument composition ==
The composition of the monument represents a bronze bench on which sits John Lennon playing the guitar, surrounded by the other members of the band standing: Paul McCartney, Ringo Starr and George Harrison. Songs by The Beatles are constantly played from speakers.

== Installation details ==
The bronze monument by sculptor Eduard Kazaryan on Kok-Tobe Mountain was unveiled in 2007. The funds for the construction of the monument were allocated by the "Seimar" charitable non-profit foundation. The competition committee considered a large number of designs for the monument and only one was chosen. Permission for installing the monument was obtained from the Ministry of Culture of Kazakhstan: this required obtaining agreement with the rights holder of The Beatles brand. In addition, the surviving members of the band, Paul McCartney and Ringo Starr, gave their consent to build the monument.
