= IKS =

IKS or Iks may mean:

- the members of the Ik tribe in Uganda
- IKS magazine (InformCourier-Svyaz) - Russian telecommunications, media, and IT magazine
- "Imperial Klingon Starship", a ship prefix used by Klingon starships in Star Trek
- Indian Knowledge Systems, an Indian governmental division for indigenous knowledge
