= Antonyuk =

Antonyuk (Russian: Антонюк) is an East Slavic patronymic surname derived with the Ruthenian patronymic suffix -iuk from the given name Anton. Transliterastion variant Antoniuk: Notable people with this name include the following:

- Darya Antonyuk (born 1996), Russian singer
- Marina Antonyuk (born 1962), Russian shot put athlete
- Michael Antonyuk (1935–1993), Kazakhstani artist
- Volodymyr Antonyuk (fl. 2004–2012), Ukrainian Paralympic footballer
- Yekaterina Antonyuk (born 1974), Belarusian cross-country skier
