= Antoniuk (disambiguation) =

Antoniuk may refer to:

- Antoniuk (surname)
- Osiedle Antoniuk, Białystok, district of Białystok in Poland
