= Michael Antonyuk =

Soviet artist

Michael Yakovlevich Antonyuk
- Born: 12 March 1935; Tulychiv, Volyn, Second Polish Republic.
- Died: 14 April 1993 (aged 58)
- Resting place: City Cemetery, Saryarka District, Astana, Kazakhstan
- Education: 1954–1961 – The Lviv National Academy of Arts (former Lviv State Institute of Applied and Decorative Arts)
- Known for: monumental frescoes, mosaics, molten-cast-stained glass, easel painting, graphics, ceramics, photography
- Style: Monumental, Cubism, Soviet avant-garde
- Movement: Soviet Modernism, Epoch of Socialist Realism

Michael Yakovlevich Antonyuk (Russian: Михаил Яковлевич Антонюк; (12 March 1935 – 14 April 1993) was a prominent honorary artist of the Republic of Kazakhstan, a monumentalist, and a member of the Union of Artists of the USSR. Regarded as an influential Avant-garde artist during the Socialist realism era, Michael Antonyuk combined elements of Cubism, Soviet avant-garde and Modernism.

Antonyuk was a gifted painter known for oil on canvas. His artistic skill managed to express his own style, although early work shows the influence of Post-Impressionism and Cézanneism, for example, "Portrait of the Artist's Wife". His artistic repertoire was influenced by Taras Shevchenko's Academic Art, the Impressionism of Henri Matisse and Vincent van Gogh, the Cubism of Fernand Léger and Pablo Picasso, and the geometric abstractionism of Kazimir Malevich. Antonyuk's wide-ranging artistic catalogue encompassed stained glass, mosaic, encaustic accretion technique, lithography, mixed media, and photography in addition to collaborative works with various Soviet artists.

According to Valentin Pak, art historian and former Director of the Museum of Modern Art, Kazakhstan, Astana (former Tselinograd) "...Michael Yakovlevich worked as an artist on an expansive theme of an all-encompassing palette. The vast expression in his paintings harmonize with today's movement, so we can say that his art is true modernism".

== Early childhood ==
Michael Yakovlevich Antonyuk was born on 12 March 1935 in Tulychiv, Volyn Oblast, Second Polish Republic. He was the oldest child of simple villagers Marusya Antonyuk and Yakov Karpovich Antonyuk. A talented composer who played several instruments, his father instilled in Michael an artistic appreciation and the love of native nature. He developed an attentive awareness to his surroundings, embracing vivid Ukrainian culture. Michael Antonyuk saw vibrant colors, and his paintings would later illuminate all the hues of the rainbow. The significance of Antonyuk's color harmonic expression derived from traditional Ukrainian folklore.

=== WWII ===
At the age of 6, Michael Antonyuk fled with his three little sisters and mother into the forest to escape the burning of his village Tulychiv. During World War II, he began to draw with vine charcoal, made from burned sticks due to the scarcity of pencils.

***add artwork "burnt village" and "cry". Citation needed of childhood reflection

== Education ==
After high school, Michael Yakovlevich Antonyuk joined the Monumental Painting Department at The Lviv National Academy of Arts, Ukraine (former Lviv Institute of Decorative and Applied Art). He trained under world renowned artists such as Roman Yulianovich Selsky (1903 - 1990), Ukrainian and Soviet painter, educator, professor, and Honorary People's Artist of Ukraine (1989). Selskiy was a beloved Professor of Antonyuk, and colleagues. Roman Selsky instilled comprehensive artistic knowledge in his students, teaching the technical disciplines of the great masters: Paul Cézanne, Vincent van Gogh, Henri Matisse, and Pablo Picasso. Selsky is known for teaching Color theory, revealing harmony in picturesque canvases of Diego Velázquez, Peter Paul Rubens, Claude Monet, Édouard Manet, and Eugène Delacroix. Learning the fundamental methodology of the great European Colorists laid the foundation for Antonyuk's creative principles.

=== Art dissertation ===
- T.G. Shevchenko. 120x100, 1961, plywood, encaustic accretion technique.
- "Katerina", 120x100, 1961, oil on canvas. This graduation work was made in collaboration with Vasiliy Tovtin.

== USSR ==
=== Ukraine ===
Michael Antonyuk graduated from the Lviv State Institute of Applied and Decorative Arts in 1961 with government clearance and credentials. He was given various monumental art projects in the capital of Ukraine, Kyiv. In addition, Khrushchev's Thaw created an allure for exploration and development of the vast wild Tselina steppes and virgin land. The greatest migration in Soviet history attracted research teams, scientists, and graduates from Moscow, Leningrad, and Ukraine. The Virgin Lands Campaign led to the great migration of the early 1960s, representing the 15 different republics of the Soviet Union, including diverse nationalities.

=== Kazakhstan ===
In 1961, in the town of Akmolinsk, Kazakhstan, young intellectuals from the institutes of Moscow, Leningrad, and Ukraine began to arrive by train. Michael Antonyuk settled among the spacious land in Kazakh Steppe (Republic of Kazakhstan, former Soviet Union). Michael fell in love with the fertile land full of wild tulips and clover steppes. In 1962, he decided to stay and work, committing himself to this new world.

Antonyuk began a series of paintings depicting the traditional and nomadic lifestyle, featuring "Holiday Yurt", "Aqsaqal", "Mother", "Festival at Lake Tengiz", and "Still Life With Fish".

"Michael Antonyuk arrived in Tselinograd in 1961, the same year the Kazakh space exploration launched the first manned spacecraft. Among the two main themes - virgin and space - were inextricably merged into the artist's work: "Tselina lives", "Resort Borovoe", "Tselinnaya LEP", "Mangyshlak", "Tselinny bread", "Tselinnoe Priishimya", "Earth and Space", " The man and the Earth "," Intercosmos" and others. One of the works called "Celina over the planet." For the artist, it is not just a metaphor: expanses of virgin land and space open spaces are equally close to his worldview. I asked his son: "Native land for Michael Antonyuk - is it Ukraine or Kazakhstan?". - "It seems to me, more than all the same Kazakhstan", - said Yaroslav. The artist studied the national culture of Kazakhstan and loved the land. Without love and deep understanding, one can not create works that his colleague Ivan Svitich said, "Antoniuk painted his masterpieces with a different colorful richness. The joy of color, clarity of rhythm, the solemnity of the composition, woven from the Kazakh ornament, spikes, cars, rockets, yurts, national costumes." ("Yurt", "Dastarkhan," "The holiday," "The People's mistress from Aji village"). -Natalya Kurpyakova, Kazakhskaya Pravda

Growth and construction of the city prompted development in Akmola (former name of Astana) monumental decorative art. The transformation of Akmolinsk into Tselinograd was successful due to the commitment of project managers, city planners and construction administrators. The creativity of Michael Antonyuk became of service to the aesthetic decorative land development of Tselinograd districts and neighboring towns. In 1963, Michael Antonyuk cofounded the Tselinograd regional branch of the Union of Artists of Kazakhstan and served as the first chairman on the Board of the Union of artists of USSR.

==== 1969 ====
- Finalist in the International Photography 7th Exhibition in Romania. "Old man from Uzbekistan", 100x200 cm black and white photo. (Awarded 2nd place) [wikicommons artwork & citation]
- Participation in the all Union exhibition in Moscow.
- "Still life with Cactus", 120x90, 1969, oil on canvas; + Fragments
- "Mother", 85x85, oil on canvas, 1969.

==== 1972 ====
- Completed Relief with Mosaic "Print and Kosmos" on printing press & typography building (Бейбитшилик) in Tselinograd. 8-month project in collaboration with Vasily Ivanovich Tovtin. Commissioned from Kazakh government as an aesthetic monument to beautify the city.
- Exhibition of fine arts of Kazakhstan, Alma-Ata.
- "Mangyshlak", 150x140, 1972, Tempera on canvas.
- "Recolection", 200x100, 1972 Tempera on canvas.
- Sabbatical leave to Morocco, France and Cuba.

==== 1982 ====
- "Signs of the Zodiac", Palace of Wedding Ceremonies in the city of Tselinograd. Дворец бракосочетаний. Уже снесли. Stained glass windows in the Palace of Ceremonies. Completed in 1982, each module was manually made. Featuring imported glass from Neman Belarus with a thickness of 25–30 mm. This series was framed on the surface texture of the building, which deflected sunlight to enhance the expressiveness. Technique: Fastened panes with mortar and metal armature. Demolished in 1990
- "Landscape and Still Life". Республиканская выставка, Almaty Kazakhstan

==== 1984 ====
- "Flora of Kazakhstan" and "Industry", 4x6 meters, Collaborative work between Michael Antonyuk and Vasily Ivanovich Tovtin. Completed in 1984 in the hotel "Abay", Astana (formerly known as "Tourist" in the city of Tselinograd)

== Final years ==
On the 40th anniversary of victory in the Great Patriotic War, Michael Antonyuk painted "The Tragedy of Volyn Village Kortelisy" (Ukraine). In 1986, Michael Antonyuk was honored in a 50-year birthday biography publication by Ivan Svitich. In 1992, Michael Antonyuk was awarded the title of Honored Artist of the Republic of Kazakhstan.

Antonyuk fell ill in 1993, and was subsequently diagnosed with Parkinson's disease. Antonyuk suffered a stroke, and died at the age of 58 on 14 April 1993. He is interred in City Cemetery, Saryarka District, in Astana, Kazakhstan. He is survived by his children, Oksana Antonyuk (Master of Architecture, NYC) and Yaroslav Antonyuk (Artist, Architect & Interior Designer, Astana).

== Legacy ==
Antonyuk dedicated his career of monumental artwork to his nationalist admiration for Kazakhstan. Art historians focus on the fact that his art reflects the inner world of Antonyuk and his thoughts. According to Natalya Kurpyakova, deputy editor-in-chief of Niva Magazine, "Michael's artistic work has appeared in the public service of social needs in construction, district towns, state and collective farms. He was elected a member of the USSR and the Kazakh SSR, under the Central Auditing Commission of the Union of Artists. Fourteen years he served as chairman of the Tselinograd Union of Artists of Kazakhstan. He was conferred the title of Honored Artist of the Republic of Kazakhstan, Muralist, avant-garde Soviet realism and the Union of Artists since 1963." His art studio walls are densely covered with canvas. The paintings of Michael Antonyuk are found in the Museum of Modern Art, Astana, Kazakhstan in addition to private collections.

== Works ==
=== 1967 ===
- Цветное фото Дворца Целинников. Автор: Антонюк М. Я., 1967 г.

=== 1970 ===
- "Aggression", 163x103, 1970, oil on canvas.

=== 1971 ===
- Exhibition of fine arts of Kazakhstan, Tselinograd.

=== 1973 ===
- Montmartre, from the series "Paris", 100x70, 1973, Mixed media, Lithography.
- "Paris", 100x70, 1973, Mixed media, Lithography.
- [fragment]
- "Festival at Lake Tengiz", 160x150, 1973, tempera, canvas.

=== 1974 ===
- Otium tour of Hungary and Czechoslovakia.
- Union of Artists of the USSR traveling exhibition in Kazakhstan.
- "Sugar Cane", 90x90, 1974, oil on canvas.

=== 1975 ===
- Ivan Fomich Svitich joined the Union of Artists, as Michael Antonyuk was Organizer and Chairman of the Union of Artists in former Soviet Union republic of Kazakhstan.
- Creative journey in Crimea.

=== 1976 ===
- "On Holiday" 160x160, 1976, tempera on canvas.
- "Dastarkhān", 170x115, 1976, tempera on canvas.
- "Holiday Yurt", 40x47, 1976, ink, graphics, etching.
- "Yurts", 75x70, 1976, ink, graphics, etching.

=== 1977 ===
- "Old Aqsaqal", 50x70, 1977, felt pen.

=== 1980 ===
- "Golden Steppe", 1980, 7x9 meters, ceramic mosaic. Commissioned for the House of Culture located in Vozdvyzhensky, Kazakhstan. A tribute to classical and folklore composer Kurmangazy Sagyrbaev.

=== 1981 ===
- "Victor Jara", 140x100, 1981, tempera, canvas.

=== 1985 ===
- "The Tragedy of Volyn Village Kortelisy in Ukraine", 200x100, 1985, tempera on canvas.

== Notes ==
- Roman Yulianovich Selsky, 1903-1989 Artist, Professor of Fine Art
- Tulychiv, native village of Michael Yakovlevich Antonyuk, in Turiysk district of Volyn region, Ukraine
- Monumental Art, from The Great Soviet Encyclopedia, 1979
- Yaroslav Mikhailovich Antonyuk, artistic protégé and son of Michael Yakovlevich Antonyuk
- Mangyshlak, Tjuk-Karagaj cape on Mangyshlak peninsula, by Taras Shevchenko Complete Works in 10 volumes. – Kyiv: ed. Academy of sciences of UkrSSR, 1964, Vol. 9, No. 60, p. 38.
- Abay, "Flora of Kazakhstan" and "Industry", 4x6 meters, collaborative work between Michael Antonyuk and Vasily Ivanovich Tovtin. Completed in 1984 in the hotel "Abay", Astana (formerly known as "Tourist" in the city of Tselinograd)
- Palace of Wedding Ceremonies, "Signs of the Zodiac", in the city of Tselinograd. Дворец бракосочетаний. Уже снесли. Stained glass windows in the Palace of Ceremonies. Completed in 1982
