= Kök Töbe (recreation area) =

Recreational area in Almaty, Kazakhstan

Coordinates: 43°13′56″N 76°58′35″E

- Көк Төбе
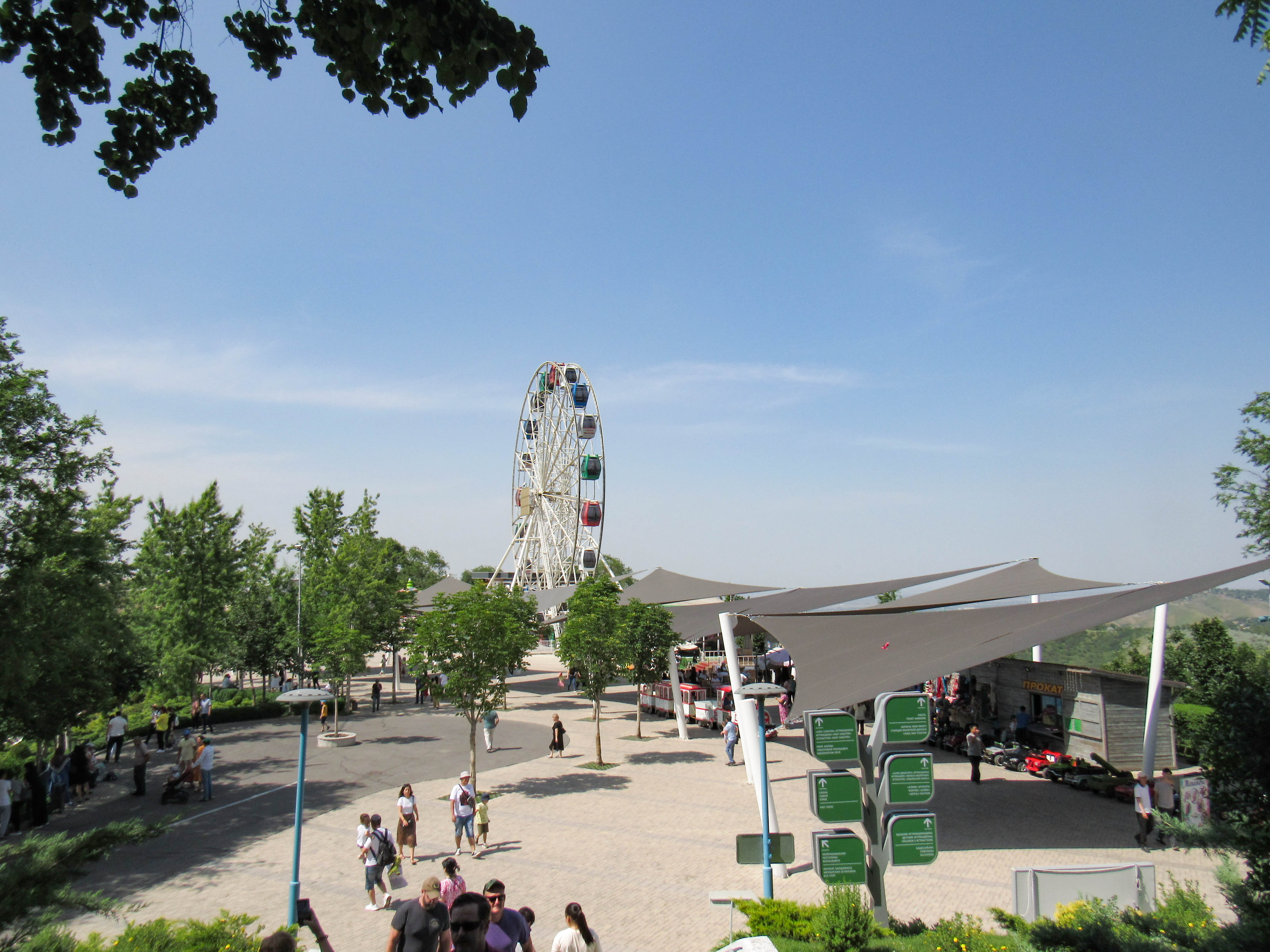
- Interactive map of Kök Töbe
- Type: recreation area
- Location: Almaty, Kazakhstan
- Created: 2006

The Kök Töbe or Kök-Töbe (Kazakh: Көк Төбе, romanized: Kök Töbe, lit. 'Green Hill'; Russian: Кок Тобе, romanized: Kok Tobe), sometimes spelled as Kok-Tyube (Russian: Кок-Тюбе) is a recreation area in Almaty, Kazakhstan, featuring amusement park attractions and restaurants. It is located on top of Köktöbe hill and connected to downtown Almaty by a cable car line, with the City Terminal near Hotel Kazakhstan. An iconic 372-meter-tall Almaty Tower stands at the foot of the hill, visible from most parts of the city.

== History ==
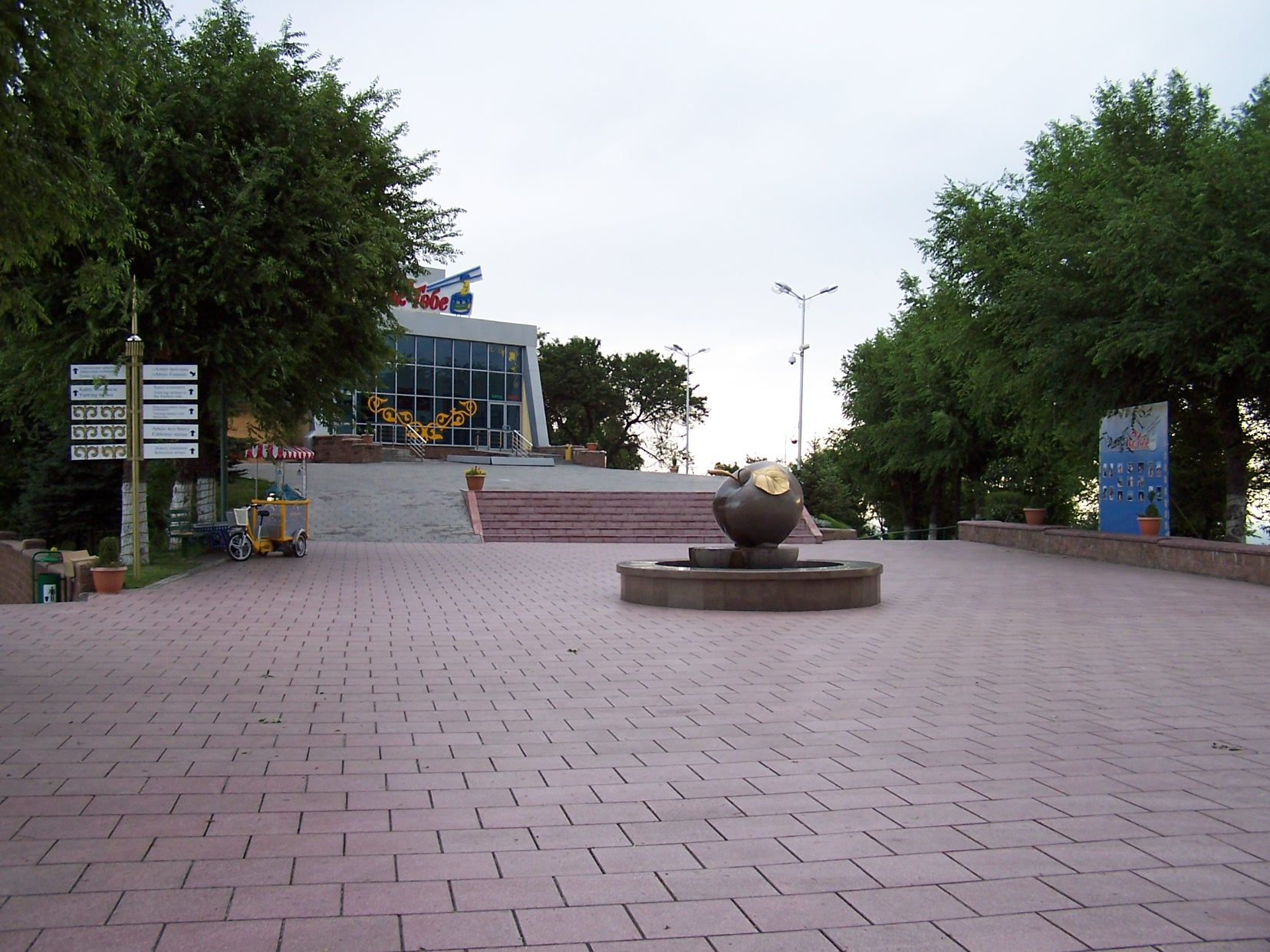
Kök Töbe in 2007

The Kök Töbe recreation area was opened in 2006 on top of the Köktöbe hill, and The Beatles monument was constructed in 2007. In September 2014, the recreation area was closed for the construction of a new cable car, as well as the reconstruction of the northern side of the mountain and the recreation area. In March 2016, the Kök Töbe completed its renovation of the cable car and the recreation area. Transport in the area currently comprises 17 cable cars. A new Ferris wheel was also built in the recreation area.

== Attractions ==
=== Almaty Tower ===
The Almaty Tower or Kök Töbe Tower, the city's television tower, is located on the south-eastern slope of the hill. It was built during 1975 and 1983, and if measured from sea level, this tower is one of the highest in the world – 372 meters tall. It has a couple observation platforms, but they are not open to the public. It is unique, because unlike other TV towers, it was built entirely of steel, and has a tubular structure. Locals considered constructing the TV tower somewhere else, but it ended up being built in Kok Tobe area.

=== Beatles monument ===
A bronze statue of The Beatles by sculptor Eduard Kazaryan was placed on Köktöbe hill on 15 May 2007. The monument was inaugurated as part of the launch of the National Award "Music feature – 2007". This is the first monument to depict the band members in full. John Lennon is seen sitting on a bench with his guitar, while behind him stand Paul McCartney, George Harrison and Ringo Starr.

== Entertainment ==
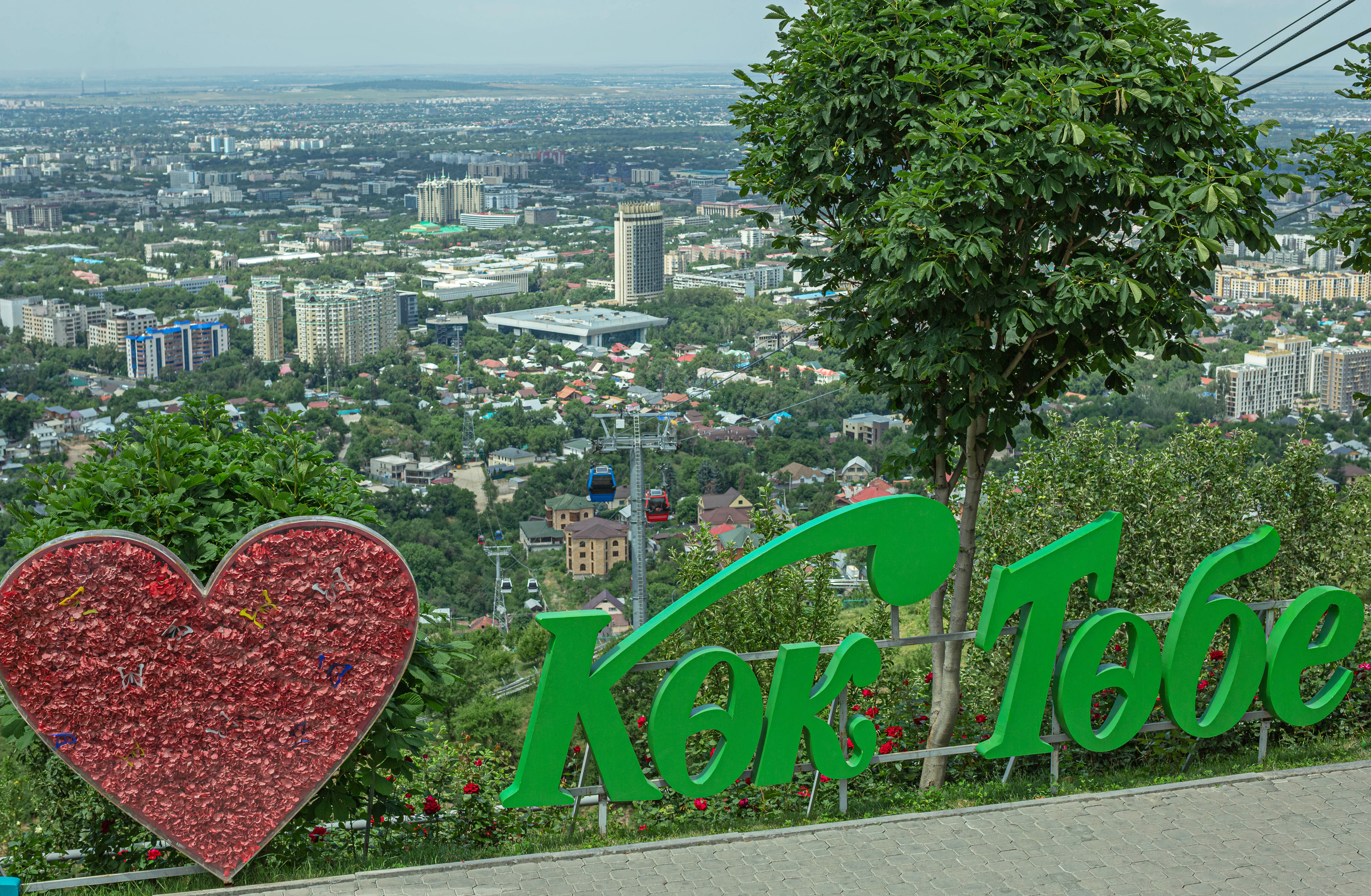
View of the city from the hill

The Kök Töbe has various entertainments such as a fountain of "desire" in the shape of an apple, a children's playground, a climbing wall, the Fast Coaster ride, an art gallery, and tea house. The park also includes restaurant "Yurt", which was modeled after traditional nomadic houses called Yurta. The restaurant is embellished with traditional Kazakh carpentry and tapestry. In addition to these attractions, on the Kök Töbe there are viewing platforms, a petting zoo, a concert hall, a lovers alley, ponds, and shops selling national souvenirs.

=== Fast Coaster ===
Fast Coaster is a roller coaster located on the hillside. It is the only roller coaster in Kazakhstan that is located on a side of a mountain. Going down with a speed of 45 km/h, users have views over the city.

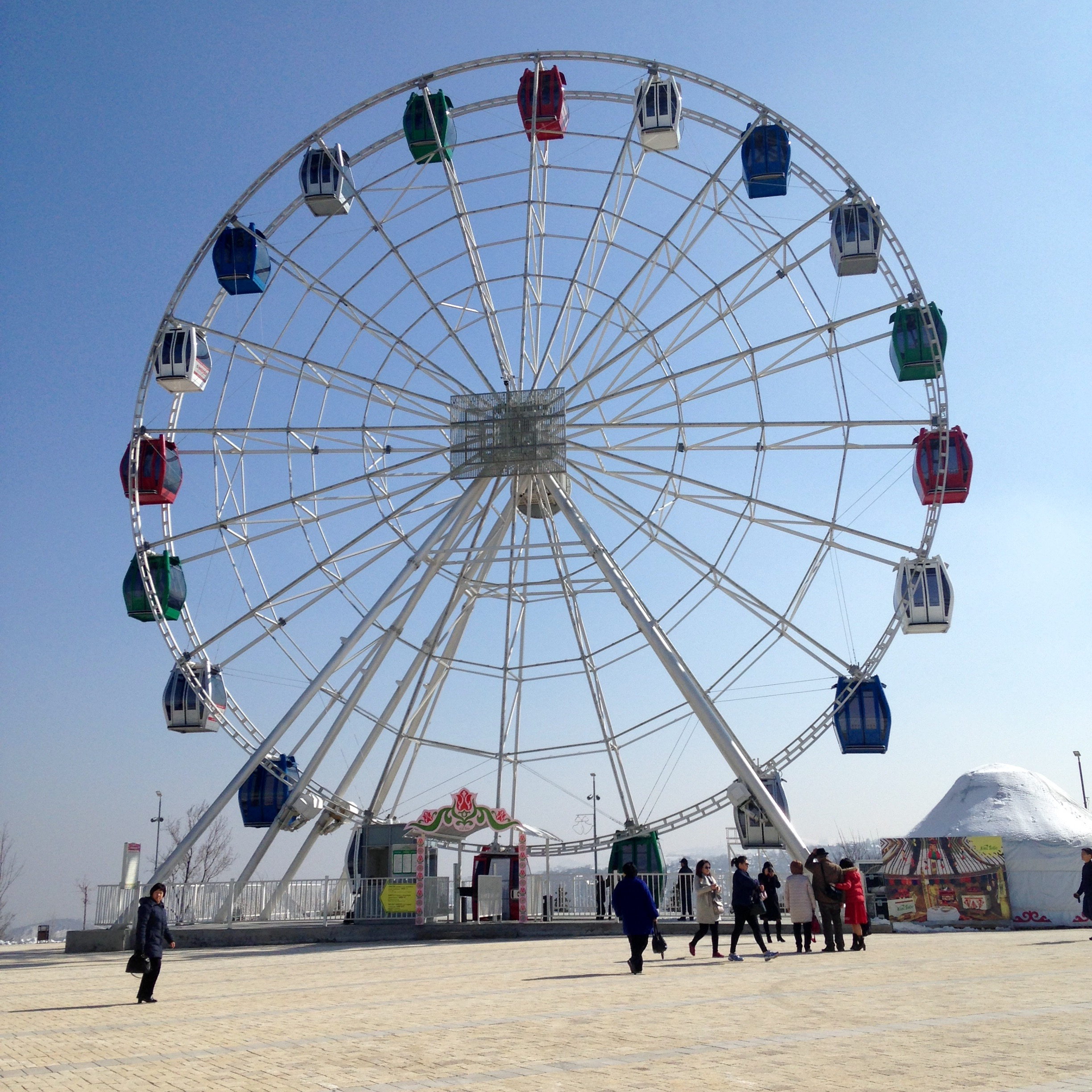
Ferris Wheel in the park

=== Alley of Lovers ===
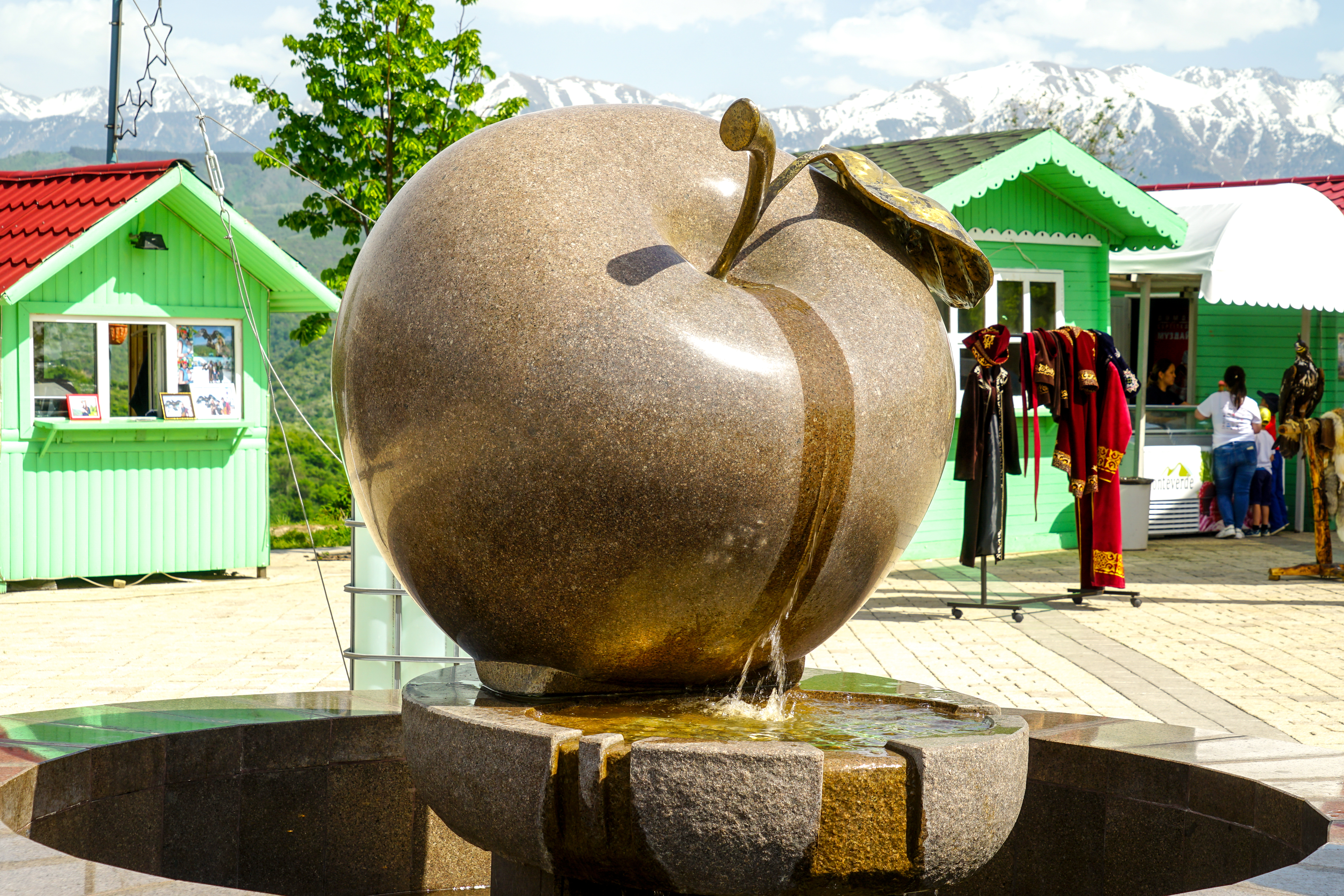
Fountain of Desires

Alley of Lovers in the recreation area is a place for romantic walks and dates.

=== Fountain of Desires ===
The Fountain of Desires in the form of granite apple, the symbol of Almaty, welcomes guests at Kok Tobe Peak. Some people throw coins into the depths of its waters, while others take photos near it.

=== Ferris Wheel ===
Located in the recreation area, the ferris wheel's height is 30 meters. It is 1,136 meters above sea level. There are 20 closed highly comfortable and safe cabins, 6 passengers for each cabin. There is great view on Almaty from cabins.

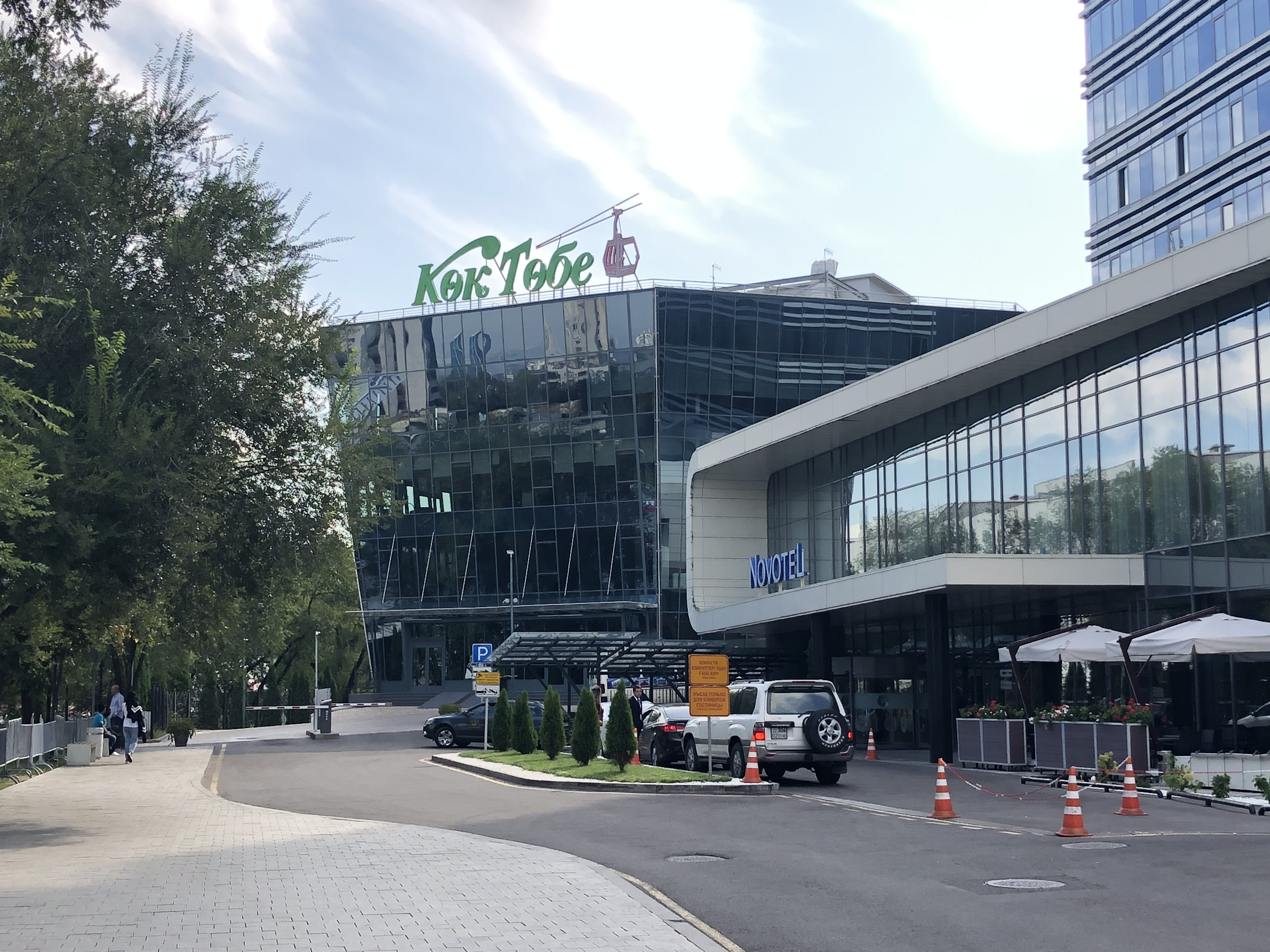
Cableway station

== Gallery ==
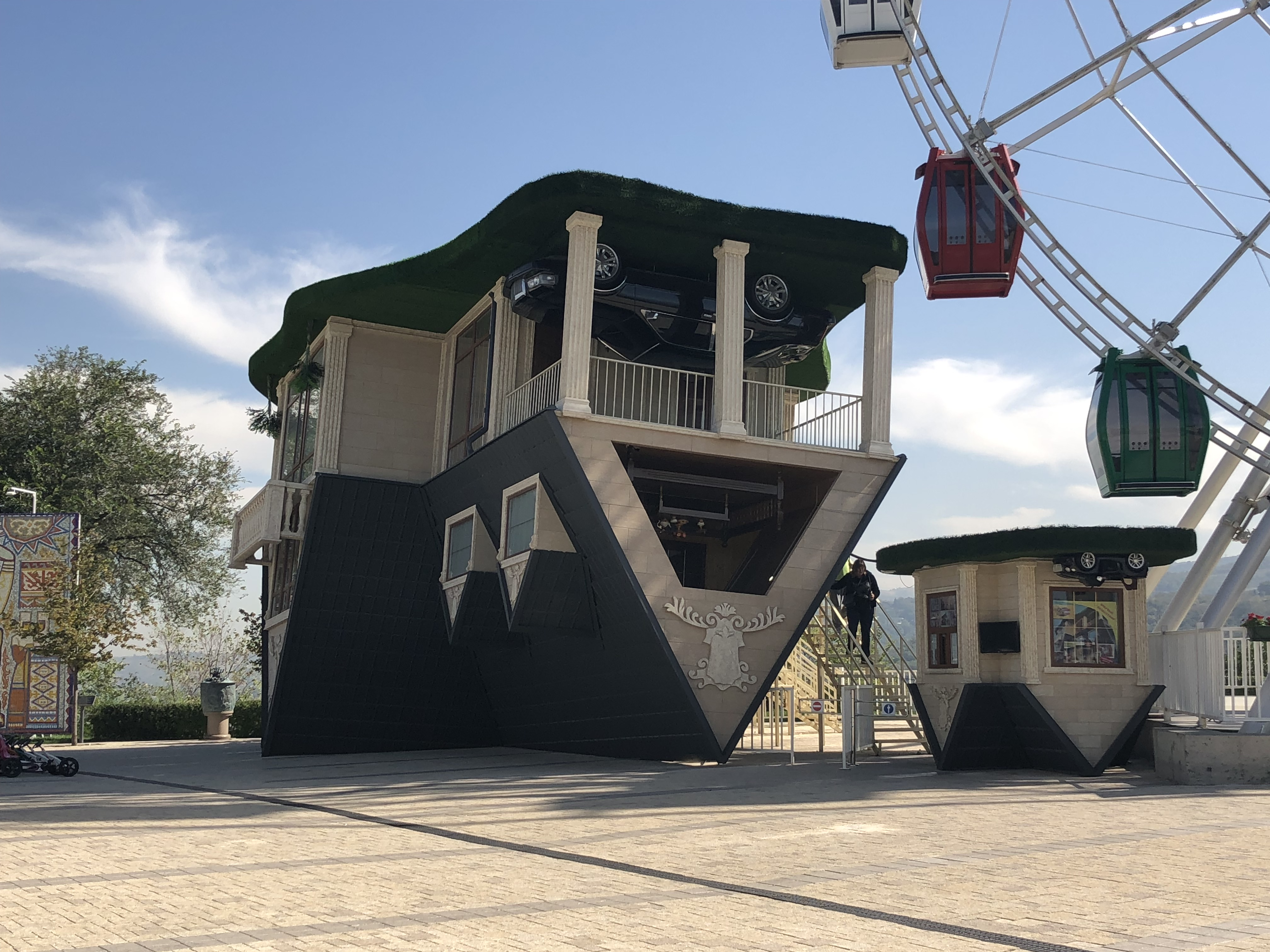
Upside down house

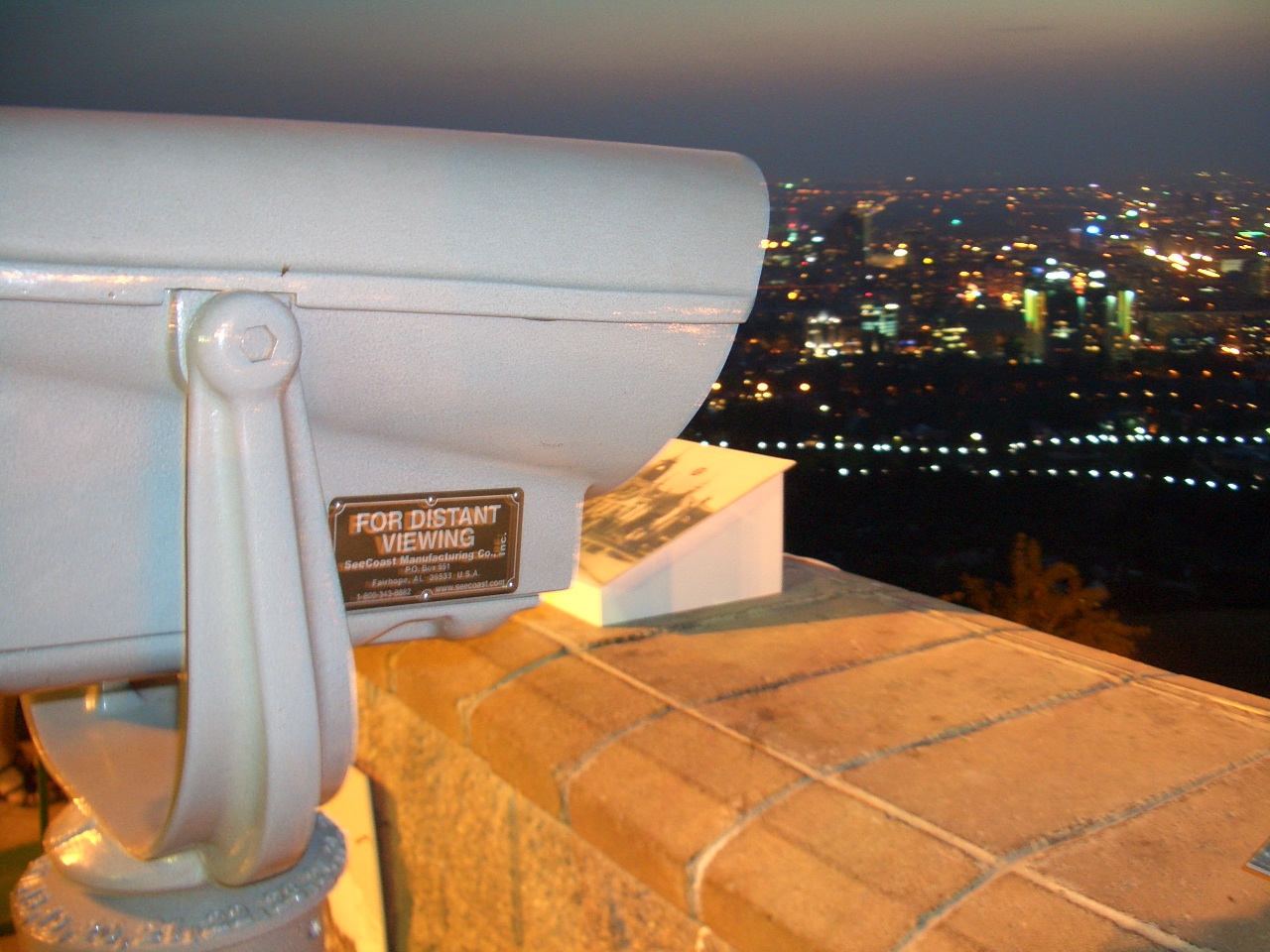
Park binoculars
