= Pioneers Palace (Almaty) =

Coordinates: 43°14′16″N 76°57′33″E

- Алматинский дворец школьников
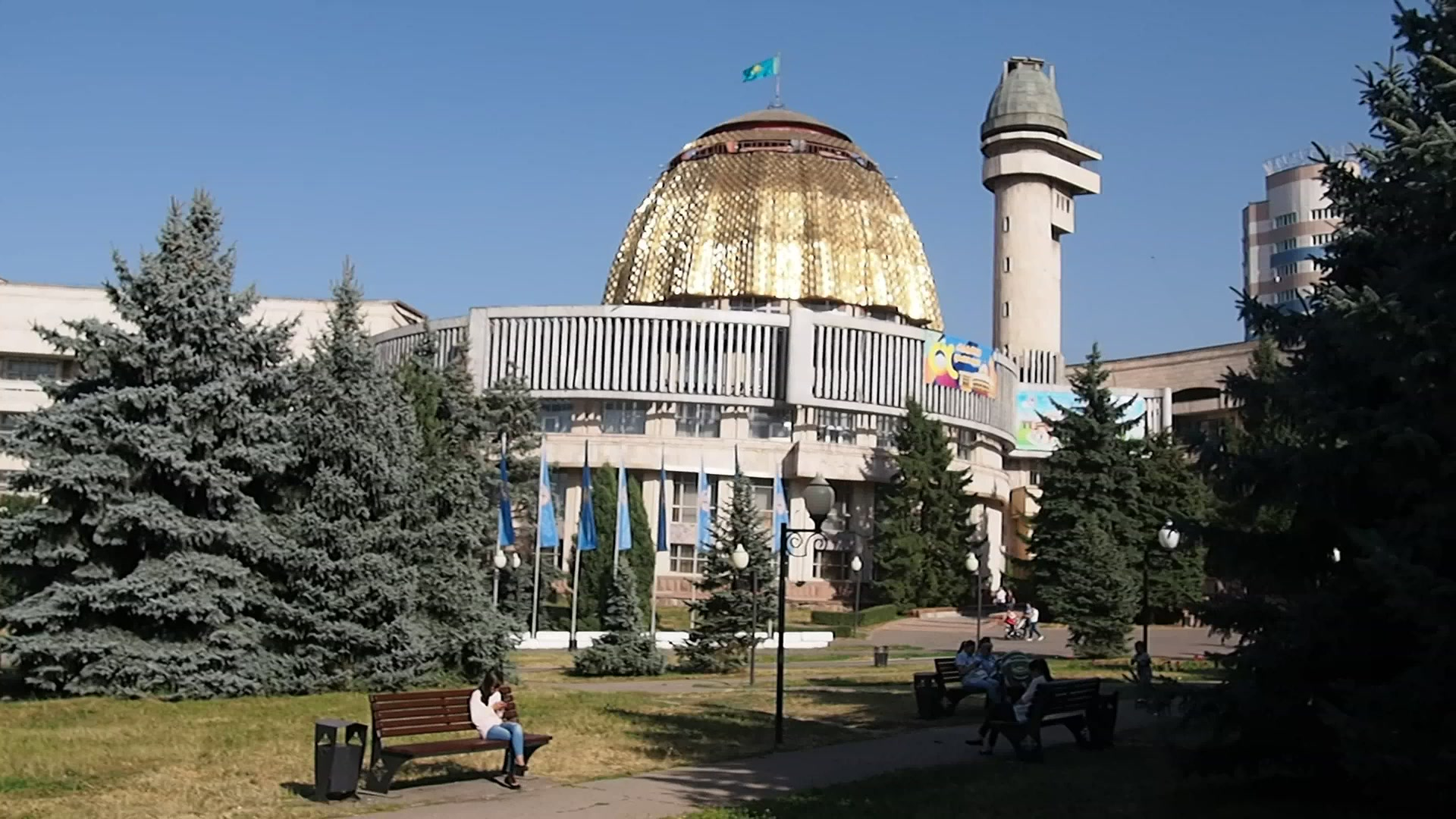
- Interactive map of the Pioneers Palace area

General information
- Location: Almaty, Kazakhstan, 114 Dostyq Avenue, Kazakhstan
- Construction started: 1979
- Completed: 1983

Design and construction
- Architects: V. N. Kim, A. P. Zuev, T. S. Abildaev et al.

The Almaty Pioneers Palace (Russian: Алматинский дворец школьников, tr. almatinskii dvorets shkolnikov, Kazakh: Алматы мектеп оқушылары сарайы, romanized: Almaty mektep oquşylary saraiy) is a Pioneers Palace, an institution from the Soviet Union to provide after-school education for children, built in Almaty in 1983.

== History ==
In 1978 the first secretary of the Central Committee of the Communist Party of Kazakhstan Dinmukhamed Kunaev decided to build the palace. Construction began in 1979 and finished in 1983. The team of architects included V. N. Kim, A. P. Zuev, T. S. Abildaev and others. The team of architects was awarded a diploma of the Supreme Soviet of the Kazakh Soviet Socialist Republic.

In 2014, the Pioneers Palace was closed for major reconstruction, the first one in the building's 30-year history. At that time, there were about 80 sports, science and technology, arts and crafts groups. All groups and sections were temporarily transferred to other educational institutions in the city. The reconstruction was finished in 2015.

== Architecture ==
The architectural and planning composition of the four-storey building is in the form of a spiral with pavilion volumes strung on its axis. The main entrance is accented by a grand staircase. The center of the composition is the Celebration hall topped with a dome, to which all groups of rooms of the palace adjoin. Diameter of the dome is 21 meters and its height is 19 meters. The decoration of the Celebration hall is a chandelier, which holds 288 lamps, weighing 3.5 tons, and its diameter is 7 meters. To the left of the dome is a 40-meter observatory tower. Korday and Balkhash granite, shell rock of Mangystau, wood and metal were used in construction. Spacious avenues and squares in front of the building allow for open air mass events. The building is designed for 2,200 schoolchildren. There is an auditorium with 800 seats, rooms for various hobby groups, gyms, a swimming pool and others. It consists of 12 pavilions, with a usable area of over 35,000 square meters.

== Heritage status ==
Since 26 January 1984, the Pioneers Palace has been included in the state list of historical and cultural monuments of local importance in Almaty. Near the Pioneers Palace there is a protective zone, a zone of regulation of development and a zone of protected natural landscape of the objects of historical and cultural heritage.
