= Antoniuk =

Antoniuk is an East Slavic patronymic surname derived with the Ruthenian patronymic suffix -iuk from the given name Anton. Transliteration variant: Antonyuk. Notable people with the name include the following:

- Dan Antoniuk (born 1981), American footballer
- Jeff Antoniuk (born 1965), Canadian saxophonist
- Maksim Antoniuk (1895–1961), Belarusian general
- Nina Antoniuk (born 1956) , maiden name of Nina Preobrazhenskaya, Soviet rower
- Owen Antoniuk (born 2002), Canadian soccer player
