= Katelco =

"Kazakhstani Telecommunications" JSC Kazakh: «Қазақстан телекоммуникациялары» АҚ «Qazaqstan telekommýnıkatsııalary» AQ Russian: АО «Казахстанские телекоммуникации»
- Company type: Joint Stock Company
- Industry: Telecommunications
- Founded: Almaty, Kazakhstan (September 26, 1995)
- Founder: Government of Republic of Kazakhstan
- Defunct: January 31, 2011
- Fate: Merged
- Successor: Kazteleradio, JSC (OTAU TV)
- Headquarters: Almaty, Kazakhstan
- Area served: Kazakhstan
- Key people: Serik Burkitbaev (President); Bazarbek Kartzhanov (Chairman); Aleksey Chernov (Vice-President, CTO)
- Services: Satellite broadcasting
- Parent: KBC, JSC; Samghau Holding, JSC; NIH Arna Media, JSC
- Subsidiaries: Nursat, JSC
- Website: www.katelco.kz, www.katelcoplus.kz

Katelco (Russian: КАТЕЛКО) was a telecommunications company in Kazakhstan founded in 1995. It closed in 2011.

== History ==
Katelco was established in 1995 as an integrated system to provide satellite television (including direct-to-home service Katelco Plus), radio, data transmission (including internet access), and telephony. The name is an abbreviation for "Kazakhstani Telecommunications Company".

Katelco provided broadcast services for national, regional and corporate TV. It owned and operated of the National Satellite Broadcasting System (NSBS) and Satellite Multi-channel Digital Broadcasting System of Direct Broadcasting "Katelco Plus". It owned main control center in Almaty and teleports in Nur-Sultan and Oral with uplink facilities in other regional capitals.

Among other resources, it used the KazSat satellite.

In 2007 Katelco was listed among top 10 Kazakhstan communication operators by the Russian telecom business magazine InformCourier-Svyaz.

31 January 2011 the company was merged into the Kazteleradio, JSC - national terrestrial and satellite operator of Kazakhstan for television and radio broadcasting.
