= Palace of the Republic, Almaty =

Concert hall in Almaty, Kazakhstan

Palace of the Republic
- Kazakh: Республика Сарайы; Russian: Дворец Республики
- Interactive map of Palace of the Republic
- Former names: Lenin Palace of Culture (1970-1991)
- Address: Abay Avenue, Dostyk Ave 56
- Location: Almaty, Kazakhstan
- Coordinates: 43.2432°N 76.9596°E
- Capacity: 2,567 seats

Construction
- Opened: 1970
- Renovated: 2010

Website
- www.republicpalace.kz

The Palace of the Republic (Kazakh: Республика сарайы, romanized: Respublika saraiy; Russian: Дворец Республики, romanized: Dvorets Respubliki) is a concert hall building located in Almaty, Kazakhstan. It is intended for concerts, festivals and other cultural events. It was one of the premiere sites for the Eurasia Film Festival. Outside, with the fountains on the square in front of the Palace and the monument of the Kazakh poet Abai, Palace of the Republic is one of the main known attractions of Almaty from the Kunaev era. The building is located at the Abai Square in cross road section of Dostyq and Abai Avenue.

It is considered as a monument based on an urban planning and architecture since January 26, 1982.

== History ==
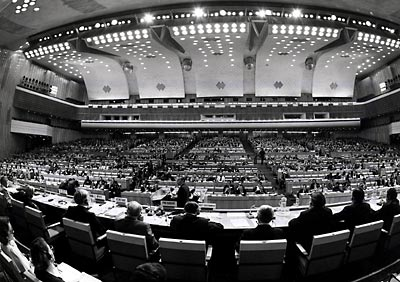
Primary Health Care meeting in the palace 1978.

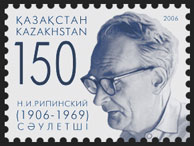
Nikolai Ripinsky, one of the founders of the palace Kazakhstan stamp, 2006

Built in 1970, previously named as the Lenin Palace of Culture, was opened during the celebration of the 100th anniversary of the birth of Vladimir Lenin. It was renamed to the Palace of the Republic by the Cabinet of Ministers of the Kazakh SSR in December 6, 1991 by the proposal of the Kazakh SSR State Committee for Culture. The palace was also place for International Primary Health Care meeting where the Alma-Ata Declaration was adopted in 1978.

== Design ==
The "Tent" design of the roof rests on the eight concrete pillars and walls of the building envelope, not reaching the roof, give the impression of it floating in the air. The colors of the hall consists of white ceiling, gold wall and red seats. The layout of the entrance hall and the lobby of the Palace used a combination of multi-dimensional space of different levels, creating a single whole room with the help of an intermediate level of the main entrance and grand staircase encircling the lobby with 3 sides. The main lobby with a height 13 m is decorated with snow-white chandelier. The decoration of the entrance hall and the lobby was reflected national character structures such as figure stairway fence lines, marble floors, etc. The width of the stage is 48 meters, with the depth of 18 m. After the reconstruction, the seats in auditorium was 2567 while before there were 3000.

== Renovation ==
The renovation of the building was carried out in 2010-2011. The cost of it was amounted to 10.4 billion tenge. The entrance to the palace has been completely changed which updated the architectural appearance of the building. The external facade of the building replaced the old cladding with new materials, new windows, stained glass windows, doors, gates, repaired exterior porches and stairways, and an increased space in walls. Fire prevention measures have been provided in accordance with the new technical regulations. Another add on was the orchestra pit with three hoists and platforms for the storage of musical instruments. The building has been adapted for people with disabilities. Under the new health regulations, the kitchens were redesigned, the administrative and ancillary facilities have been changed which provided space for the backstage crew. In addition, to improve the quality of services, new premises have been provided for the building which included a meeting room for 50 people, a beauty salon, music store, recording room, flower shop, and recording studio. One of the main positive impacts of the reconstruction was the increased new land space for future use and the introduction of the parking space for cars.

== Cost of maintaining ==
After reconstruction, the cost of maintaining the Republic Palace has increased 13 times. At the end of 2012, administrative expenses LLP "Palace of the Republic" amounted to about 1.05 billion tenge, compared to 80 million a year before.

== Ownership ==
In Soviet times, the palace was owned by the government. Since the collapse of the USSR, the ownership was handed to the administration of city Akim named as CHP Palace of the Republic which it formed into an LLP with 100% of the shares from the city government.

In May 2014, it became known from the Approval of the Comprehensive Privatization Plan for 2014-2016, in which according to the LLP, that the Palace of the Republic will be sold into a private ownership.

In November 2015, a public information was made that the Palace of the Republic will be sold for 1 tenge.

== Monument status ==
On March 21, 2008 the status “Monument of history, culture, town planning and architecture of republican significance” was awarded.
