= Young Pioneer Palace =

Youth centers in the Soviet Union

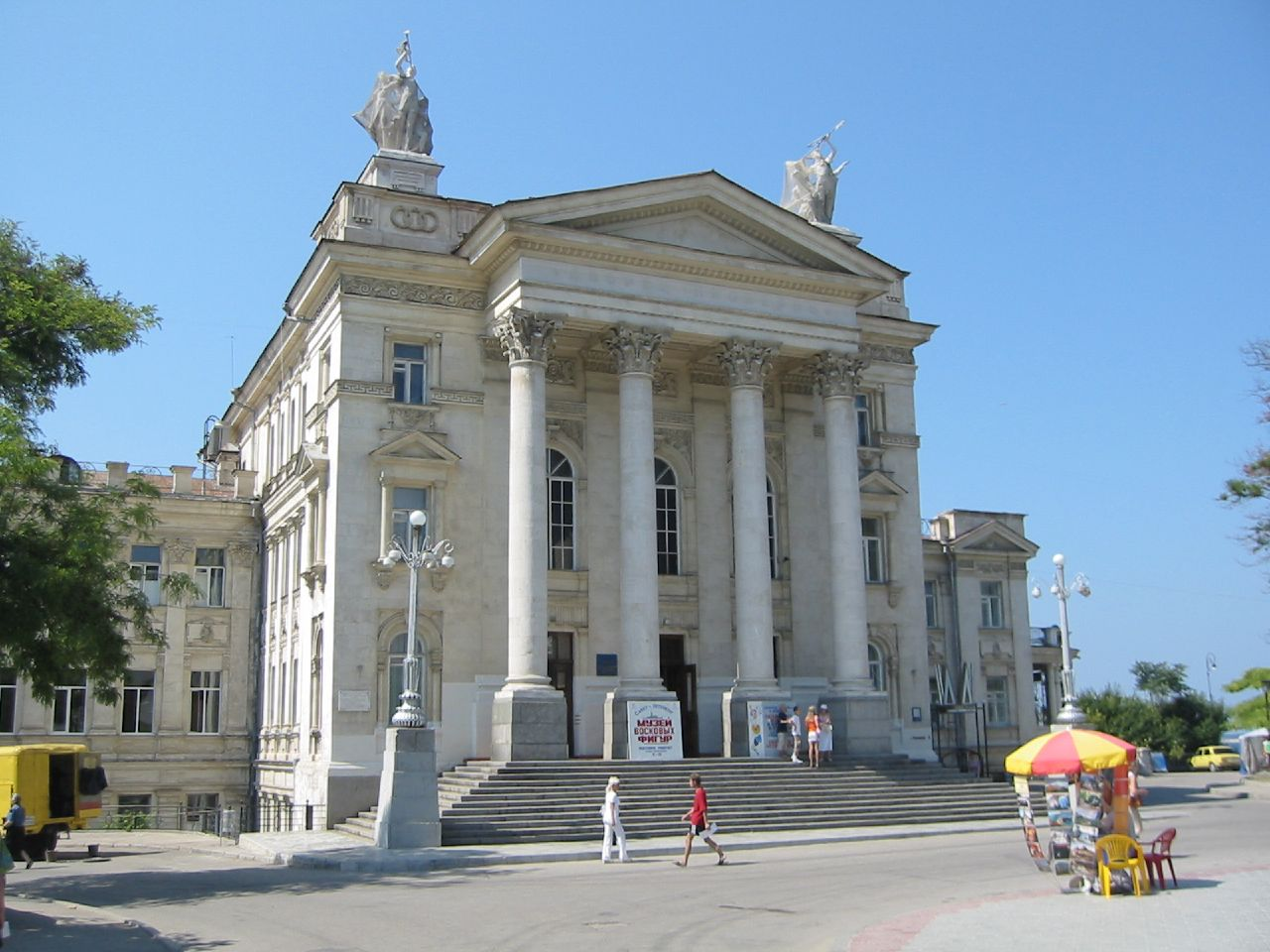
Young Pioneer Palace in Sevastopol

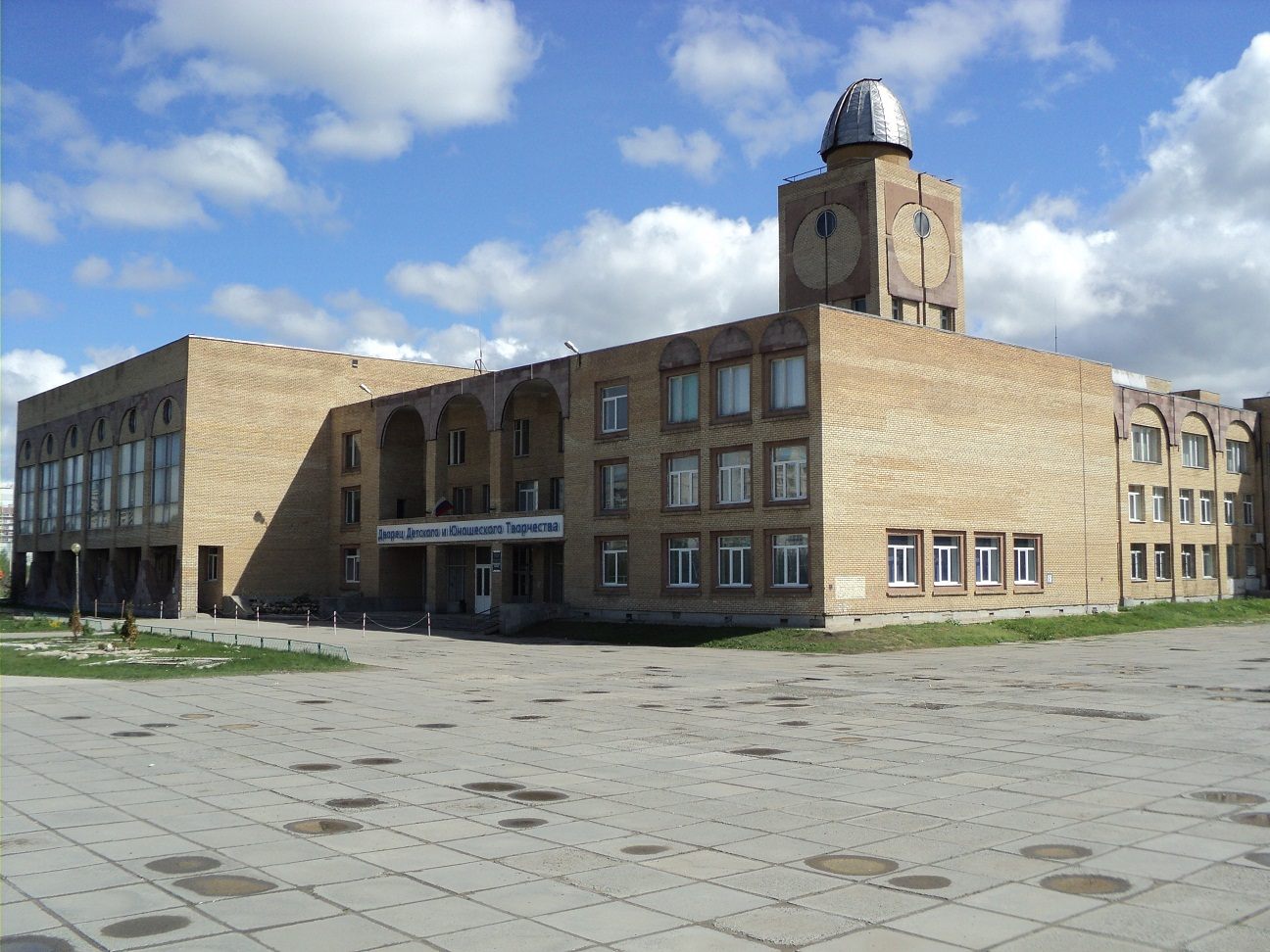
Young Pioneer Palace in city Tolyatti

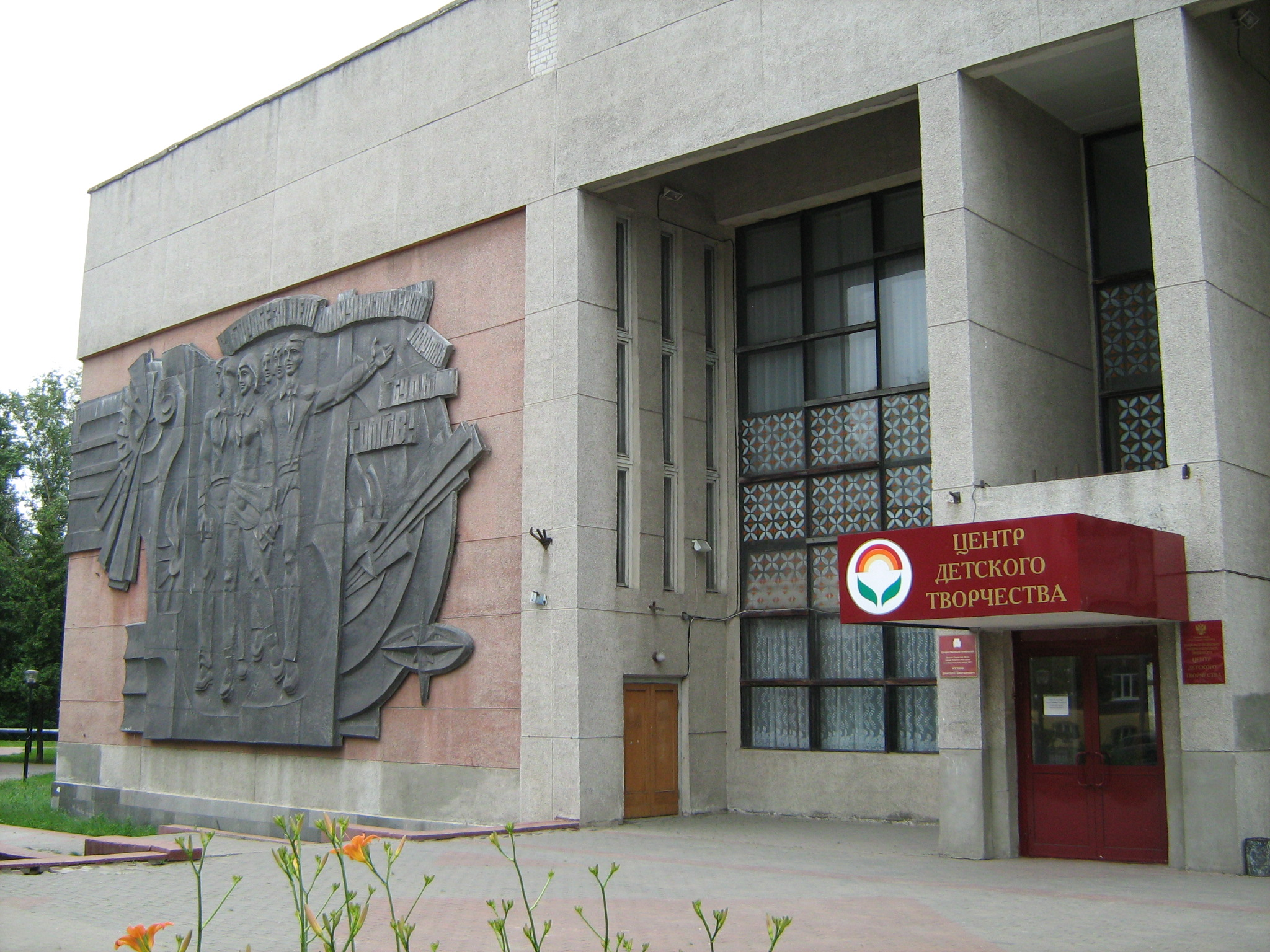
The former Pioneers' Palace in Sormovo, now renamed "Children's Creative Activity Center"

Young Pioneer Palaces, Young Pioneer Houses, Palaces of Young Pioneers and Schoolchildren were youth centers designated for the creative work, sport training, and extracurricular activities of Young Pioneers (primarily in the Soviet Union) and other schoolchildren. Young Pioneer Palaces originated in the Soviet Union. After the collapse of the Soviet Bloc and the Soviet Union itself, they were transformed into depoliticized youth extracurricular establishments.

== Description ==
The predecessors of Young Pioneer Palaces were established during the 1920s and 1930s in Moscow and later in Leningrad, Sverdlovsk, Tbilisi, Kyiv, Irkutsk and other cities and towns of the Soviet Union. The first Young Pioneer Palace was established in Kharkov in the former House of the Assembly of Nobility on 6 September 1935. In 1971 there were more than 3,500 Young Pioneer Palaces in the country. The early ones were organized at re-equipped palaces and personal residences of aristocrats of the Russian Empire, and were nationalized shortly after Soviet power was established in 1922. The former Anichkov Palace, for example, became the Zhdanov Palace of Young Pioneers in Leningrad, named after Andrei Zhdanov. The Zhdanov Palace was one of the best-known Young Pioneer Palaces of the Soviet Union. Newly built ones were constructed in the architectural style of ancient palaces until the late 1950s, when new architectural styles began to be introduced. Two of the largest Young Pioneer Palaces were built in the new style: the Moscow Palace of Young Pioneers, built in 1959–1963, and the Kyiv Young Pioneer Palace, built in 1965.

There were some essential differences between Soviet secondary schools and Young Pioneer Palaces. The latter consisted of specialized hobby groups and sections. Attendance was not mandatory for schoolchildren, and educational programs in Young Pioneer Palace hobby groups were designed so that they didn't duplicate school programs. However, there were also some similarities: hobby groups were organized by children's ages, similar to school classes, and admittance to Young Pioneer Palaces was completely free of charge. Educational work at the Palaces was designed to cultivate children's interests in labour, knowledge, development of creative abilities, professional orientation, and amateur talent activities. There were various sports, cultural and educational, technical, political, artistic, tourist, and young naturalist hobby groups in Young Pioneer Palaces. One of the main stated principles of educational work in hobby groups was: "Having been taught, now teach your comrade".

After the breakup of the Soviet Union, most of the Young Pioneer Palaces were transformed simply into centers for children and youth as part of the decommunization, others were closed, while in the Russian Federation some became strip clubs or casinos. Some reopened as youth centers, but admittance ceased to be free of charge.

Many Young Pioneer Palaces were built in Eastern Bloc countries and other Soviet allies during the existence of the Soviet Union. Some of them still exist, such as the Hanoi Young Pioneer Palace in Vietnam, the Ernesto Che Guevara Central Pioneer Palace in Havana, Cuba, and the Palace of Pioneers and Schoolchildren in Pyongyang, North Korea.

== Other Soviet entertainment complexes ==
- Palace of Culture
- Palace of Sports
- People's House, previous term that existed in the Russian Empire
- House of the Red Army (DKA)
- House of Military Officers
- Palace of the Soviets (special case)

== See also ==
- Education in the Soviet Union
- Young Pioneer camp
- Young Pioneer organization of the Soviet Union
- Children's Palace (China)
- Pioneers Palace (Almaty)
