= Arman (cinema) =

Coordinates: 43°14′31″N 76°57′27″E

- Арман
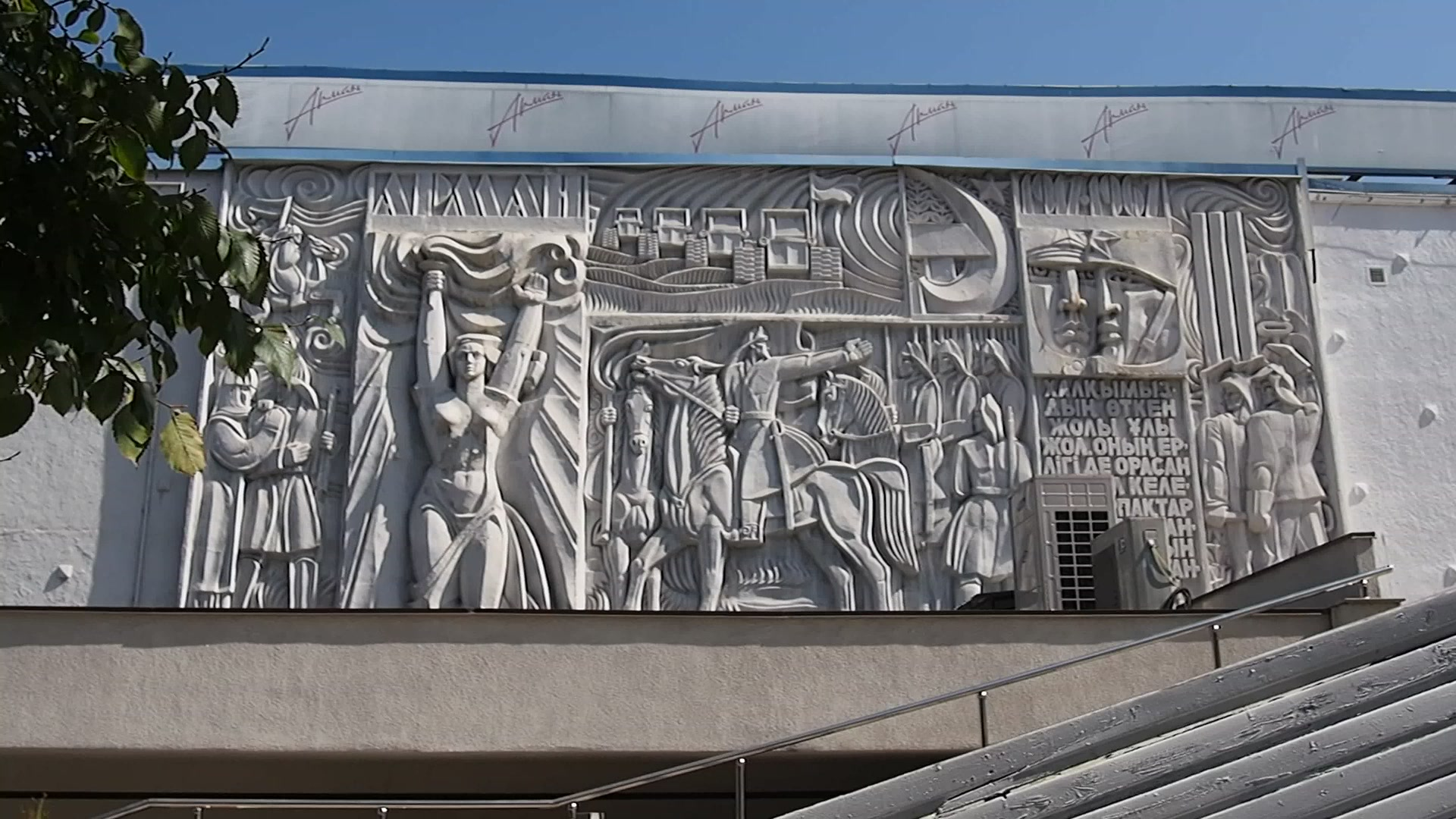

General information
- Location: 104 Dostyq Avenue, Almaty, Kazakhstan
- Opened: 1968

Design and construction
- Architect(s): А. I. Korzhempo, V.L. Panin, I.V. Slonovi et al.

Arman (Russian: Арман, tr. arman) is a digital four-screen cinema in Almaty, Kazakhstan, constructed in 1968. It has the status of cultural monument of local importance.

== History ==
The cinema opened to the public on 3 September 1968. In 1976, it hosted the first stereo movie screening in Kazakhstan.

In 1993, by decision № 316 of Nurkadilov, head of the city administration, the Arman and the Alatau cinemas were transferred to the "General Directorate of International Film Festivals "Kazakhkinofest" enterprise.

In 2000, the cinema building was reconstructed and given the status of an entertainment center, but city residents were dissatisfied with the reconstruction, since it was considered by them as an interference into the architecture of one of the city's historic monuments of culture.

== Architecture ==
The side facades are decorated with bas-relief sculptural compositions by muralist V. I. Konstantinov, reflecting Kazakhstani culture: figures of Amangeldy, Motherland, soldiers, a group of cosmonauts and a woman gathering the harvest. It is an example of Soviet public architecture of the 1960s.

The members of the construction project were: A. I. Korzhempo, V. L. Panin, I. V. Slonov; engineers V. Harvardt, V. Chuyko; artists V. Konstantinov, G. Zavizionny.

The cinema is a monument of architecture and urban planning of local importance, stated in Resolution № 1/191 of the Almaty City Akimat on 17 March 2021.
