= Dostyq Avenue =

Street in Almaty, Kazakhstan

Dostyq
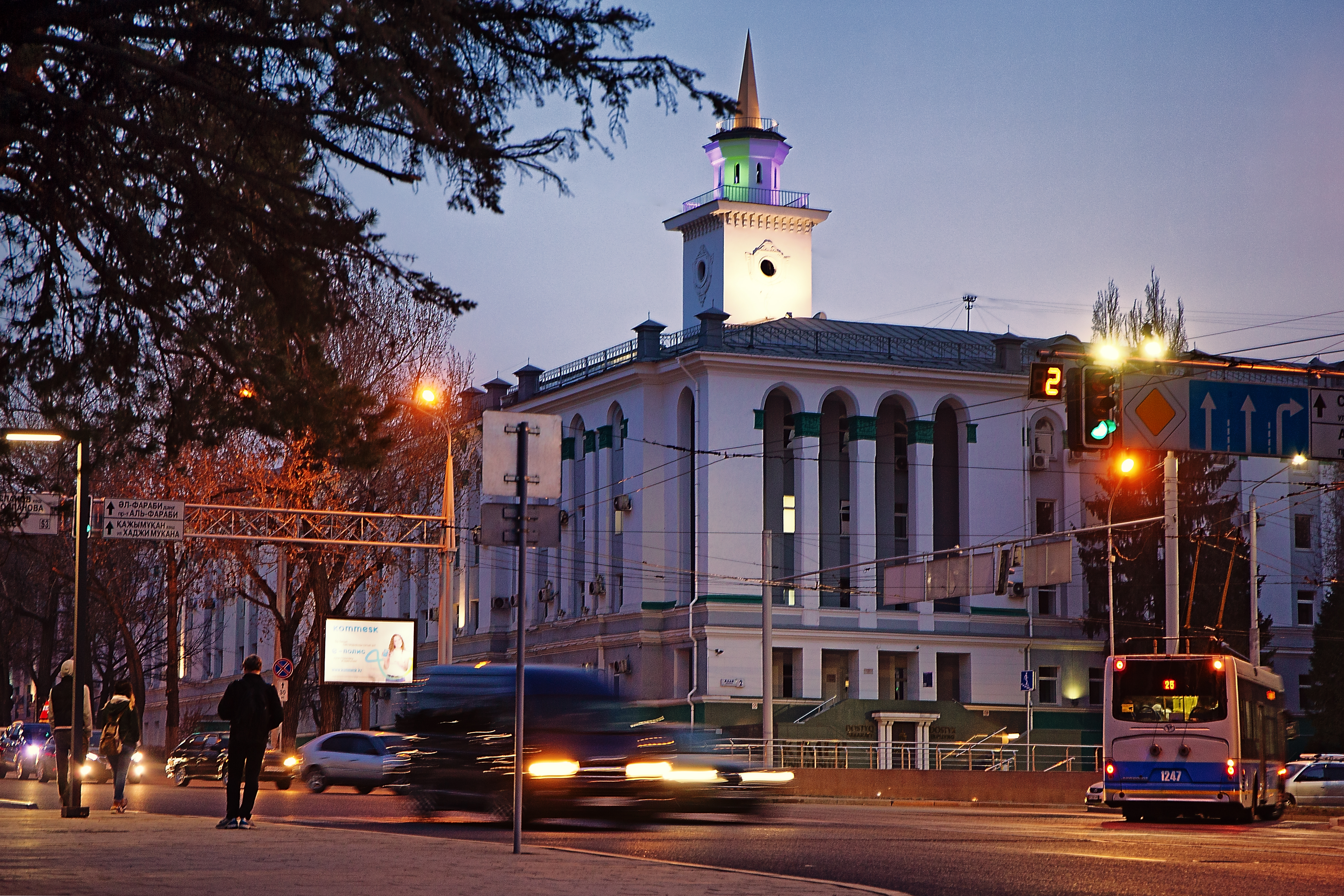
- Intersection of Abay Avenue from Dostyq
- Native name: Достық (Kazakh)
- Former name(s): Sobornaya (1870–1887); Kolpakovsky (1887–1919); Lenin (1919–1995)
- Length: 6.7 km (4.2 mi)
- Location: Almaty, Kazakhstan

Dostyq Avenue (Kazakh: Достық даңғылы; from Kazakh "достық", meaning "friendship") is an avenue in Almaty, the largest city of Kazakhstan. Many Almaty residents still refer to Dostyk by its Soviet-era name, Lenin Avenue (uletsi Lenina). The road runs from the intersection Qazybek Bi near Park of 28 Panfilov Guardsmen until it merges with Gornaya Street.

== History ==
The road was formed at the end of the 19th century from the Bolshoy Alma-Ata stanitsa to the Kargalinsky highway, later along the Small Almaty gorge in connection with its economic development. On the avenue, lined with pyramidal poplars and partially landscaped sidewalks, the main buildings and structures of Verny were: Gostiny Dvor, public meeting, post office and a telegraph; in the mountains there were mills, kruporushki, a brewery and a candle factory, a hospital, summer cottages. The street was named Kolpakovsky (Russian: Колпаковский) which was in honor of the Russian general, one of the main figures in the conquest of Central Asia.

After the establishment of Soviet power, the city council was visited by Mikhail Kalinin and the first party and public organizations of the city were created. In 1919, the street was renamed to Lenin Avenue.

In 1970, during the commemoration of the 100th anniversary of the birth of Vladimir Lenin, the memorial building of Lenin Avenue was completed. The district of the region, located in the southeastern one, is a link between the urban development and the surrounding mountain landscape, the city center and the zones of mass recreation for residents in the foothills of the Trans-Ili Alatau was the new sports complex Medeu. Thanks to the road, reconstructed in a highly rugged terrain, along Lenin Avenue it became possible to climb almost to the very glaciers with the height of 3100 m. On the avenue were created extensive courdoners and squares in front of the high-rise Hotel Kazakhstan, the Pioneers Palace, the House of Political Education of the Alma-Ata Regional Committee of the Communist Party of Kazakhstan, the Lenin Palace. The location of the facilities at the intersection with Abai Avenue and Brezhnev Square (now Republic Square) marked the beginning of the creation of one of the main urban development centers of the city.
