= Jeff Antoniuk =

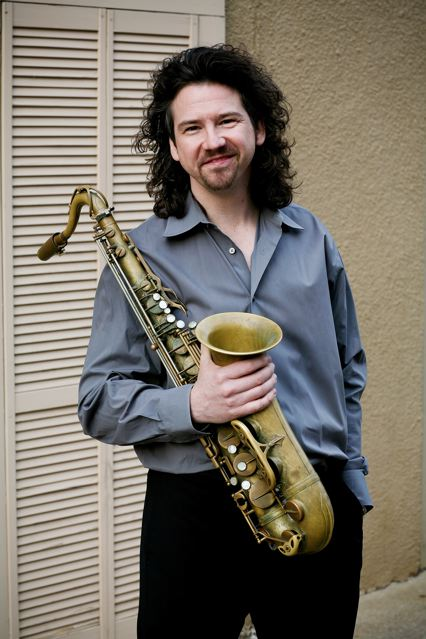

Background information
- Born: October 6, 1965 (age 60); Edmonton, Alberta, Canada
- Genres: Jazz, jazz fusion, funk
- Occupations: Musician, composer, educator
- Instrument: Saxophone
- Website: jeffantoniuk.com

Jeff Antoniuk (/ænˈtoʊniʌk/ an-TOH-nee-uk; born October 6, 1965) is a Canadian-American saxophonist and educator. Born in Edmonton, Alberta, Canada, he has lived in the U.S. since 1986. He directs Jazz Band Masterclass, inDepth Jazz, and Capital City Voices, which serve vocalists and instrumentalists. In 2005 he co-founded Maryland Summer Jazz, The festival is held in Rockville, Maryland.

== Education ==
Antoniuk holds a master of music degree from the University of North Texas, where his course work focused on jazz performance and West African ethnomusicology. He began his undergraduate work at Grant MacEwan University in Canada and completed his bachelor's degree at the North Texas. He is a recipient of the Canada Council for the Arts "B Grant," and used it to study with Blue Note recording artist Tim Hagans.

== Career ==
Antoniuk began touring internationally while a student at North Texas. He spent a decade touring and recording in the U.S. with the Unified Jazz Ensemble. Four of those years were spent as an Artist in Residence with the National Endowment for the Arts (NEA). In 2000, he won the Sammy Nestico Big Band Composition Award, sponsored by The Airmen of Note big band.

In 2004, he founded the Jazz Update quartet. It includes bassist Tom Baldwin, pianist Wade Beach, and drummer Tony Martucci. They perform their compositions in addition to music by John Coltrane, Duke Ellington, Billy Strayhorn, Thelonious Monk, Wayne Shorter, Joe Henderson, and Kenny Dorham. Brotherhood was released in 2010 and Here Today in 2007.

In 2013, Antoniuk co-founded The MARS 4-tet, a group of musicians from the east coast . The name is an acronym for the members' last names (Max Murray – bass, Jeff Antoniuk – sax, Frank Russo – drums, Donato Soviero – guitar). The band plays improvised music from the 70's, 80's and 90's and is influenced by John Scofield, Pat Metheny, Weather Report, and Keith Jarrett. The band incorporates rock from Led Zeppelin, Peter Gabriel, and Gino Vannelli. MARS released its first album, The Blind Watchmaker, in May 2014 on Summit Records.

In the U.S. Antoniuk has worked with Jamie Baum, Jeff Coffin, Zaccai Curtis, Jimmy Haslip, Leonardo Lucini, Allison Miller, Marcus Miller, Najee, Alex Norris, Mike Pope, Wayman Tisdale, Walt Weiskopf, and Kenny Werner; and with Canadian musicians Tommy Banks, Ralph Bowen, David Foster, Ingrid Jensen, and P. J. Perry. He has also appeared with Ray Charles, Natalie Cole, Bobby McFerrin, and Kenny Rogers.

== Educator ==
Antoniuk taught in the jazz program of Towson University for seven years, and developed his adult education programs to fill the hole he saw in jazz training opportunities for adults. This includes a summer jazz camp for adults (JazzWire Summer Summit, formerly Maryland Summer Jazz), ongoing jazz small group sessions (Jazz Band Masterclass), over 50 stand alone one-day workshops (inDepth Jazz Clinics) and an adult jazz choir (Capital City Voices). He is also a Master Teaching Artist with Washington Performing Arts Society (WPAS). Antoniuk is central to their Capitol Jazz Project, in conjunction with Jazz at Lincoln Center and Wynton Marsalis. Through WPAS, he has worked with over 10,000 Washington DC public school students. Antoniuk is also sought after as a private coach for amateur, semi-pro and professional musicians.

Antoniuk has become very active with online learning, running educational videos including an improvisation lesson podcast (Digging Deeper Jazz) on his YouTube channel, and launching JazzWire, an online community where jazz students work on lessons and support each other through their uploaded recordings.

== Teacher training ==
In 2016, Antoniuk launched a training program for jazz professionals (university professors, jazz recording artists and performers, and educators). JBM Teacher Training aims to help jazz professionals build their businesses and income through an approach to adult jazz education that Antoniuk developed and has been refining since 2003. This training is project-based, and done in teams, similar in structure and approach to the Socratic business school and law school model.

== Selected discography ==
As leader

With the MARS 4-tet

- The Blind Watchmaker (2013)

With the Jazz Update

- Brotherhood (2010)
- Here Today (2007)

With Unified Jazz Ensemble

- Make A Joyful Noise (1998)
- New Slant (1997)
- Small Town Stories (1995)
- Now We Are Five (1994)
- Unified Jazz Ensemble (1993)

As sideman

With Veronneau

- Jazz Samba Project (2012)
- Joie de Vivre (2011)

With Najee

- Rising Sun (2008)

With Alan Baylock Jazz Orchestra

- Two Seconds to Midnight (2003)

With Tad Robinson

- A New Point Of View (2007)
- Did You Ever Wonder (2004)

With Ben Patterson Sextet

- The Prowl (2003)

With Sound Connection

- Sound Connection Live (2005)

With Darrel Nulisch

- Times Like These (2003)

With Lou Pride

- Keep On Believing (2005)
- Words Of Caution (2002)
