= Köktöbe (hill) =

Mountain in Kazakhstan

- Kazakh: Көктөбе; Köktöbe; Russian: Кок-Тюбе
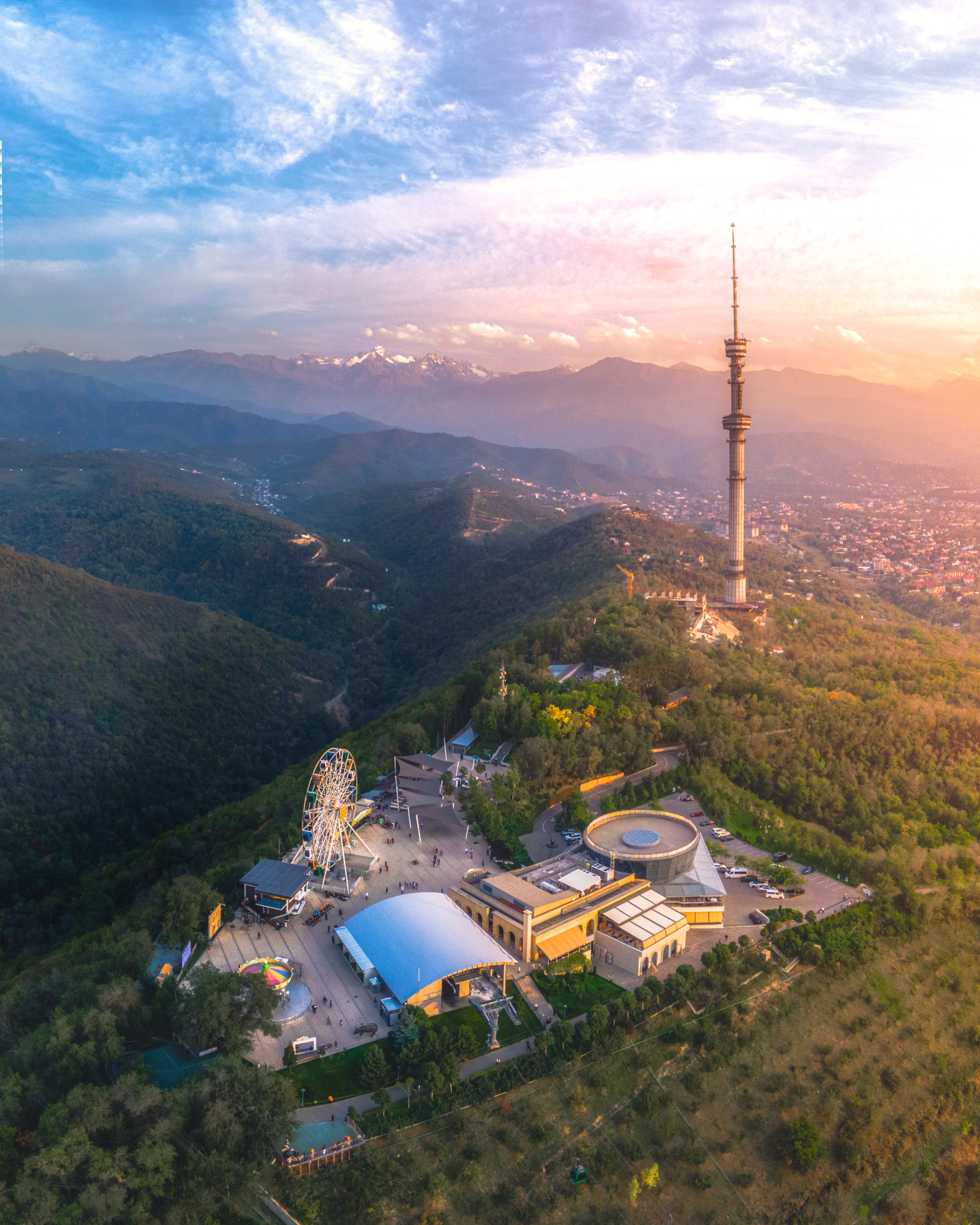

Highest point
- Elevation: 1,100 m (3,600 ft)
- Coordinates: 43°13′59″N 76°58′34″E

Geography
- Location: Almaty, Kazakhstan

Köktöbe (Kazakh: Көктөбе, romanized: Köktöbe, lit. 'Bluehill'; Russian: Коктобе, romanized: Koktobe) or Koktyube (Russian: Коктюбе) is a hill in Kazakhstan's largest city and former capital, Almaty. At 1,100 meters (3,610 feet) above sea level, it is regarded as emblematic of the city and one of its main landmarks.

Atop the hill is the Kök Töbe Recreation Area, featuring amusement park attractions, restaurants, and viewing platforms. The hill is accessible by road or the Köktöbe cable car, with the City Terminal located near Hotel Kazakhstan. The Almaty Tower, standing 372 meters tall, is located at the base of the hill and is visible from most parts of the city.

== History ==
Up until the 1960s, the Köktöbe hill was known as Verigina (Russian: Веригина). Prior to the Soviet era, the hill was a favorite gathering spot for city residents. From there, In the summer, they organized May Day celebrations, and in the winter, the hill was popular for skiing and sledding. Verny merchants referred the hill as the "Blue Hill," a name believed to trace back to medieval times.

In the early 1960s, the Ministry of Communications of the Kazakh SSR initiated a project to construct a television broadcasting tower that would serve the entire country. By 1975, plans for the new Almaty Tower were finalized. The goal was to create a broadcasting structure that could cover all of Kazakhstan while also becoming a significant city landmark.

Engineers chose the Köktöbe hill due to its high altitude (1130 meters above sea level, approximately 200 meters above the city). This elevation provided optimal coverage for the tower. The design was created in collaboration with the Moscow Institute of Central Research Institute of Cryogenics, and the architects for the project were N.G. Terziev, A.N. Savchenko, and N.K. Akimov. The construction budget was set at 600 million rubles, allocated by the State Planning Committee of the USSR.

One of the major challenges during the construction was the loose soil in the area. To address this, the tower was built with metal beams and aluminum sheathing to reduce its mass. The concrete base of the tower stands 60 meters high, weighing 45,000 tons (with a total design weight of 50,000 tons). Inside, the tower features a lattice structure made of metal beams lined with aluminum plates, and two elevators were installed in the shaft.

Construction of the tower began in 1978, starting with soil ramming and leveling. A 19-meter foundation trench was then dug, and asphalt was laid beneath the base for waterproofing. Upon completion, the tower reached a height of 372 meters, with the antenna mast extending an additional 114 meters. The tower initially broadcast six TV channels and four radio channels, covering 199 settlements.

In 2001, the tower underwent reconstruction, and after the upgrades, it began broadcasting 14 television and 14 radio channels. In the spring of 2004, heavy rains caused surface cracks and soil erosion, threatening landslides in the nearby residential areas. Then-mayor Zamanbek Nurkadilov closed the area to the public.

In the summer of 2004, work commenced on reinforcing the slope of Köktöbe. Illegally erected buildings, mainly cafes, were removed from the summit. Construction teams drilled and concreted 395 wells, up to 24 meters deep, to stabilize the soil. The cable car and viewing platforms were also restored.

In 2006, the hill was reopened with the addition of Kök Töbe Park, a recreational and entertainment center. The park features a Fountain of Desires shaped like an apple, along with playgrounds, a climbing wall, a ferris wheel, a rope park, and various other attractions for visitors.

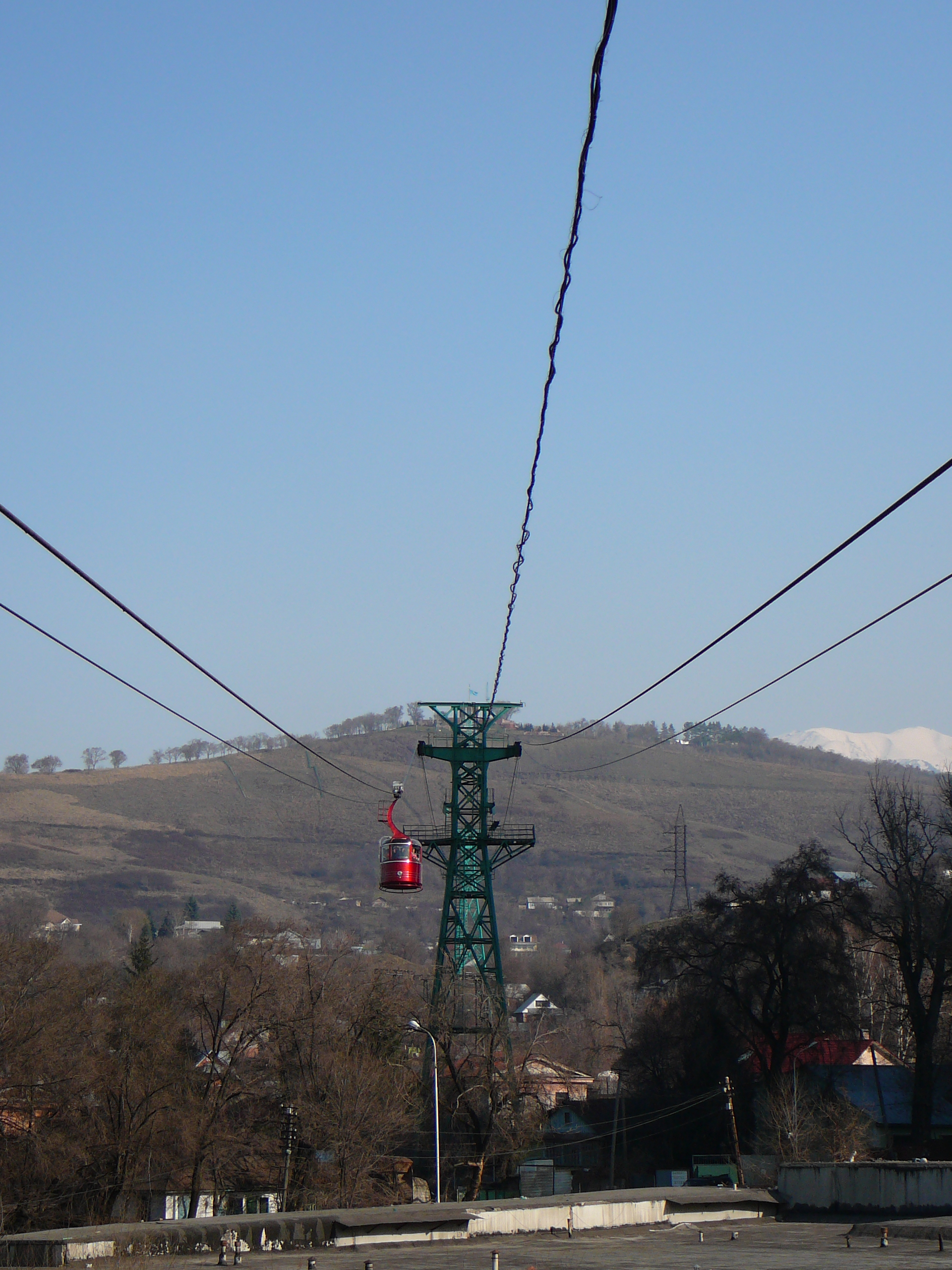
View of Kok-Tobe from the station cableway

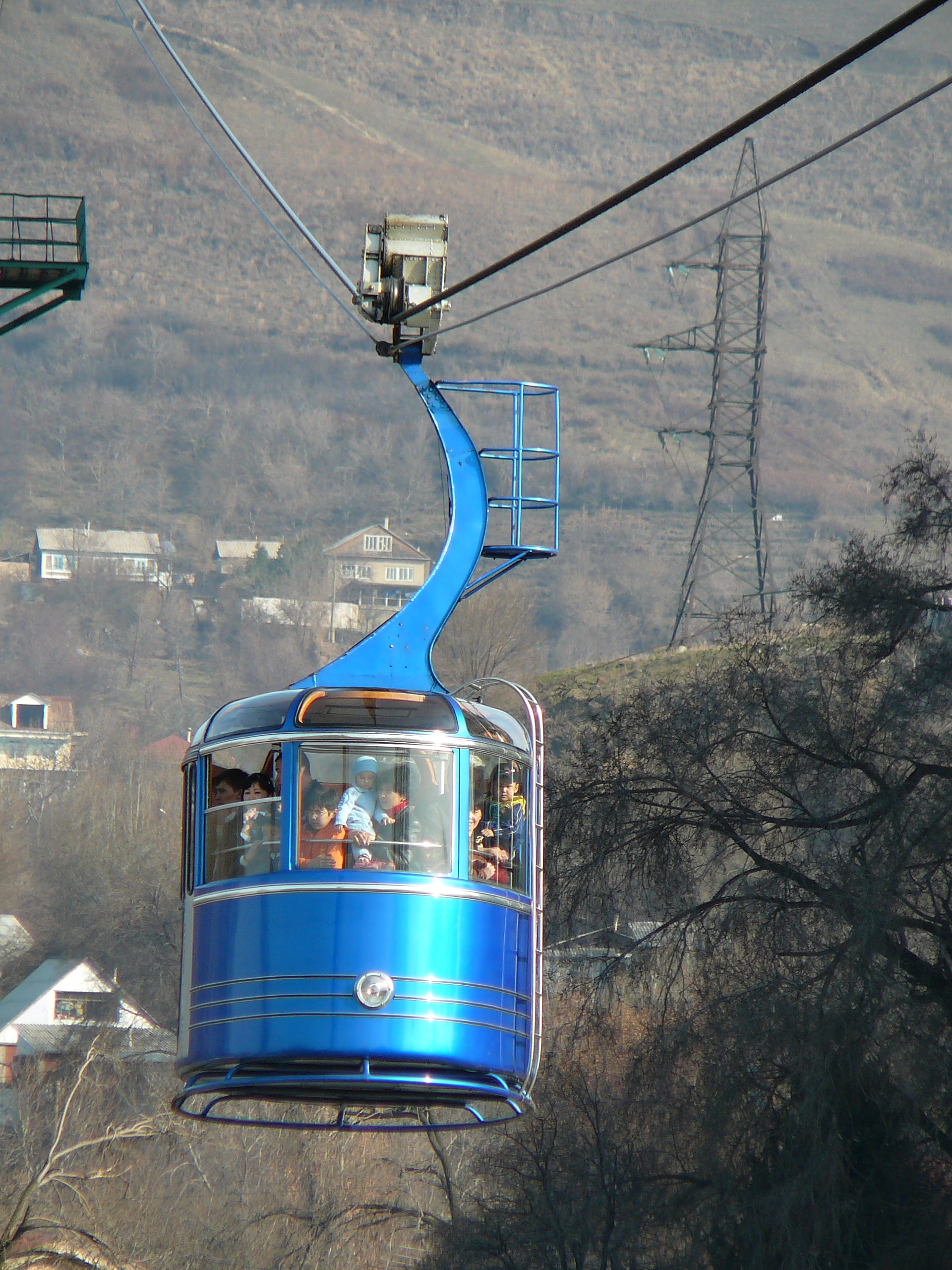
The cabin of the cable car on the Kok-Tobe

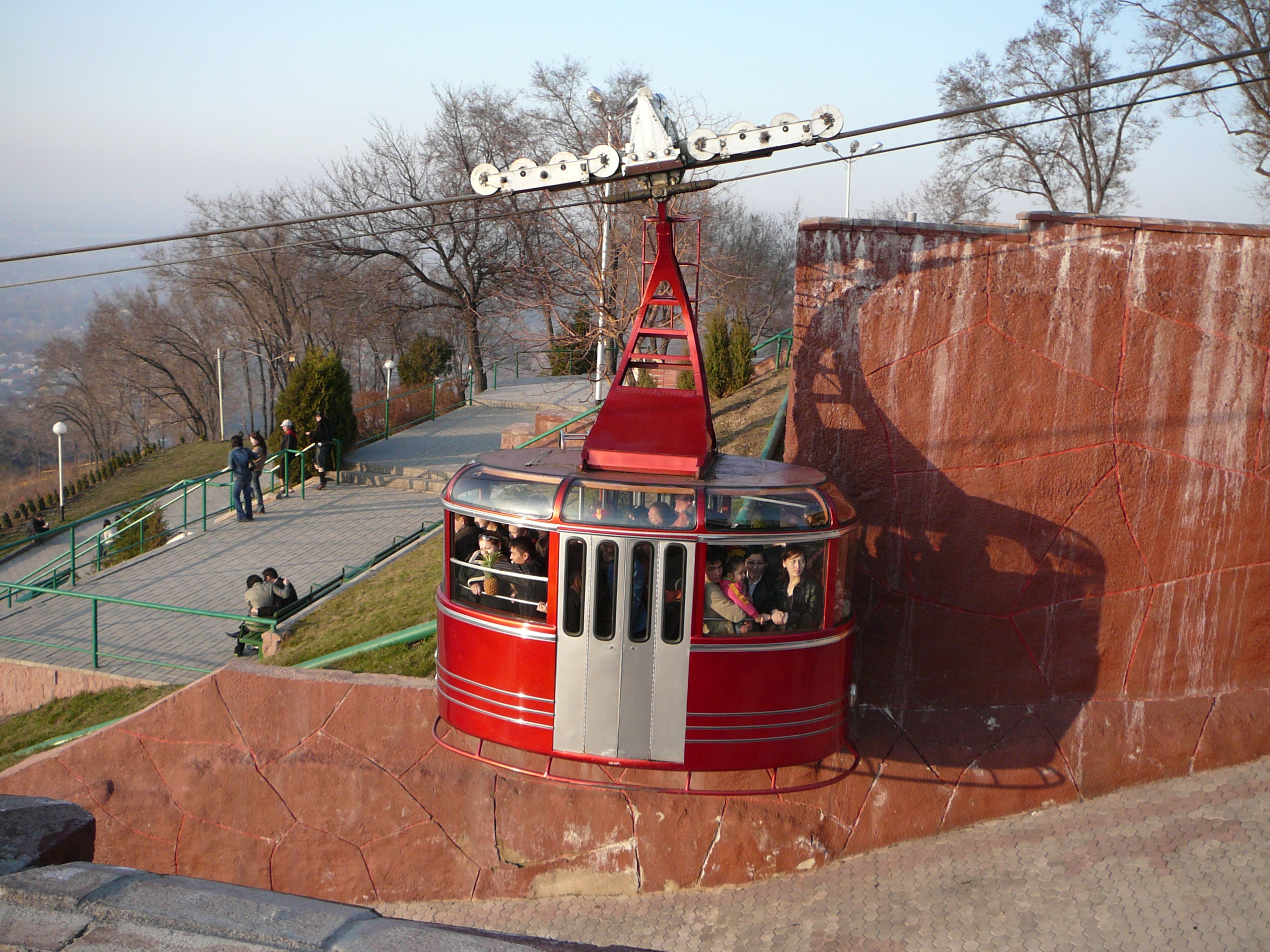
The cabin of the cable car near the Kok-Tobe

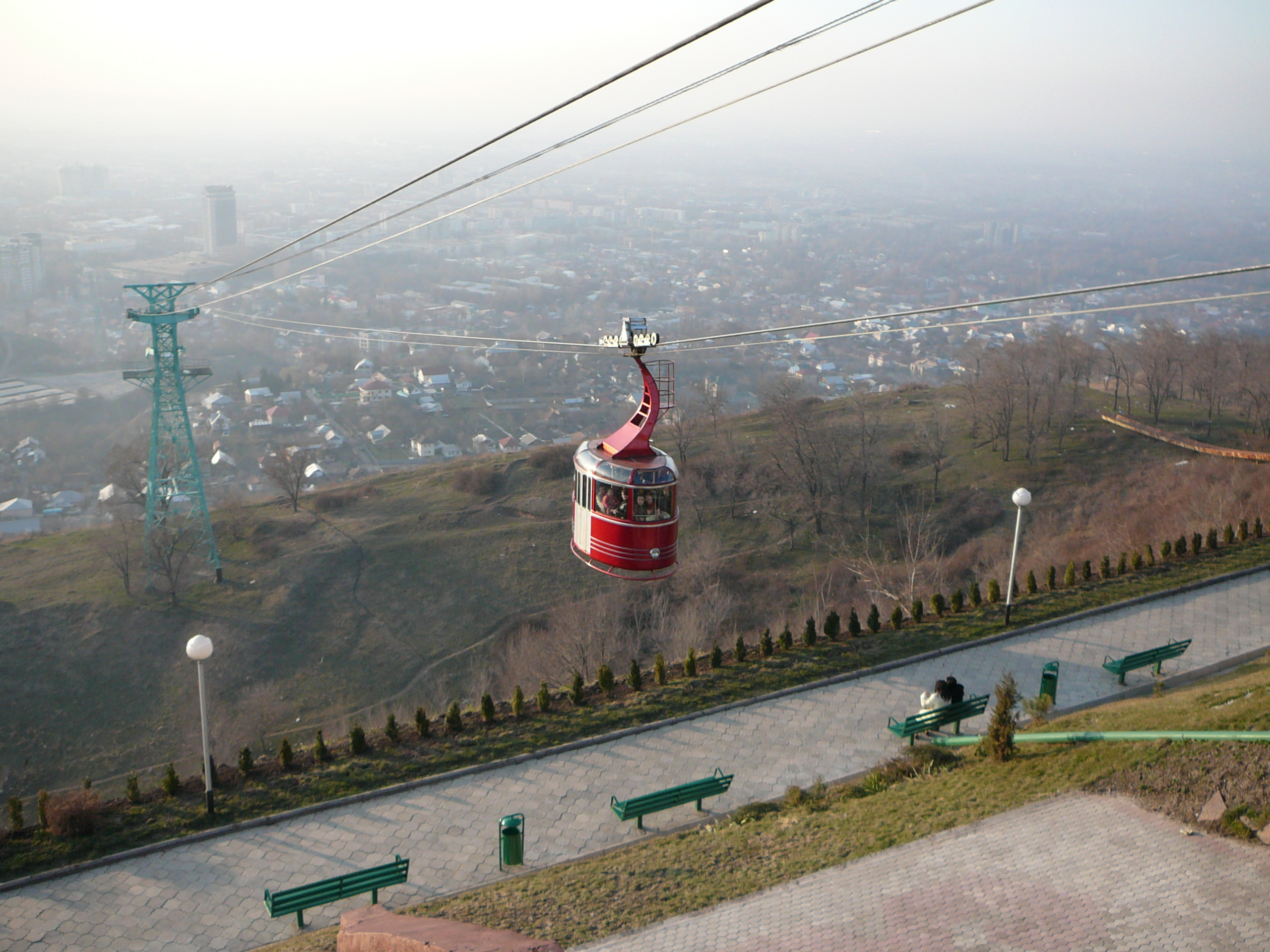
View of Almaty from the Kok-Tobe cable car station

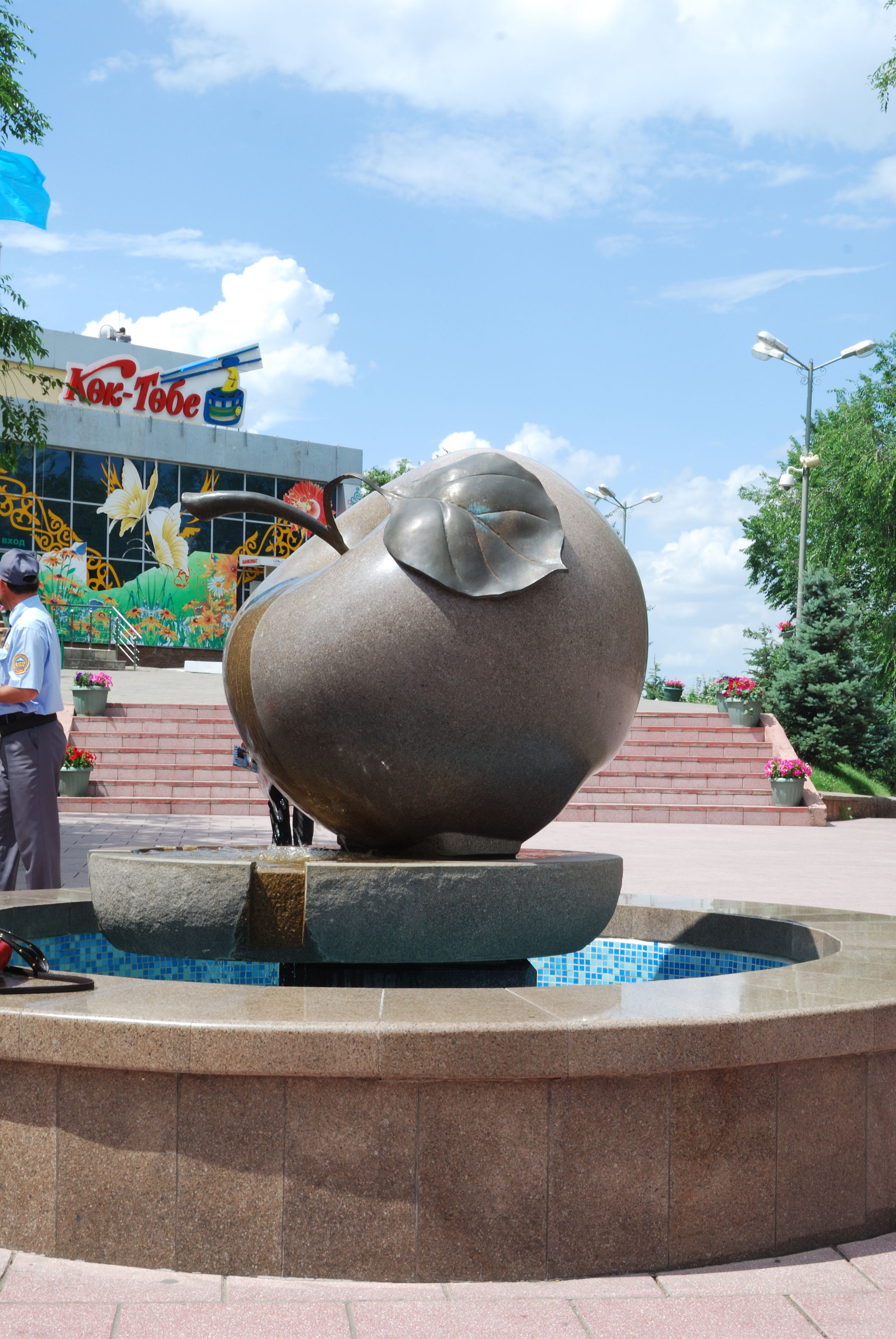
Fountain "Apple" on top of the Kok-Tobe. A place for visitors to make wishes.

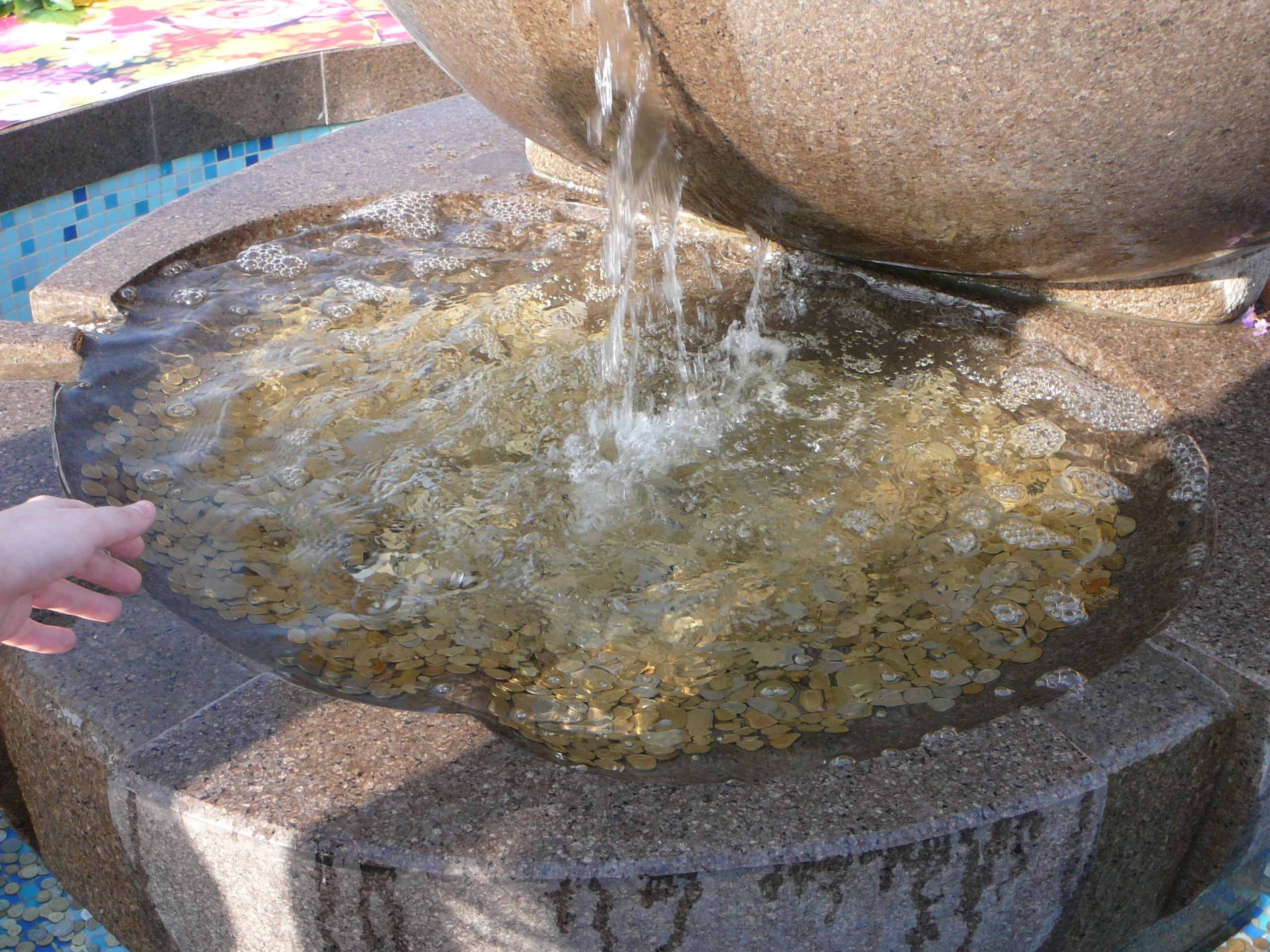
Bowl with coins left by visitors. Fountain "Apple" on top of the Kok-Tobe.

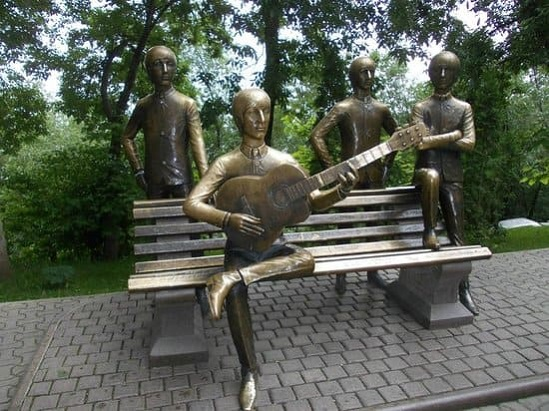
The Beatles statue
