= Almaty Tower =

Tallest free-standing tubular steel structure in the world

- Алматы Теледидар Мұнарасы; Алма-Ати́нская телебашня
- Almaty Tower in Almaty, Kazakhstan

- Location within Kazakhstan

General information
- Status: Completed
- Type: Steel telecommunications and observation tower
- Location: Almaty, Kazakhstan
- Coordinates: 43°13′44″N 76°58′34″E
- Construction started: 1975
- Completed: 1983
- Opening: 1983

Height
- Architectural: 372 m (1,220 ft) (rounded-off)
- Antenna spire: 371.5 m (1,219 ft)

Technical details
- Floor count: 7
- Lifts/elevators: 2

Design and construction
- Architects: N.G. Terziev, A.N. Savchenko (constructors N.K. Akimov, B.V. Ostroumov)

The Almaty Television Tower (Kazakh: Алматы теледидар мұнарасы, romanized: Almaty teledidar mūnarasy; Russian: Алматинская телебашня, romanized: Almatinskaya telebashnya), or simply Almaty Tower, formally the Koktobe TV Tower (Kazakh: «Көктөбе» телемұнарасы, romanized: «Köktöbe» telemūnarasy; Russian: Телебашня «Коктобе», romanized: Telebashnya «Koktobe») is a 371.5-metre-high (1,219 ft) steel television tower built between 1975 and 1983 in Almaty, Kazakhstan. The tower is located on high slopes of Kok Tobe mountain (Kazakh: Көктөбе means "green hill") south-east of downtown Almaty. Unlike other similar TV towers, it is not a concrete, but a steel tubular structure. It is the tallest free-standing tubular steel structure in the world.

The tower is 371.5 m (1,219 ft) tall; its 114 m metal aerial reaches 1000 meters above sea level. It has two observation decks at the height of 146 m and 252 m, which are accessible by two high-speed elevators. It is however not open to the public.

On the north-western wall of the tower, in honor of the launch of the Soyuz T-12 spacecraft, one of the largest mosaics in the city was installed, 20 meters long and 8 meters high. The authors of the mosaic, which displays satellites and astronauts, are unknown. The tower contains several tunnels leading to a bomb shelter.

== History ==
The tower was built by the architects Terziev, Savchenko, Akimov and Ostroumov. The design of the KM stage was developed in the department of high-rise structures of the Melnikov Central Research and Design Institute of Construction under the guidance of B. V. Ostroumov, with the participation of "Fundamentproekt" (Moscow) and the Kazakh branch of the "Central Research and Design Institute of Steel and Structures". The tower's structures were manufactured and assembled by the "Kazmontazhstroydetal" and "Kazstalmontazh" trusts of the Kazakh Soviet Socialist Republic's "Minmontazhspetsstroy".

The tower entered operation on 1 June 1984, having cost 600 million rubles. In October 1984 there was a fire in the tower: TV transmitter feeders burned due to errors in calculating the distribution of radio radiation power over the antenna panels.

== Reconstruction ==
In March 2012, the Ministry of Transport and Communications and the Akimat of Almaty signed an agreement on the reconstruction and modernization of the TV tower and the surrounding area, starting the following year. The plan involves opening the tower to tourists.

== Monument status ==
On 10 November 2010, a new State List of Historical and Cultural Monuments of Local Significance in Almaty was approved, simultaneously with which all previous decisions on this subject were declared invalid. In this decree, the status of the Koktobe TV Tower as a monument of local importance was preserved. The boundaries of the protection zones were approved in 2014.

== See also ==
- Radio masts and towers
- List of tallest structures in Central Asia
- List of tallest freestanding structures in the world
- List of tallest freestanding steel structures
- List of tallest buildings and structures in the world
