= IKS magazine =

Russian magazine

IKS (InformCourier-Svyaz) (Russian: ИнформКурьер-Связь, ИКС) is a Russian business monthly magazine devoted to telecommunications, mass media and information technology in Russia and CIS countries.

== History and profile ==
It was established in 1992 as a bulletin InformCourier. Among its founders are major Russian telecom businesses, such as Giprosvyaz, Intersputnik, and Rostelekom. The magazine is headquartered in Moscow.

In 1999 a closed joint stock company, IKS-Holding was formed to handle the publishing of the magazine. Today the magazine is only part of the company's business

IKS magazine is issued both in printed and online versions.
