= Kazakhskaya Pravda =

Russian-language monthly newspaper

Kazakhskaya Pravda (Казахская Правда) is a semi-monthly Russian-language newspaper printed in Almaty, Kazakhstan, with a print run of 5,000. As of 2004, the editor in chief was Aldan Aimbetov, a graduate of the Kazakh State University (Al-Farabi University). He has held that position since 1993. The United States' Country Reports on Human Rights Practices describes their political position as "nationalist". Pal Kolsto of the University of Oslo's Institute of East European and Oriental Studies goes as far as to call them "extremist". They are unusual among Kazakh nationalist-oriented newspapers for publishing in Russian rather than the Kazakh language.

== Political conflicts ==
Kazakhskaya Pravda was shut down by the General Prosecutor's office in April 1995 under the charge of "inciting ethnic tension". By September, according to the Minister of Press and Mass Media, the paper was allowed to resume publication. In 2000, Kazakhskaya Pravda was again in court, bringing charges against Irina Savostina of the Pokoleniye political movement, over comments she made during a television interview on KTK and which were also printed in the newspaper Soldat, in which she accused Aimbetov of being connected to the National Security Committee of Kazakhstan. An article in Kazakhskaya Pravda published in January 2004, "Kazakhs face a hidden threat", written by a non-staff writer of the paper, claimed that Uyghur immigrants in Kazakhstan were separatists and terrorists; it drew severe criticism from the Society for Uyghur Culture of Kazakhstan as well as the Kazakh government, and Kazakhskaya Pravda eventually printed a retraction, pointing out that their paper had always shown strong support for the Uyghur "national liberation movement".

== Conflicts with other newspapers ==
In 1998, an article in the newspaper Karavan accused Aimbetov of using his paper as a platform to publish antisemitic materials; Kazakhskaya Pravda filed suit against Karavan in response and won ₸260,000 in compensation. The April 2002 edition of Kazakhskaya Pravda featured in-depth content on another Kazakhstani newspaper Megapolis, accusing them of defaming the country's honour; Megapolis responded in an editorial soon after entitled "With such a patriot, Kazakhs need no enemies" (С таким патриотом казахам и врагов не надо).

== See also ==
- Media of Kazakhstan
