= Hotel Kazakhstan =

Hotel in Almaty, Kazakhstan

Coordinates: 43.2444°N 76.9574°E

- Kazakh: Қазақстан Қонақ Үйі, Qazaqstan Qonaq Üiı; Russian: Гостиница Казахстан
- Hotel during the evening
- Interactive map of the Hotel Kazakhstan area

General information
- Location: Almaty, Kazakhstan
- Construction started: 1975
- Opened: 1977

Height
- Height: 102 m (335 ft)

Technical details
- Floor count: 26

Hotel Kazakhstan (Kazakh: Қазақстан Қонақ Үйі, romanized: Qazaqstan Qonaq Üiı, Russian: Гостиница Казахстан) is the third-tallest building in the city of Almaty, Kazakhstan. It is 102 m (335 ft) tall, with 26 floors. It is situated in the southern center of Almaty. It is located on Dostyq Avenue, a major road in the east part of the city which runs all the way from Medeu to Panfilov Park, in the northern part of town.

The total area is 44,887.5 m^{2} (483,165 sq ft).

The building was erected in 1977. It is built to withstand the impact of an earthquake measuring 9.0 on the Richter scale. It is a famous landmark of Almaty, and serves as a symbol of the city. It is also the eighth-tallest building in all Kazakhstan.

In October 2018, architectural lighting was installed on the hotel building.

The "Friendship" public garden adjoins the hotel territory, where the Camels panel, a monument to Shamshi Kaldayakov and a fountain are located. Convenient access to the embankment of the Malaya Almatinka River has been arranged.

== Architecture ==
The building is a unique construction, built in a zone of 9-point seismic activity. The 25-story, ellipse-shaped volume is prominent. The central entrance is accentuated by a curvilinear canopy with a large overhang and illumination. The vertical row of bay windows, which gives the building lightness and openwork, ends with a high attic in the form of a golden crown. The structural basis of the building is a monolithic reinforced concrete core with transverse reinforced concrete diaphragms.

In the hotel lobby, a 34 m (112 ft) tapestry, "The Rainbow of Kazakhstan", has hung since the hotel's opening day. This tapestry was created by a group of authors: B. Zaurbekova, I. Yarema, E. Nikolaeva, and K. Tynybekov. In 1980, the group of authors of the tapestry "Rainbow of Kazakhstan" was awarded the State Prize of the Kazakh SSR named after Ch. Valikhanov.

Marble, granite, shell rock, and other materials were used in finishing and decorating the façades and interiors.

== Gallery ==
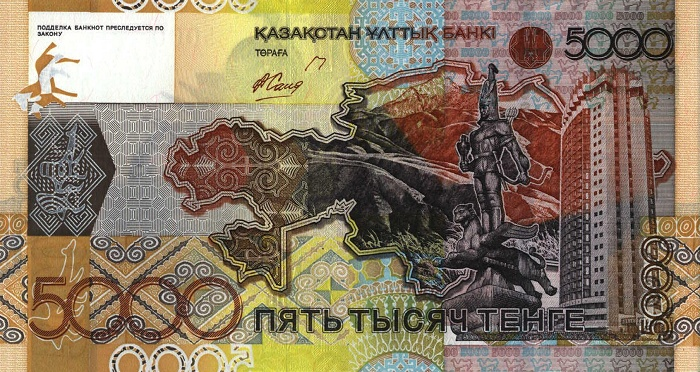
The Hotel on the modern banknote of 5,000 Kazakhstani tenge

== Monument status ==
On April 4, 2016 the decision of the executive committee of the Almaty city council of people's deputies #139 "On approval of the list of historical and cultural monuments of Alma-Ata" was passed, in which the hotel building was indicated.
