= Moskva (Almaty Metro) =

Almaty Metro Station

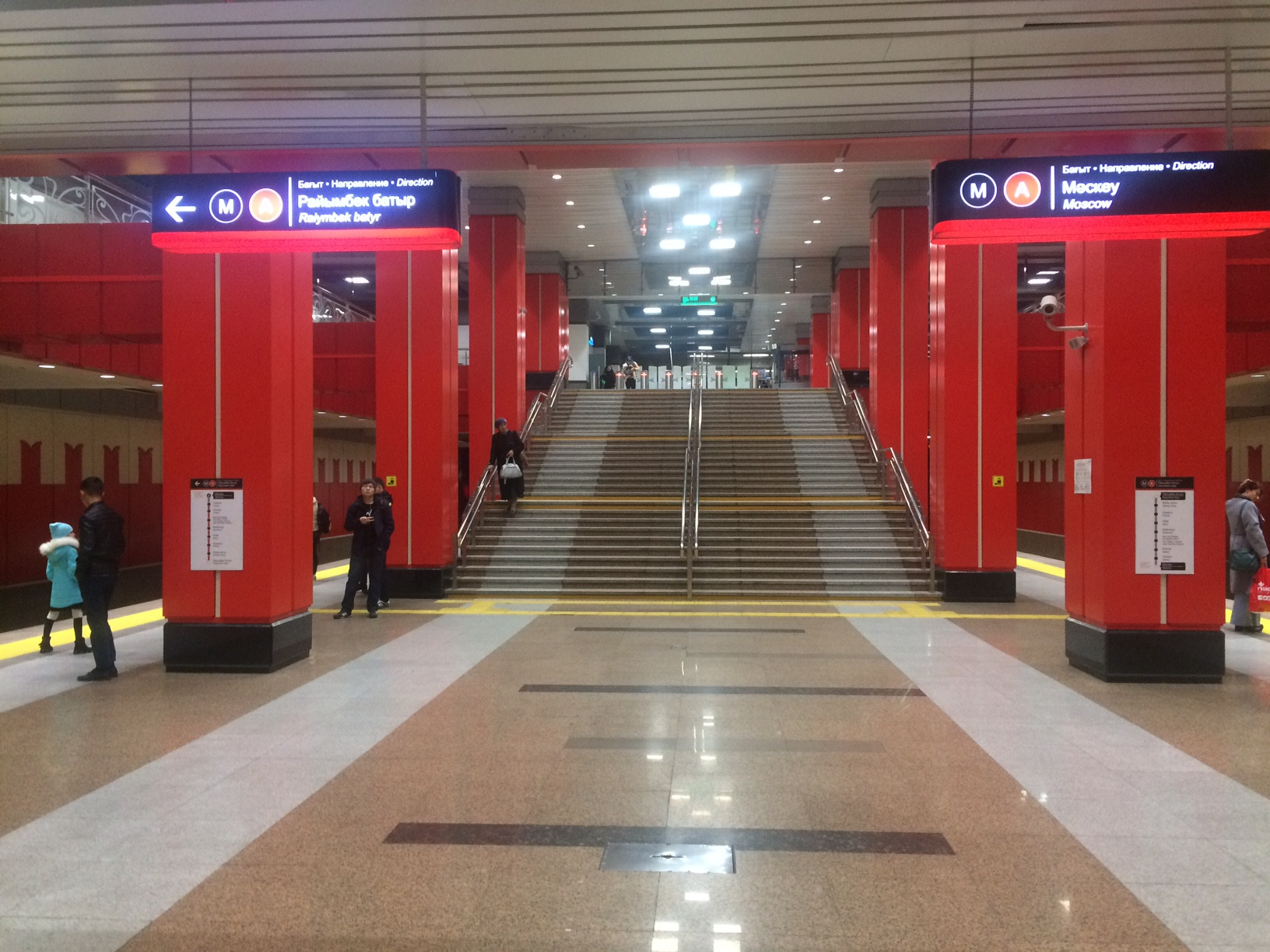

General information
- Coordinates: 43.229342°N 76.866112°E
- System: Almaty Metro rapid transit station
- Owner: Almaty Metro
- Platforms: island
- Tracks: 2

Construction
- Depth: 20 metres (66 ft)

History
- Opened: 18 April 2015

Services
Preceding station	Almaty Metro	Following station
Sayran towards Raiymbek batyr	First Line	Saryarqa towards Bauyrjan Momyshuly
Location

Moskva (Kazakh: Мәскеу, Mäskeu) is a station that serves Line 1 of the Almaty Metro. The station is located behind Sayran station. It was opened on 18 April 2015 as a part of the second stretch of Line 1 between Alatau and Moskva. It was previously part of the western terminus until May 30, 2022 when Line 1 was extended to Bauyrzhan Momyshuly.

The station is located west of the city center, at Abay Avenue east of crossing with Altynsarin Avenue. It is built underground and has one island platform.
