= Almaly (Almaty Metro) =

Metro station in Almaty, Kazakhstan

Coordinates: 43°15′06″N 76°56′49″E

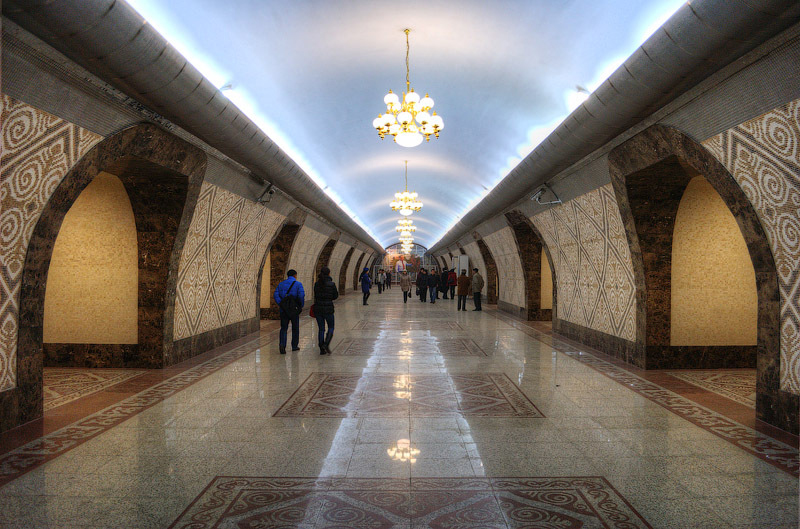

General information
- System: Almaty Metro rapid transit station
- Owner: Almaty Metro
- Line: Line 1
- Platforms: 1

Construction
- Depth: 30 m (98 ft)

History
- Opened: 1 December 2011

Services
Preceding station	Almaty Metro	Following station
Zhibek Joly towards Raiymbek batyr	First Line	Abay towards Bauyrjan Momyshuly
Location

Almaly (Kazakh: Алмалы, Almaly) is a station on Line 1 of the Almaty Metro. The station opened on December 1, 2011.

On August 10, 2010, construction workers at Almaly station went on strike after the construction company had failed to pay the workers' wages for three months.

It is located near the intersection of Karasai Batyr and Panfilov streets.
