= Qalqaman, Almaty =

Metro station in Almaty, Kazakhstan

Kalkaman

General information
- System: Almaty Metro rapid transit station
- Owner: Almaty Metro
- Line: Line 1
- Platforms: 1

Other information
- Status: Under construction

Services
Preceding station	Almaty Metro	Following station
Saryarqa towards Raiymbek batyr	First Line (planned)	Avtovokzal Terminus
Location

Kalkaman (Kazakh: Қалқаман) is a planned Line 1 station of Almaty Metro. The construction of the station started in April 2023 and it will be located on Ashimov Street between Elibaev Street and Bayzak Batyr at the intersection of Abay Avenue and Momyshuly Street.
