= Auezov Theater (Almaty Metro) =

Almaty Metro Station

Coordinates: 43°14′25″N 76°55′02″E

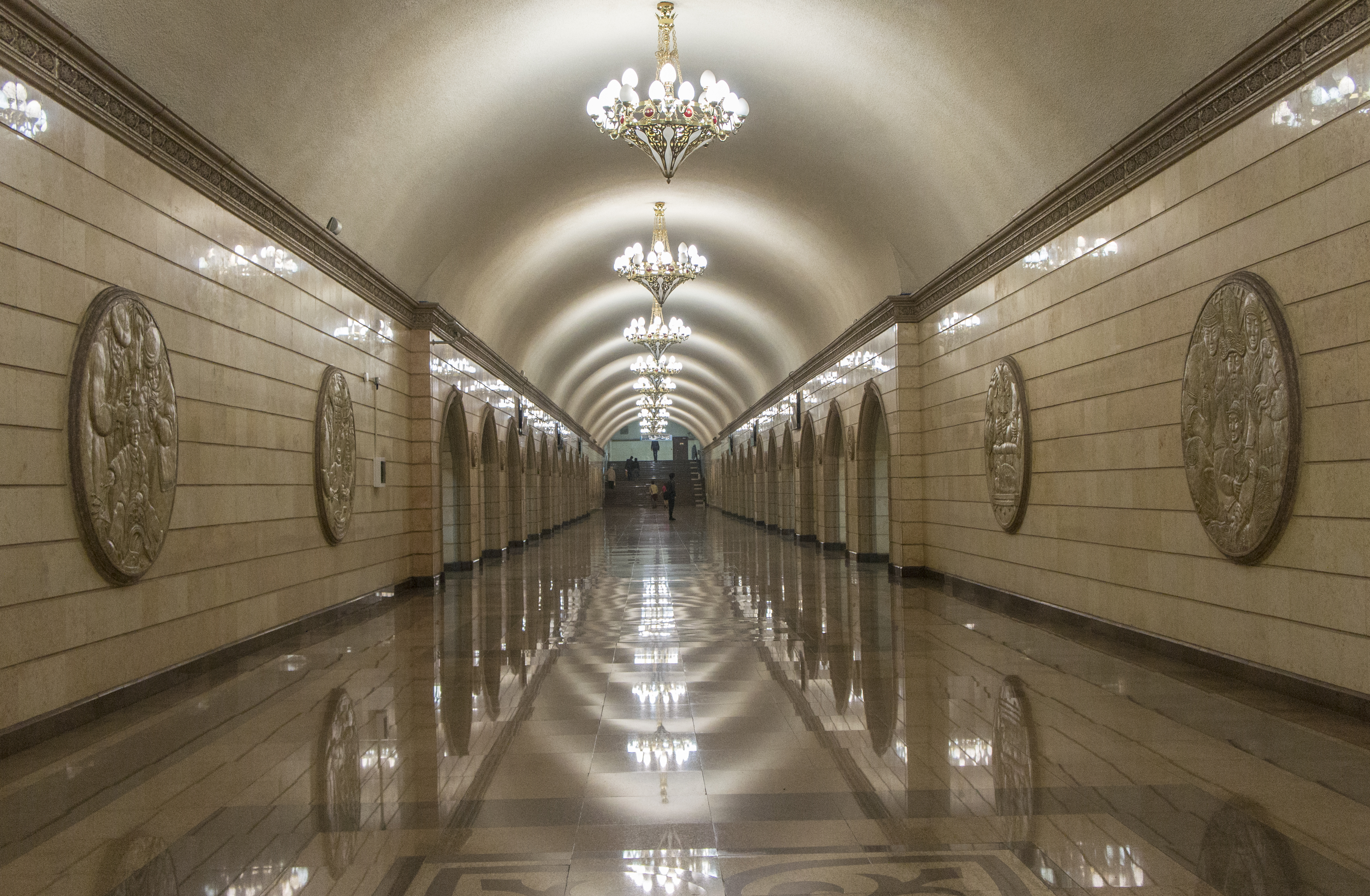

General information
- System: Almaty Metro rapid transit station
- Owner: Almaty Metro
- Line: Line 1
- Platforms: 1

Construction
- Depth: 30 m (98 ft)

History
- Opened: 1 December 2011

Services
Preceding station	Almaty Metro	Following station
Baikonur towards Raiymbek batyr	First Line	Alatau towards Bauyrjan Momyshuly
Location

Auezov Theater (Kazakh: Мұхтар Әуезов атындағы театры, Mūhtar Äuezov atyndağy teatry; Russian: Театр имени Мухтара Ауэзова) is a station on Line 1 of the Almaty Metro. The station opened on December 1, 2011.
