= Baikonur (Almaty Metro) =

Almaty Metro Station

Coordinates: 43°14′28″N 76°55′38″E

Baikonur Baiqoñyr / Байқоңыр
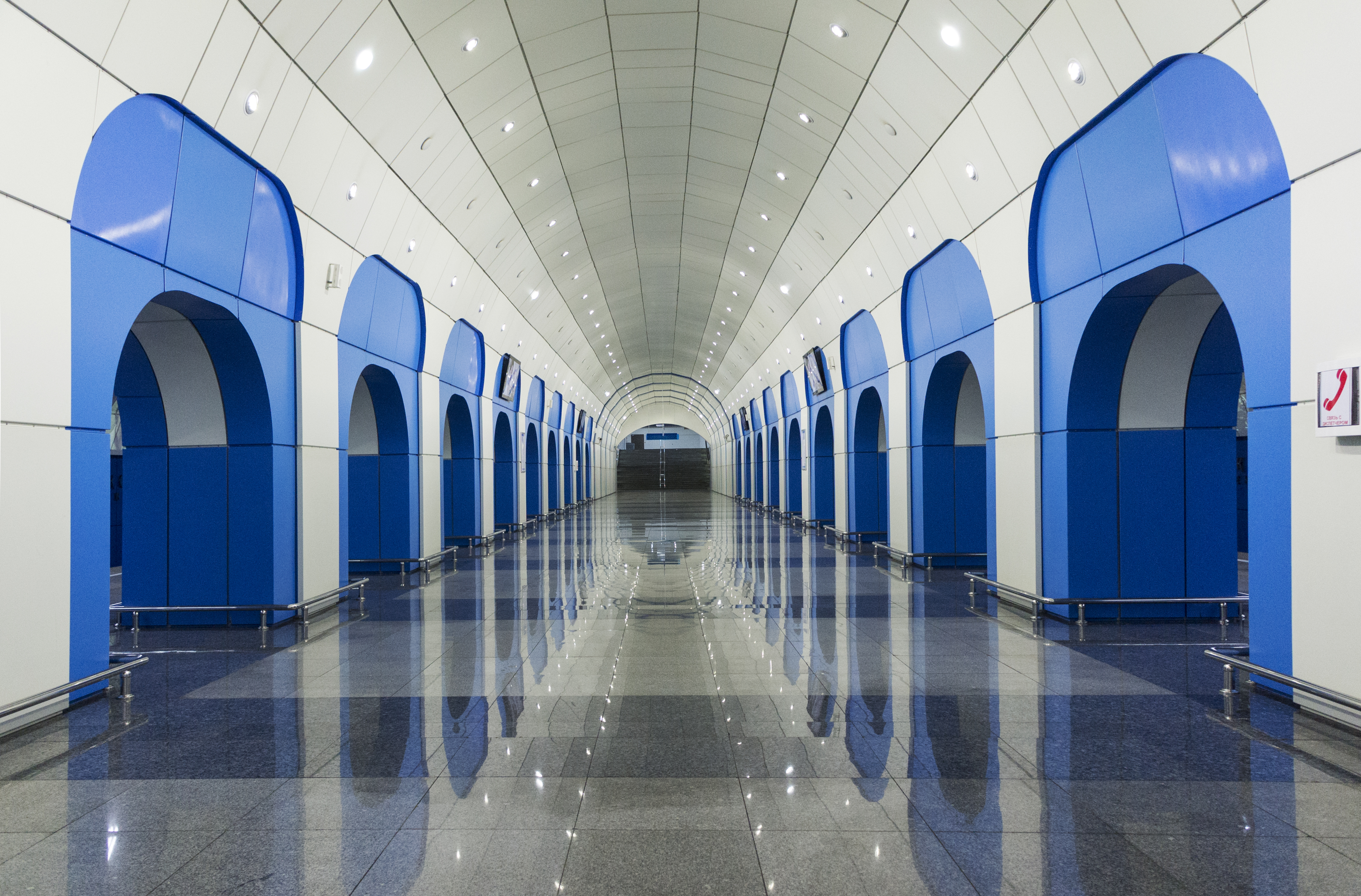
- Baykonur station is compared to other metro stations in "hi-tech" design with TV projections of space

General information
- System: Almaty Metro rapid transit station
- Owner: Almaty Metro
- Line: Line 1
- Platforms: 1
- Tracks: 2

Construction
- Depth: 20 m (66 ft)

History
- Opened: 1 December 2011

Services
Preceding station	Almaty Metro	Following station
Abay towards Raiymbek batyr	First Line	Auezov Theater towards Bauyrjan Momyshuly
Location

Baikonur or Baiqoñyr (Kazakh: Байқоңыр; Russian: Байконур) is a station on Line 1 of the Almaty Metro. The station opened on December 1, 2011. It is located near the intersection of Abai Avenue and Baitursynov Street.
