= Zhibek Joly (Almaty Metro) =

Almaty Metro Station

Coordinates: 43°15′43″N 76°56′45″E

Jibek Joly
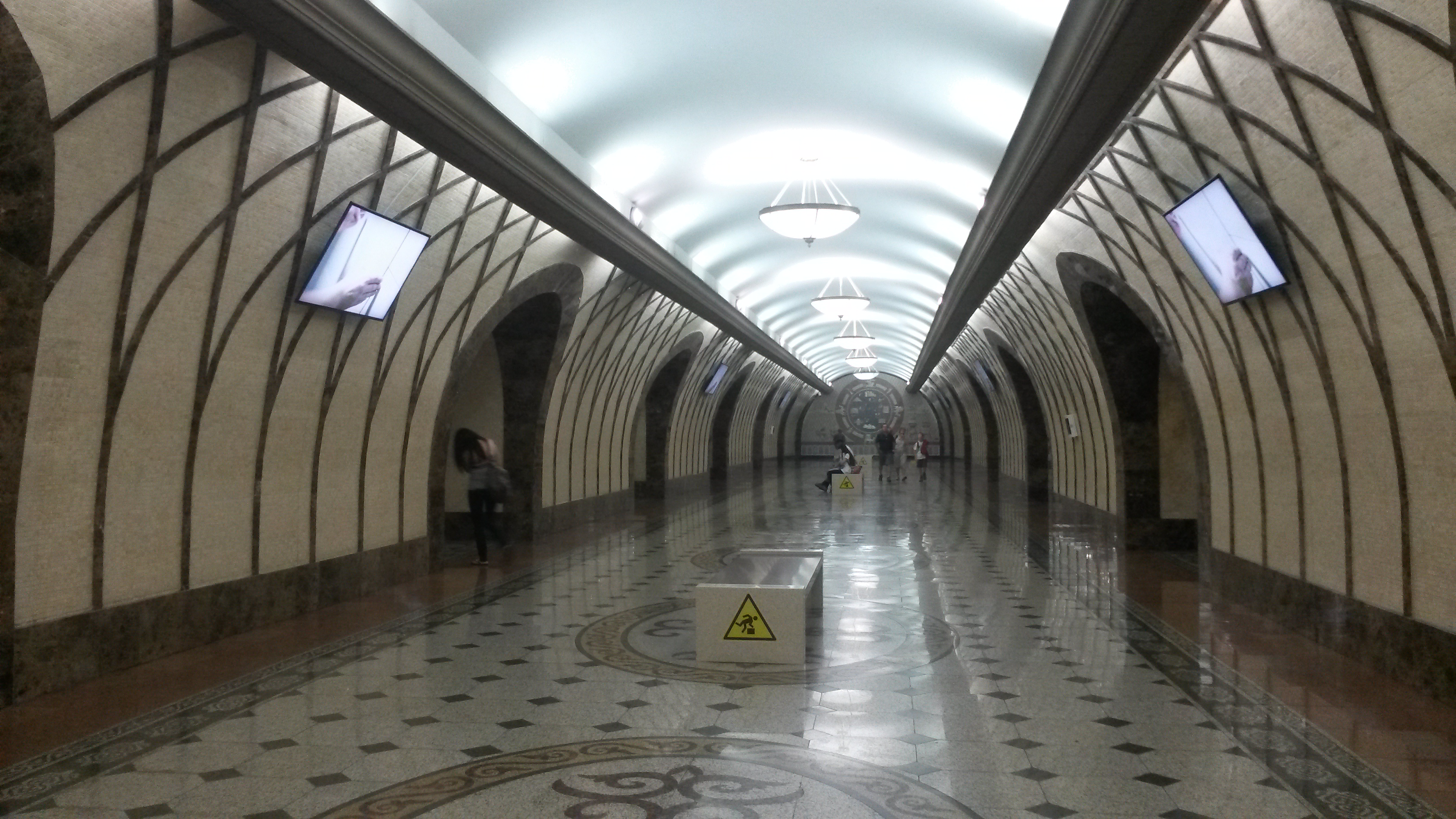

General information
- System: Almaty Metro rapid transit station
- Owner: Almaty Metro
- Line: Line 1
- Platforms: 1

Construction
- Depth: 30 m (98 ft)

History
- Opened: 1 December 2011

Services
Preceding station	Almaty Metro	Following station
Raiymbek batyr Terminus	First Line	Almaly towards Bauyrjan Momyshuly
Location

Jibek Joly (Kazakh: Жібек Жолы, Jıbek Joly; Russian: Жибек Жолы) is a station of Line 1 of the Almaty Metro. The station was opened on December 1, 2011.
