= Abay (Almaty Metro) =

Almaty Metro Station

Coordinates: 43°14′32″N 76°56′58″E

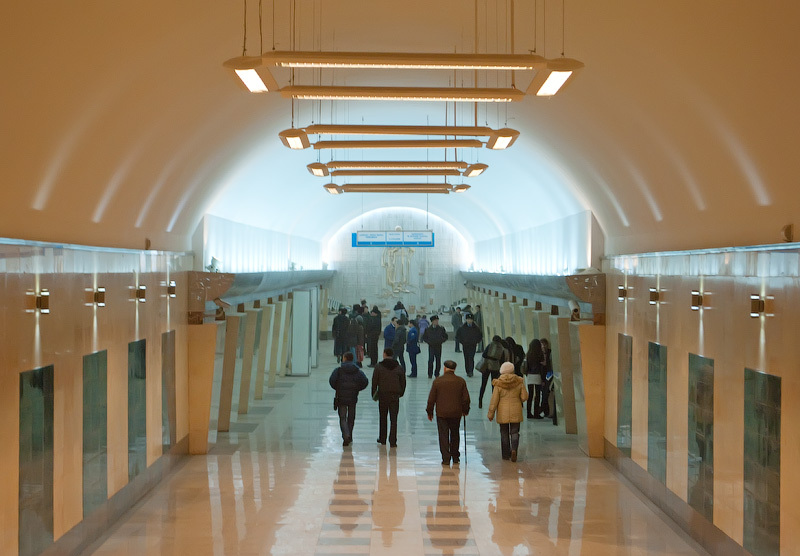

General information
- System: Almaty Metro rapid transit station
- Owner: Almaty Metro
- Line: Line 1
- Platforms: 1

Construction
- Depth: 78 metres (256 ft)

History
- Opened: 1 December 2011

Services
Preceding station	Almaty Metro	Following station
Almaly towards Raiymbek batyr	First Line	Baikonur towards Bauyrjan Momyshuly
Location

Abay (Kazakh: Абай, Abai) is a station on Line 1 of the Almaty Metro. The station opened on December 1, 2011.

It is the deepest among all the stations in the metro system. The station serves an area around Abay Square and Abai Avenue, with close proximity to the KIMEP University Campus, Kazakhstan Hotel and the Kok Tobe Hill.
