= Sayran =

Sayran - (Kazakh: Сайран, Sayran Russian: Сайран, tr. Sayran) - may refer to:

- Sayran Lake (or Sayran), in Almaty, Kazakhstan
- Sayran bus station, in Almaty, near Sayran Lake
- Sayran metro station, in Almaty, near Sayran Lake

== See also ==
- Shayilan Nuerdanbieke (born 1994), Chinese mixed martial artist (MMA), also known as Sayran Nurdanbek
- Sairan
- Sayran Ban, border crossing on Iran–Iraq border, in Penjwen district, Sulaymaniyah Governorate (autonomous region of Iraqi Kurdistan)
