= Sayran (Almaty Metro) =

Almaty Metro Station

General information
- Coordinates: 43.236895°N 76.878253°E
- System: Almaty Metro rapid transit
- Owner: Almaty Metro
- Platforms: island
- Tracks: 2

Construction
- Depth: 16 m (52 ft)

History
- Opened: 18 April 2015; 11 years ago

Services
Preceding station	Almaty Metro	Following station
Alatau towards Raiymbek batyr	First Line	Moskva towards Bauyrjan Momyshuly
Location

Sayran (Kazakh: Сайран, Sairan) is a station on Line 1 of the Almaty Metro. The station is located between Alatau and Moskva. It was opened on 18 April 2015 as a part of the second stretch of Line 1 between Alatau and Moskva.

The station is located west of the city center, at the intersection between Abay Avenue and Brusilovsky Street. It is built underground and has one island platform. The name of the station originates from the Sayran Reservoir, which is located about 1 km (0.62 mi) northwest of the station.
