= Alatau (Almaty Metro) =

Almaty Metro Station

Coordinates: 43°14′19″N 76°53′48″E

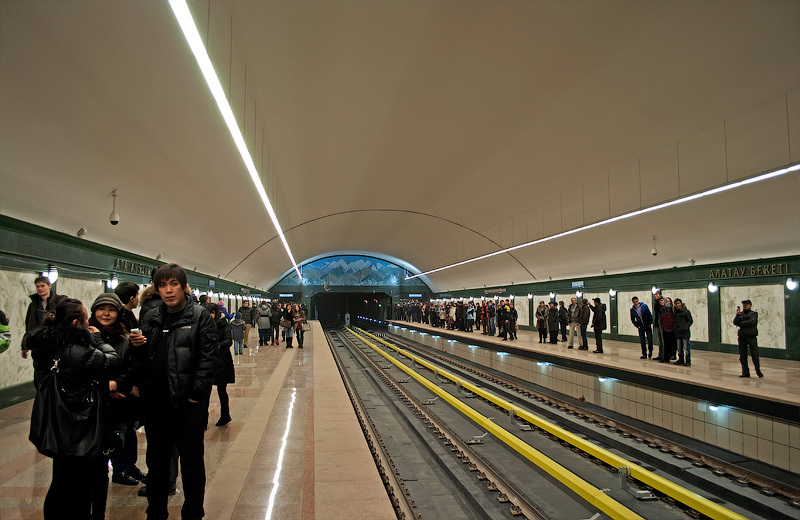

General information
- System: Almaty Metro rapid transit station
- Owner: Almaty Metro
- Line: Line 1
- Tracks: 2

Construction
- Depth: 11.6m

History
- Opened: 1 December 2011

Services
Preceding station	Almaty Metro	Following station
Auezov Theater towards Raiymbek batyr	First Line	Sayran towards Bauyrjan Momyshuly
Location

Alatau (Kazakh: Алатау, Alatau) is a metro station located in Almaty, Kazakhstan. The station opened on December 1, 2011, and is on Line 1 of the Almaty Metro rapid transit system.

The walls are made from green and white marble and the floors are grey granite. At the ends of the platform are panels made of Roman mosaic, bronze and relief depicting the mountain range of the Trans-Ili Alatau.
