= Saryarka =

Saryarka or Saryarqa may refer to:

- Kazakh Uplands (Kazakh: Сарыарқа, Saryarqa), a large grassland in Kazakhstan
  - Saryarka – Steppe and Lakes of Northern Kazakhstan, a UNESCO World Heritage Site in the Kazakh Uplands
- Sary-Arka Airport, Karagandy, Kazakhstan
- Saryarka Karagandy, an ice hockey team from Karagandy, Kazakhstan
- Saryarka Velodrome, a cycle-racing arena in Astana, Kazakhstan
- Saryarqa (Almaty Metro), a railway station in Almaty, Kazakhstan
