= Saryarqa (Almaty Metro) =

Metro station in Almaty, Kazakhstan

Saryarka
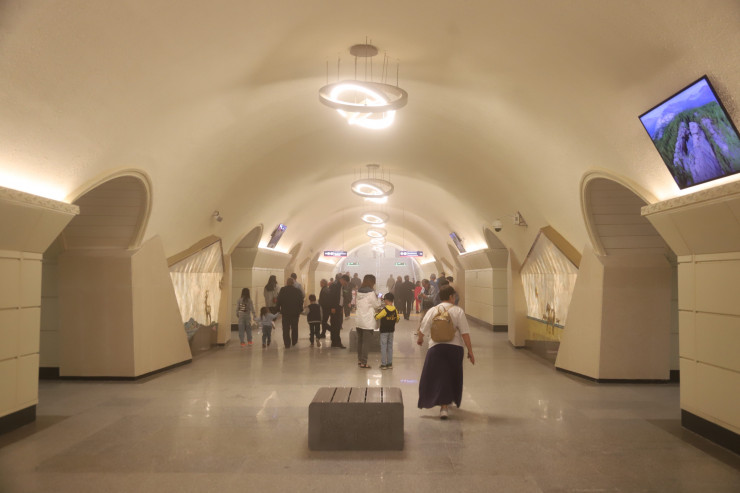

General information
- Coordinates: 43.2237°N 76.8582°E
- System: Almaty Metro rapid transit station
- Owner: Almaty Metro
- Line: Line 1
- Platforms: 1

Other information
- Status: Open

History
- Opening: 30 May 2022

Services
| Preceding station | Almaty Metro | Following station |
|---|---|---|
| Moskva towards Raiymbek batyr | First Line | Bauyrjan Momyshuly Terminus |
Location

Saryarka (Kazakh: Сарыарқа; Russian: Сары-Арка) is a station along Line 1 of the Almaty Metro in Almaty, Kazakhstan that was opened on 30 May 2022. It was originally planned to be opened in 2018, however the completion date was moved to 2022. The station is located near Family Park.
