= Almaty Light Rail =

Light rail line serving Almaty, Kazakhstan

Overview
- Area served: Almaty, Kazakhstan
- Transit type: Light rail
- Number of lines: 1
- Number of stations: 37

Operation
- Operation will start: 2027
- Number of vehicles: 12

Technical
- System length: 22.7 km (14.1 mi)
- Track gauge: 1,435 mm (4 ft 8 1/2 in) standard gauge

The Almaty Light Rail is a light rail line planned to serve Kazakhstan's largest city Almaty.

== Background ==
Trams in Almaty served the city between 1937 and 2015. It was one of the four tramways of Kazakhstan which continuously operated from their opening dates. The network went into decline starting in the late 20th century, with most of its former routes closed by 2010. Operation of the remaining tram network was halted and indefinitely suspended on 31 October 2015.

In 2011, the first section of a metro opened between Raiymbek Batyr and Alatau was constructed. Soon after this, in 2016 the next section of the line was completed to Moskva. Finally, in 2022, the section to Bauyrzhan Momyshuly was completed. The system runs seven 4-car trains, produced by Hyundai Rotem of South Korea. Plans for a second line are underway.

== Route ==
The 22.7 km (14.1 mi) line contains 36 stations and a depot in the Alatau district. The line links Almaty’s principal avenues, passing through Momyshuly and Töle Bi Street, Panfilov street to Astana Square, and down Makatayev and Zhetysuskaya streets.

== See also ==
- Almaty Metro
- Trams in Almaty
- Astana Metro
