= Sayran Bus Station =

Bus station in Almaty, Kazakhstan

Coordinates: 43°14′41.2″N 76°51′30.0″E

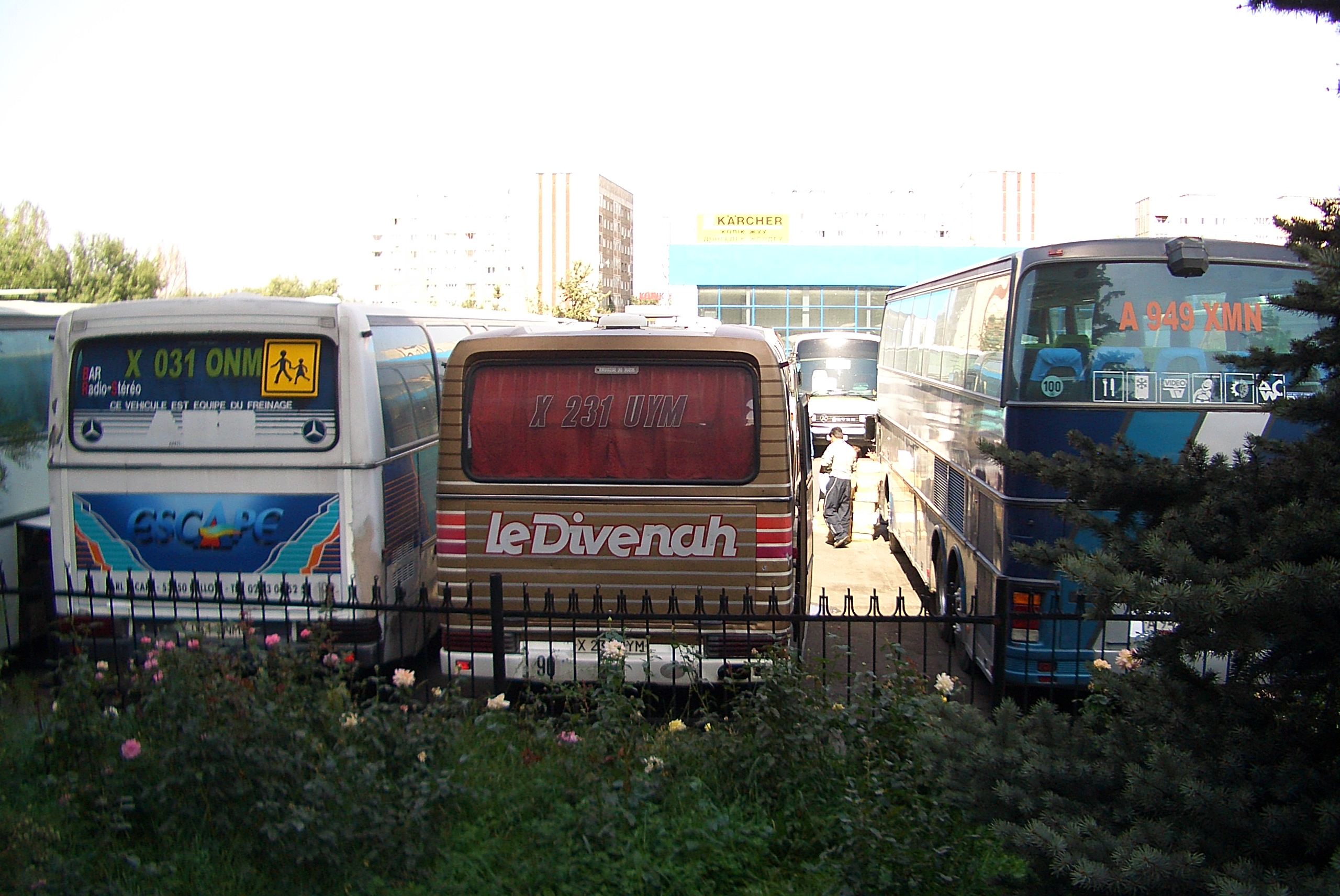
Buses parked at Sayran Bus Terminal

Sayran bus terminal (Kazakh: Сайран автобекеті, Sayran avtobeketı, Russian: автовокзал Сайран, tr. avtovokzal Sayran), also "New Bus Station" or "Central Bus Station", is a major long distance bus station in Almaty on the North West corner of the Sayran Reservoir. It is the opposite side of the lake from Sayran metro station on the South East corner of the lake.

== History ==
In 1978, the Minister of Road Transport of the Kazakh SSR, Anuar Zhakupov, instructed the Institute "KazNIPIAT" to develop a project of a new bus station in the city of Almaty. According to the feasibility study the city needed a very large bus station for 25 thousand passengers per day. The construction of the station was promoted by the fact that there were no electric trains in Almaty, and the entire out-of-town passenger traffic was carried by buses. The then existing Sayakhat bus station was no longer able to cope with the flow of passengers.

A group of designers with V.V. Nerovnya, V.D. Tyagovsky, O.E. Burgumbaev, and A.A. Bem developed pre-project materials (PPM). The ministry liked the layout and drawings of the future bus station, but the question arose with the necessary financing of construction, the estimated cost of which was 6 million rubles. At that time, the republic was responsible for construction projects worth up to 3 million rubles, and the construction of more expensive facilities required funding from the USSR State Planning Committee. The Minister of Motor Transport informed Kunayev Dinmuhamed, First Secretary of the Central Committee of the Communist Party of Kazakhstan, about his intention to build the bus terminal and asked for assistance in including the construction in the title list of the USSR Gosplan. Kunayev promised to help and instructed the chief architect of the city to find a convenient site.

The State Architecture Committee proposed the territory of two adjacent operating bus depots No. 6 and No. 7 located at the corner of Komsomolskaya Street and Mate Zalka Street, next to the artificial Sairan Lake. The architects and designers were given a large territory, where due to the natural slope of the relief they managed to organize two-level boarding of the buses. The new bus station was also intended to become the central object of the urban center, along with nearby buildings of "Soyuzdruk" and the district administration. The project of the new Almaty bus station successfully passed the state expertise of the Gosstroy of the USSR and with the assistance of D. Kunayev was included in the all-union title list of the Gosplan.

== Architecture ==
The building was erected in 1983 according to the project "KazNIIPIAT" (head of the creative group of the project Tyagovsky V. D., chief engineer Burgumbaev O. E., chief architect Nerovnya V. V., chief designer Bam A.A. and others). It consists of a central two-story and built three-story "storeys", the basic architectural image of the building gives a powerful, 9 meters high, the console overhang of the canopy on the perimeter of the roof. The central parts of the facade of the station is accentuated by a glazed stained-glass window. At the level of the second floor is a terrace. The total area of the station building is 12,410 m2, length 144 m. Waiting rooms are located on the first and second floors; the western part has a hotel, rest rooms for drivers, administrative offices, etc.; the eastern part has a dispatch service, an express buffet, a service bureau, a restaurant, a medical center, etc.; the basement has technical and special services and an automatic luggage storage for 1,700 people. For passenger convenience there are elevators, escalators, overhead pedestrian walkways to the bus platform. The halls were equipped with the most advanced electronic equipment at that time, ticket printing machines, furniture and equipment.

Marble, shell rock, Maikul granite and other materials were used in the decoration of the building. The southern facade of the station building faces the boarding platforms. From the waiting room of the bus station to them lead above-ground passages. The ceiling of the station is decorated with geometric elements of anodised aluminium and original lights with diffuser ribs. On the south side an open bus platform was organized for the organization of the reception and dispatch of buses, and on the north side a landscaped square was formed. In the landscaping of the area as much as possible complied with all the necessary environmental standards and norms of landscaping, tripled grass lawns, planted trees, poplar, elm, spruce and shrubs.

== Current status ==
Currently, the bus station has bus ticket offices, railway ticket offices, mother and child room, luggage department, hotel, cafe, railway ticket offices, sanitary infrastructure (showers, dry cleaning, laundry)

The premises of the station are rented by the owner, and numerous retail boutiques have been arranged on the outside under the station's terrace, as well as inside the building. The building of the bus station "Sairan" during the years of being in private ownership was practically not repaired and did not undergo maintenance, despite the numerous passenger turnover and the available profit received from the owners of buses and tenants using the station. In 2004 a 3-story building for the station administration was built by the station's owner on the territory of the bus station. The station area from the northern side adjacent to Tole Bi Street was largely built up, there was a gas station, a car wash, pavilions for the sale of food.

In 2018, despite the legal prohibition to interfere in the activities of private businesses, the akimat of the city demanded the demolition of all boutiques selling food products attached to the outside of the bus station, possibly due to an attempt to redirect customers and passengers to the large Magnum store located on the opposite side. At the same time, the akimat forcibly demolished at the expense of the budget public service facilities near the bus stop adjacent to Tolebi Street, the owner of which had all the documents of title.

In 2018, the Department of Architecture and Urban Planning of Almaty presented a reconstruction project for the bus station. On the territory of the bus station, transport logistics will be revised, the station square and the pedestrian zone will be expanded, the demolition of illegal buildings, including a car wash, is envisaged. Fountains, parking lots, green areas and playgrounds will be located on the adjacent territory. The main goal of a reconstruction project is to restore the original appearance of the station.

== Transport accessibility ==
There are numerous public transport routes: bus, trolleybus, streetcar (until October 2015) near the bus station, which can be used to get to the bus station from anywhere in the city.

== Demolition threat ==
In 2006, on the recommendation of foreign consultants, there was an idea to stop the operation of the Sairan bus terminal, which was actively lobbied by the then Akim of Almaty Imangali Tasmagambetov. According to him, the bus station should be located far outside the southern capital, referring that it would unload the city streets and improve the environment, allegedly the bus station "Sairan" pollutes the city, and a shopping center should appear in its place. Already by July 2007 the Sairan bus station was going to be closed, instead of which a new station "Ush Konyr" located outside the city, near the town of Kaskelen was going to be used. At the same time, the authorities did not specify how and by what the passengers from Almaty should get to the new "Ush Konyr" station and how the passengers arriving at this out-of-town station would get to Almaty.

In the same 2006 Akim's statements about the negative impact of the Sairan bus station on the environment were refuted. The Republican Scientific Production and Information Center "Kazecology" conducted an analysis of the environmental situation, in the course of which it was found out that "Sairan" "pollutes" the city by a negligible 0.1%. It also turned out that the buses with which Sairan bus station works, from the northern direction go only along Ryskulov Avenue, bypassing the city. It is an obligatory condition of work with carriers, prescribed in the scheme of the route. The southbound buses cover the city only 1.5 kilometers - from the ring on Saina-Raiymbek street to the bus station. They go mostly either early in the morning or late at night.

== Monument status ==
On March 19, 2019, Sayran bus station was granted monument status of architecture with inclusion in the State List of Historical and Cultural Monuments of Local Significance in Almaty.
