= Trams in Almaty =

Almaty tramway network
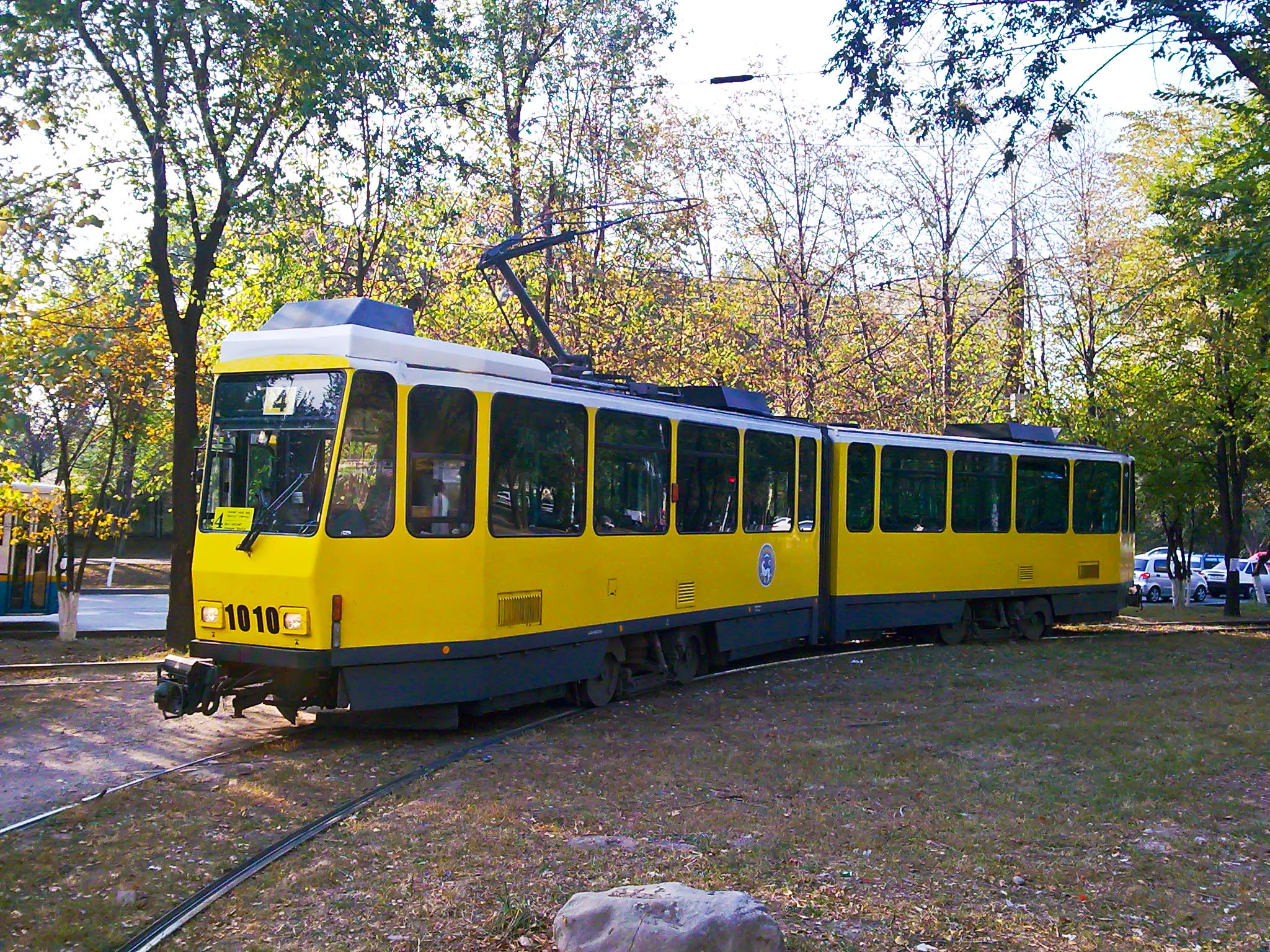
- Latest type of rolling stock on route 4

Operation
- Open: 1 December 1937
- Close: 31 October 2015
- Status: Suspended (indefinitely)
- Lines: 2 (10 previous to 2000)

Statistics
Overview

Almaty, the former capital of Kazakhstan, operated a modest tram network between 1937 and 2015. It was one of the four tramways of Kazakhstan which continuously operated from their opening dates. The network went into decline starting in the late 20th century, with most of its former routes closed by 2010. Operation of the remaining tram network was halted and indefinitely suspended on 31 October 2015.

== History ==
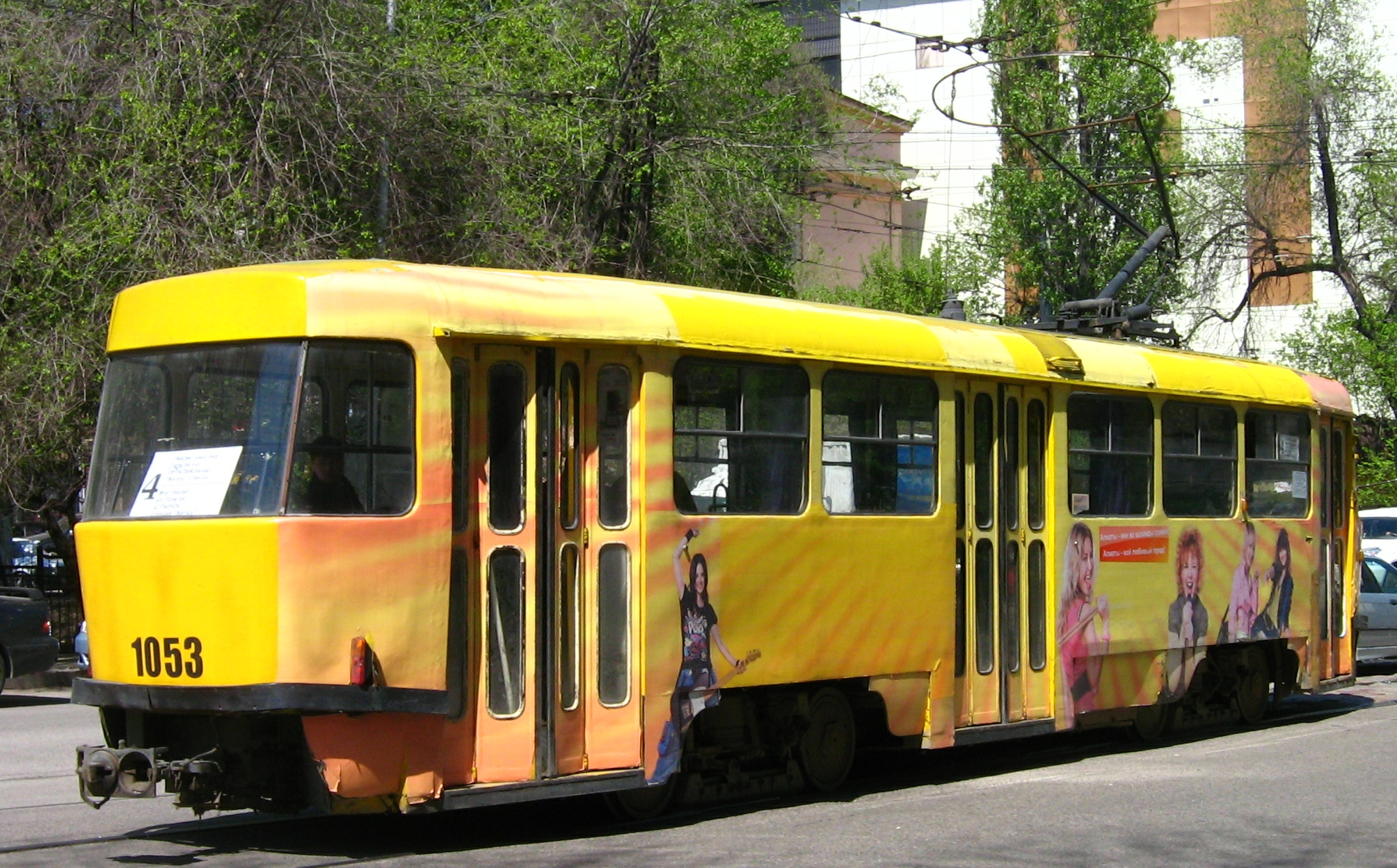
Almaty's older tramcars uses a mixture of panto-graph & bow collector

Like other Kazakh towns and cities, Almaty's tram system was also opened directly as an electric tram. It never ran horse or steam trams. Many changes of rolling stock occurred, and recently new modern low floor trams were introduced. The first tram ran here on 1 December 1937.

The electric tramway began operation in 1937 with four routes, which included one ring line. The tram network reached at peak ten routes in 1990. The decline of the network began in 2000, when 8 routes were phased out through 2010. Operation on the final two tram routes was indefinitely suspended on 31 October 2015 due to accidents, required network maintenance, and the unprofitability of the tramway.

== Tram routes ==
Previous to 1991, there had been 10 tram routes in operation. But like many Asian cities, most of the routes were closed between 1991 and 2010. Before the indefinite suspension of service in October 2015, there were two remaining operational tram routes:

- 4 – Zhetysuyskaya–Aksay
- 6 – Zhetysuyskaya–Orbita

== Fleet ==
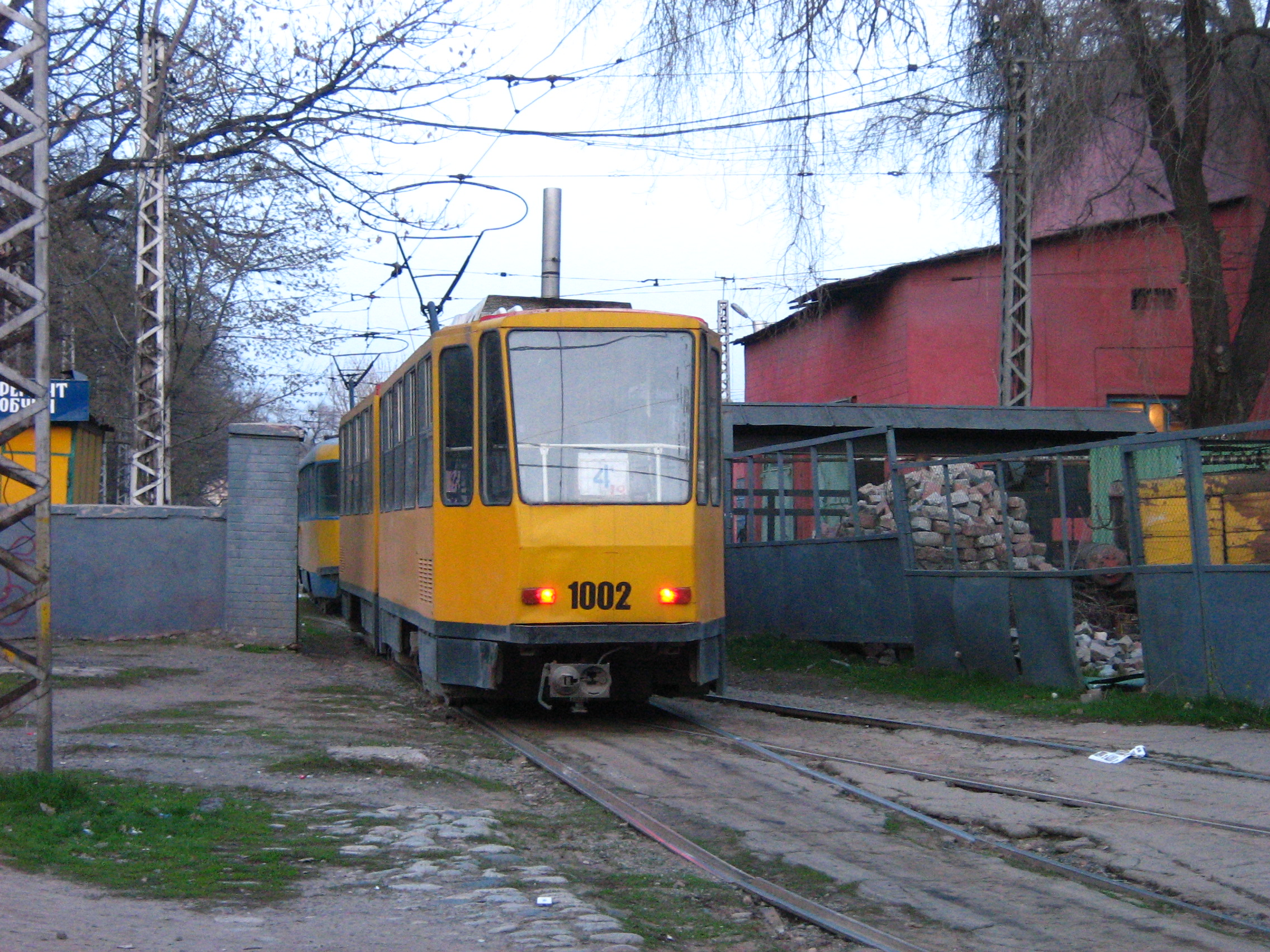
Tatra KT4 tram is exiting from depot

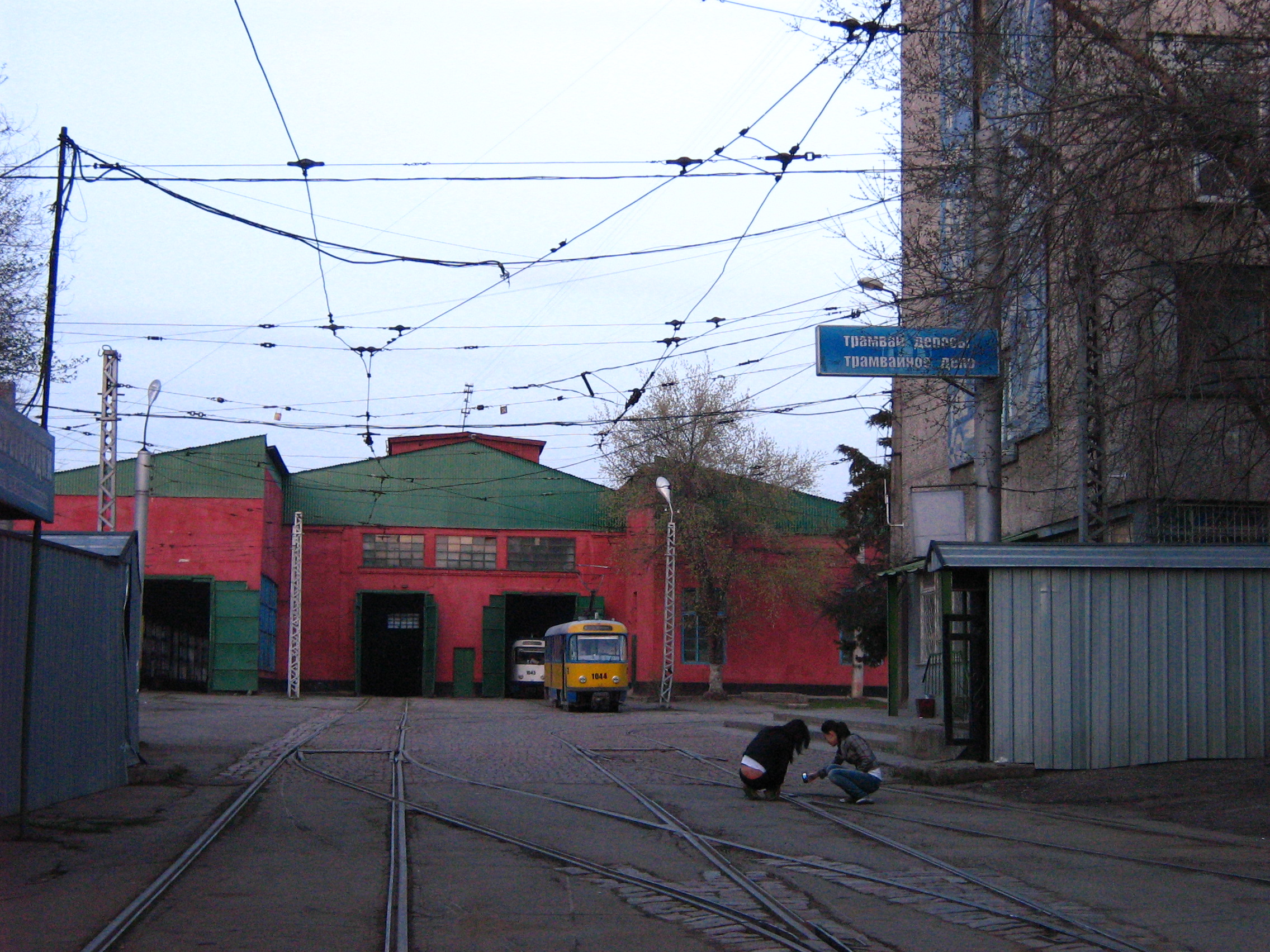
Almaty main tram depot

Most tramcars were Tatra models. These were KT4Ds from Berlin and T4Ds from other German cities. Older models used a bow collector, but newer models used a pantograph. While the city of Almaty earlier reported having 28 trams, by the time of the network's closure in 2015 there were only 12 remaining trams (of which only 7 were operational).

== Character of network ==
Both of Almaty's remaining tram lines ran on unreserved tracks and middle of the roads with automobiles.

== Passenger numbers ==
In 2003 the system carried 19.7 million passengers. This number fell to 12.9 million in 2006, 4 million in 2009, to just 1.3 million in 2013. It briefly increased afterwards and in 2015 the number was 4 million. The passenger turnover per kilometer also dramatically dropped and was just 1/10th the value in 2013 than it was in 2003.

== Criticism ==
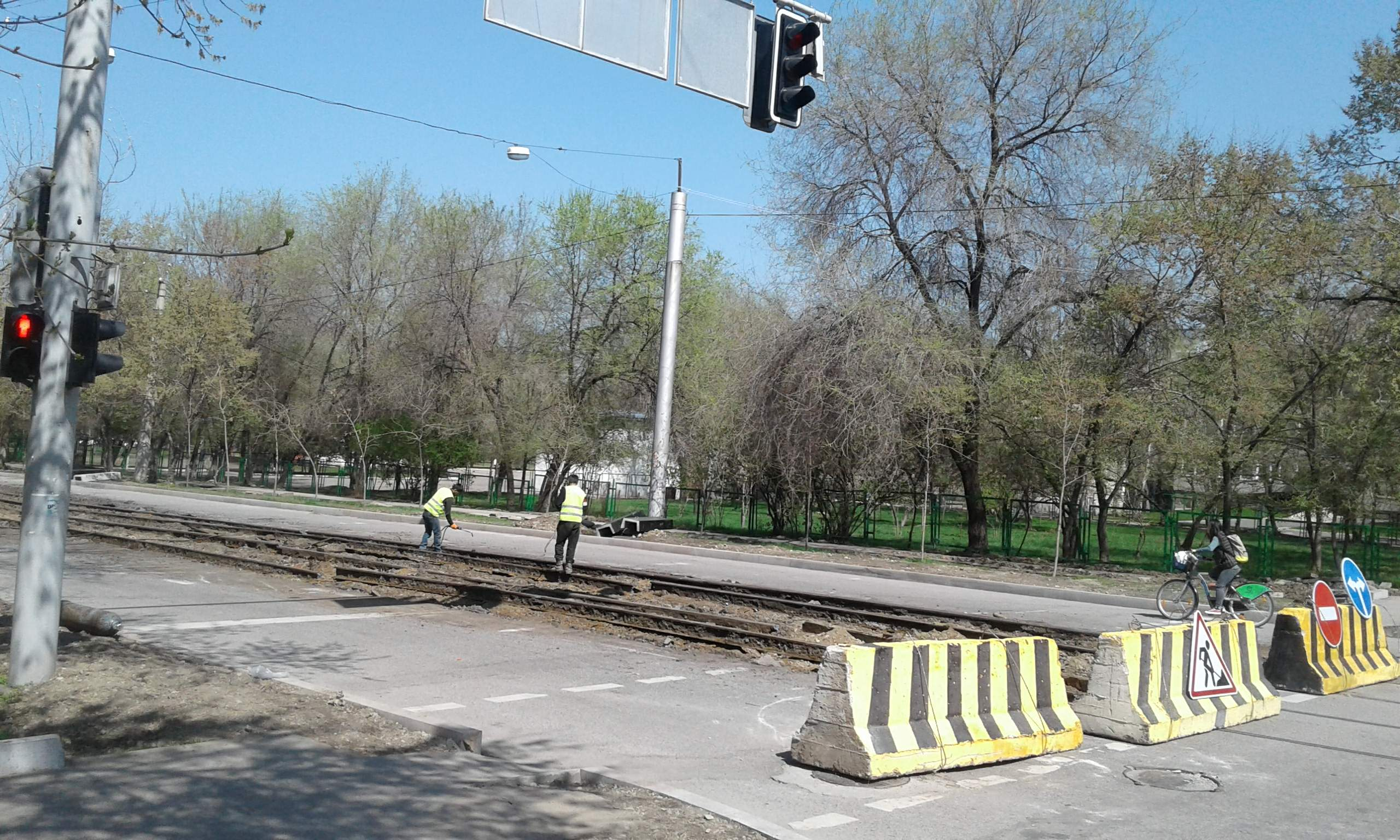
Tram tracks being dismantled in Zharokova Street (2018)

Before the indefinite suspension of service, trams in Almaty were no longer an important means of transport within the city. Most tram routes had been closed during 1991 to 2010 due to construction and opening of metro network, though Line 1 of the metro opened only in 2011. However, the two tram routes that had remained in operation had gotten new fresh rolling stocks for a speedier service in 2013. For that reason there was much criticism from the public for suspending the service entirely after the recent purchase of new stock.

== See also ==
- Almaty Metro
- Almaty Light Rail
- Trolleybuses in Almaty

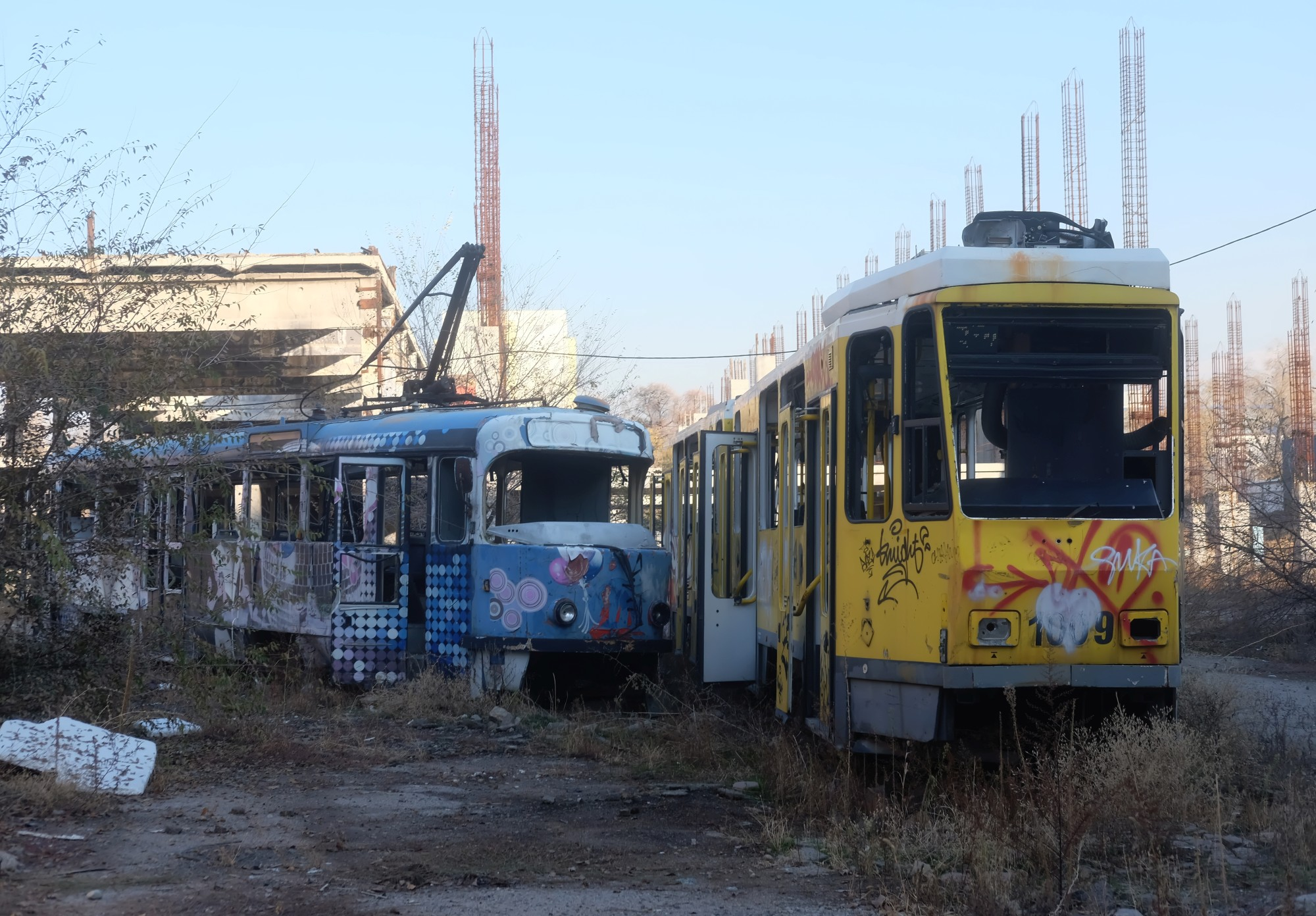
Abandoned trams in the abandoned depot on Baytursynova street, fall 2022
