= Sayran Lake =

- Сайран (Kazakh)
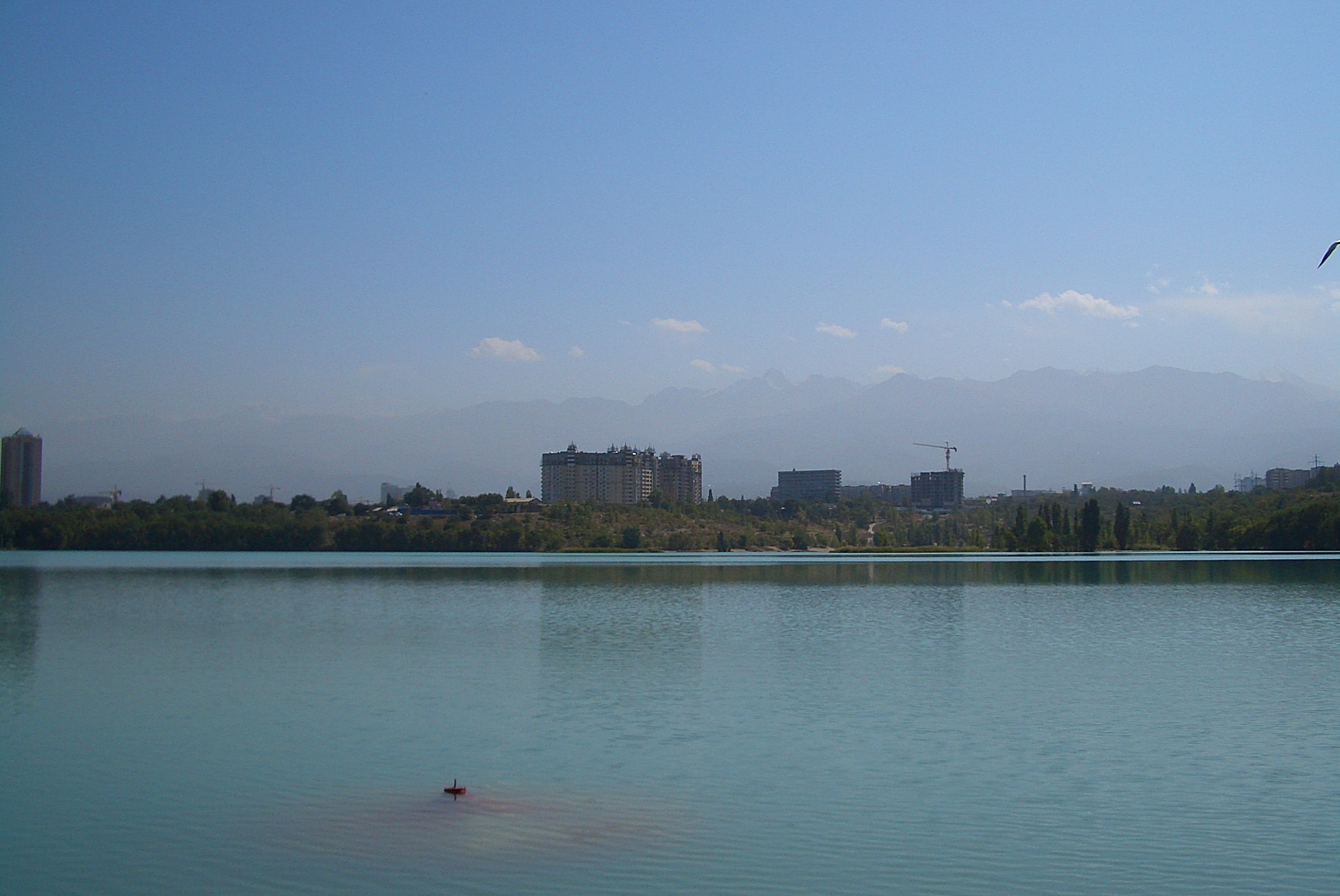
- Sayran

- Location within Kazakhstan
- Location: Almaty, Kazakhstan
- Coordinates: 43.244°N 76.864°E
- Type: man-made lake
- Average depth: 12.1 metres (40 ft)
- Max. depth: 18 metres (59 ft)
- Water volume: 2,300,000 cubic metres (81,000,000 cu ft)

Sayran (Kazakh: Сайран, Saıran) is a man-made lake and reservoir in Almaty, Kazakhstan. During a 2011 summary meeting mayor of Almaty Akhmetzhan Yessimov announced that an oceanarium may be constructed at the lake.

On the northwest corner of the lake is the Sayran bus station, while on the southeast corner is the Sayran metro station.
