= Bauyrjan Momyshuly (Almaty Metro) =

Metro station in Almaty, Kazakhstan

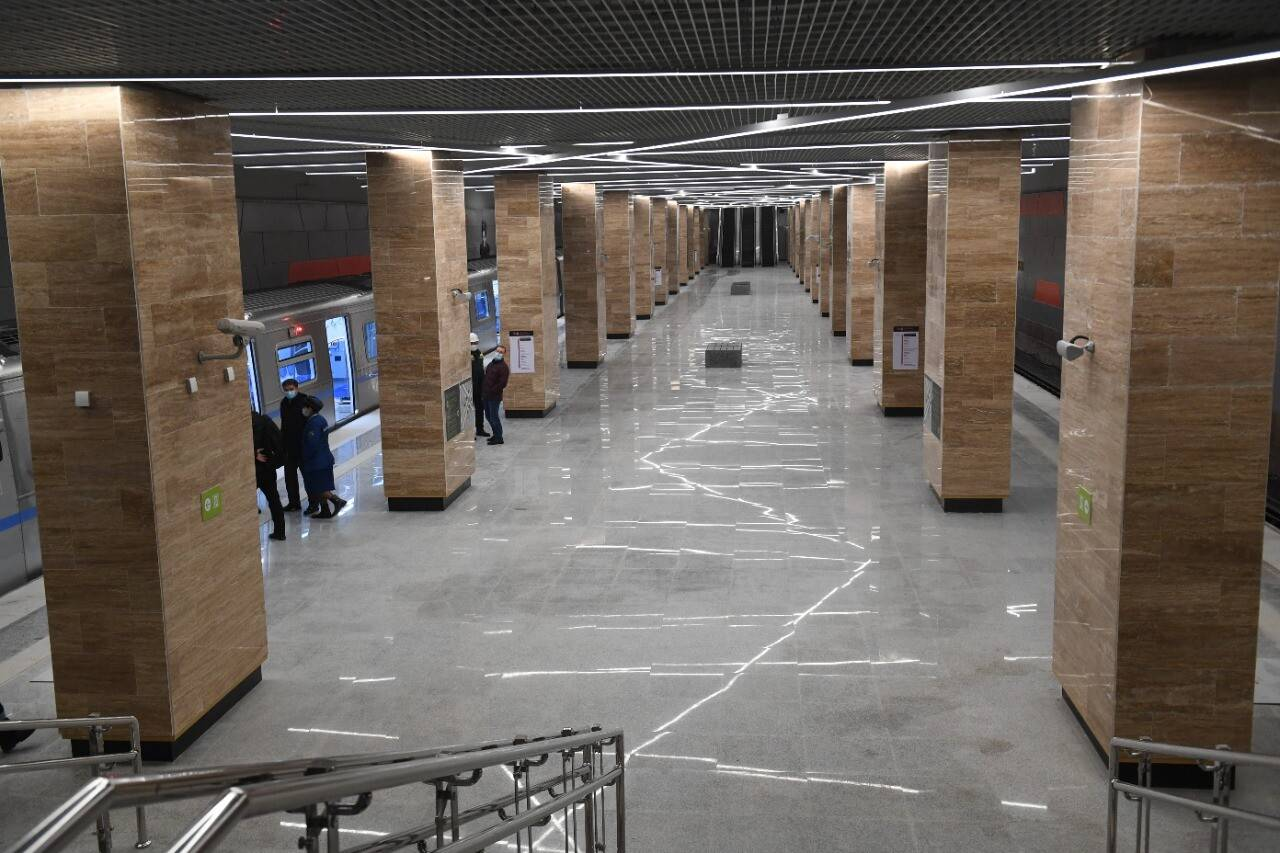

General information
- Coordinates: 43.2164°N 76.8379°E
- System: Almaty Metro rapid transit station
- Owner: Almaty Metro
- Line: Line 1
- Platforms: 1

Construction
- Depth: 11 m (36 ft)

Other information
- Status: Open

History
- Opening: 30 May 2022

Services
Preceding station	Almaty Metro	Following station
Saryarqa towards Raiymbek batyr	First Line	Terminus
Location

Bauyrjan Momyshuly (Kazakh: Бауыржан Момышұлы) is a Line 1 station of Almaty Metro that opened to the public in May 2022. It was originally planned to be opened in 2018. The station is located near the intersection of Abay Avenue and Momyshuly Street.

The station is named after Bauyrzhan Momyshuly.
