= Line 1 (Almaty Metro) =

Metro station in Almaty, Kazakhstan

First Line

Overview
- Locale: Almaty
- Termini: Raiymbek batyr (northeast); Bauyrzhan Momyshuly (southwest)
- Stations: 11

Service
- Type: Rapid transit
- System: Almaty Metro
- Operator(s): Communal State Enterprise "Metropolyten"

History
- Opened: 1 December 2011

Technical
- Line length: 13.40 kilometres (8.33 mi)
- Track gauge: 1,520 mm (4 ft 11 27/32 in)

The First Line (Kazakh: Бірінші бағыт, Bırınşı bağyt; Russian: Первая линия) is the first line opened of the Almaty Metro in Almaty, Kazakhstan. The first stretch with seven stations, between Raiymbek batyr and Alatau, and with a train yard at the Raiymbek batyr, was opened on 1 December 2011. The first extension with two stations, between Alatau and Moskva, was opened on 18 April 2015. The second extension with two stations, between Moskva and Bauyrzhan Momyshuly, was opened on 30 May 2022.
