= Raiymbek batyr (Almaty Metro) =

Almaty Metro Station

Coordinates: 43°16′13″N 76°56′41″E

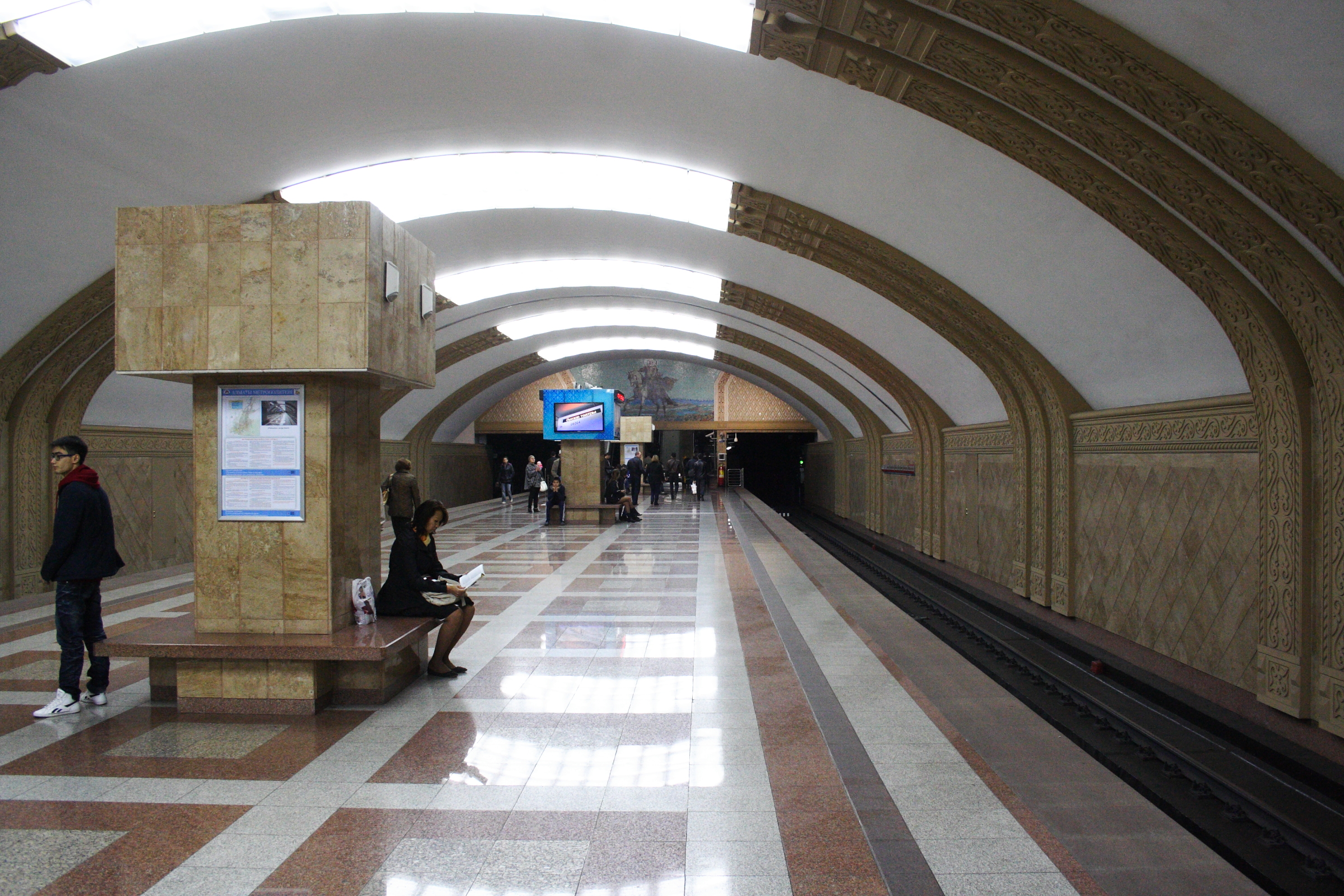

General information
- Owner: Almaty Metro
- Line: Line 1
- Platforms: 1
- Tracks: 2

Construction
- Depth: 9m

History
- Opened: 1 December 2011

Services
Preceding station	Almaty Metro	Following station
Terminus	First Line	Zhibek Joly towards Bauyrjan Momyshuly
Location

Raiymbek batyr (Kazakh: Райымбек батыр, Raiymbek batyr) is a station of Line 1 of the Almaty Metro. The station was opened on December 1, 2011.
