= Almaty Metro =

Rapid transit system in Almaty, Kazakhstan

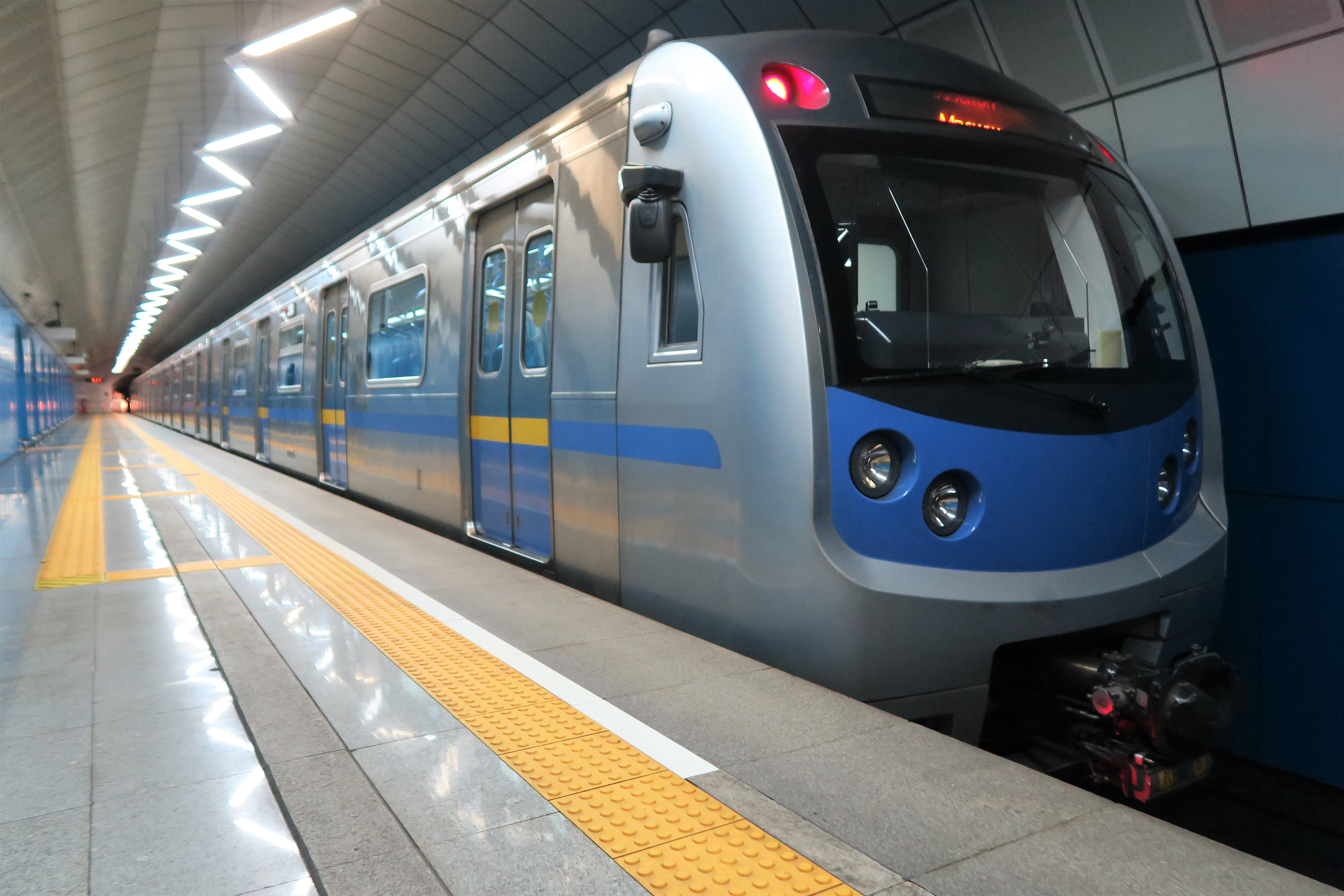
- A train at Baikonur in September 2016

Overview
- Native name: Алматы метрополитені Almaty Metropolitenı
- Locale: Almaty, Kazakhstan
- Transit type: Rapid transit
- Number of lines: 1
- Number of stations: 11
- Daily ridership: 80,000 on weekdays and 60,000 weekends (average, Autumn 2022)
- Annual ridership: 27 million (2024)
- Website: KGP Metro Almaty

Operation
- Began operation: 1 December 2011; 14 years ago
- Operator: Communal State Enterprise "Metropolyten"
- Number of vehicles: 15

Technical
- System length: 13.4 km (8.3 mi)
- Track gauge: 1,520 mm (4 ft 11 27/32 in) Russian gauge
- Electrification: 750 V DC
- Average speed: 34 km/h (21 mph)
- Top speed: 90 km/h (56 mph)
System map

Almaty Metro (Kazakh: Алматы метрополитені, Almaty Metropolitenı; Russian: Алматинский метрополитен) is a rapid transit/metro system in Almaty, the largest city and a former capital of Kazakhstan. The first line of the system was opened on 1 December 2011, after more than 23 years of construction. A 2.9-kilometre (1.8 mi), two-station extension of the Metro to Moskva station opened on 18 April 2015, followed by a 3.1 kilometres (1.9 mi), two-station extension to Bauyrzhan Momyshuly on 30 May 2022. Until Astana Light Metro opened on 16 May 2026, this was the only metro system in Kazakhstan.

== History ==
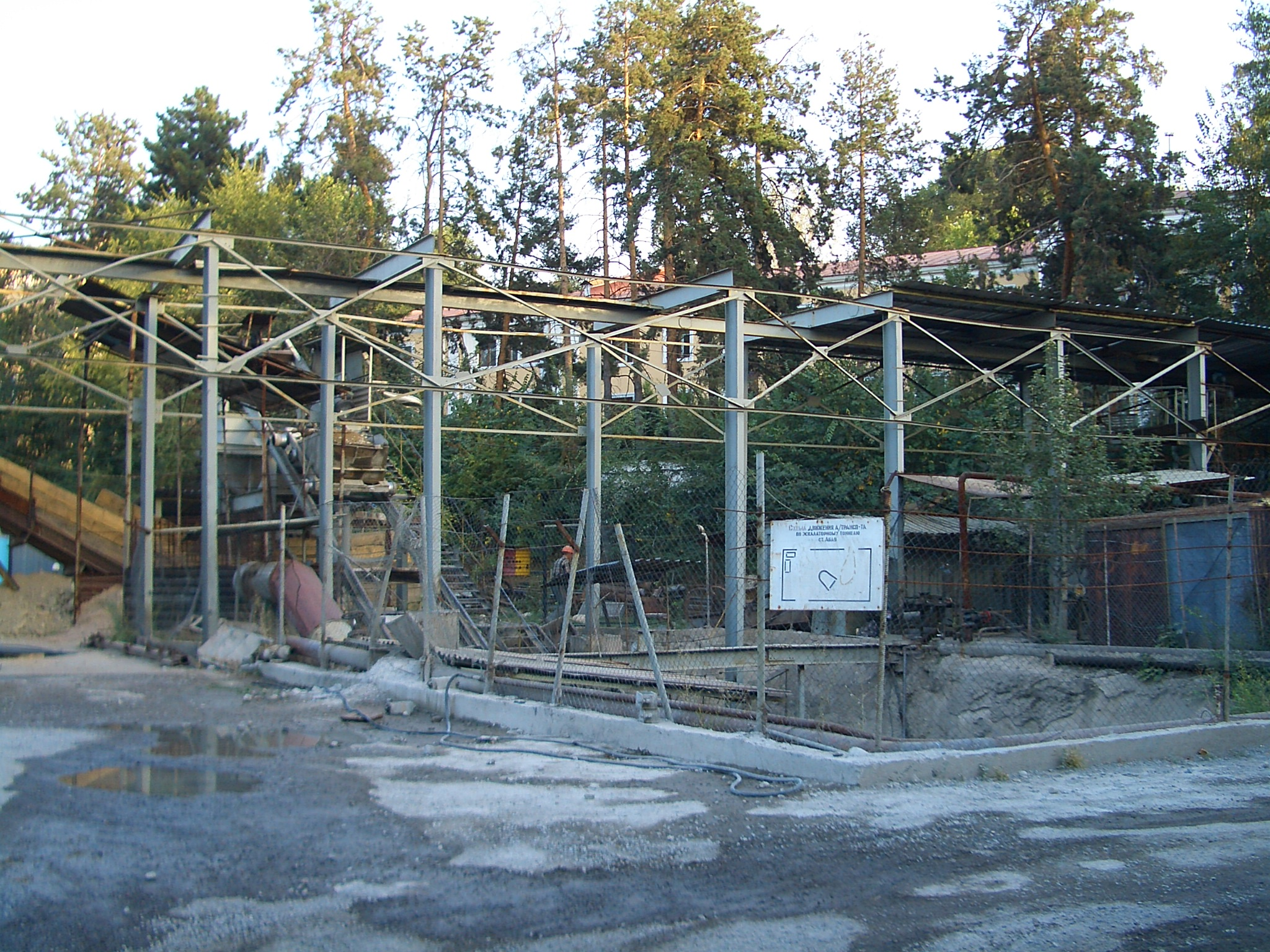
Construction of Abay Station, September 2007

Construction of the Almaty Metro began on 7 September 1988 when Kazakhstan was part of the Soviet Union. However, following the collapse of the Soviet Union, funds from Moscow dried up and the new Kazakhstan government was unable to continue construction. Efforts to preserve the already-completed work were made, but the high cost led to the accumulation of large debts to construction workers.

In 2003, the government of Kazakhstan laid out a new development initiative which included government funds for continued construction on the metro. During the Metro's construction the Almaty tram network was wound down and most of its routes closed by 2010.

In 2019, work at two metro stations, Dostyk and Saryarka, was suspended due to corruption charges against SK Engineering Support LLP, which owns 80% of the shares of Almatymetrokurylys JSC, and a criminal case was initiated.

=== Construction ===
By 2005, the construction programme, now under the control of President Nursultan Nazarbayev, received commitments for 72 million tenge for 2006–2008.

In 2007, the tunnel between the Almaly and Abai stations was completed on the night of 24/25 May. The tunnel is 1.271 kilometres (0.790 mi) in length. At the connection point, it is situated at a depth of 73 metres (239 ft 6 in). The tunnel from Abai towards Baikonur (1.526 kilometres (0.948 mi) in length) was finished at the end of 2007. Another tunnel on this span was finished in the middle of 2008.

The construction cost on the first line is estimated at 101 billion tenge (US$1 billion).

The first section of the Metro opened 1 December 2011, operating on 8.54 kilometres (5.3 mi) of route and serving seven stations (four deep-level stations and three sub-surface stations). When opened, it was the second metro system in Central Asia and the sixteenth metro in the former Soviet Union region.

Construction on the expansion to Sairan and Moskva stations started in 2011, and opened for service on 18 April 2015, adding another 2.9 kilometres (1.8 mi) of route and two stations to the Metro. The next extension was completed on 30 May 2022 with an additional 3.1 kilometres (1.9 mi) two stations, Sary-Arka and Bauyrzhan Momyshuly.

=== Architecture ===
When designing the stations, the best traditions of architectural design, set by Soviet architects, were continued. Each station is unique and combines high aesthetics, historicism, and national artistic motives. Each station is decorated with a thematic panel that tells about the cultural and historical heritage. When decorating the walls and floors, natural facing granite stones from the Kurdai, Kurta, and Kapal-Arasan deposits of Kazakhstan were used.

== Operations ==
The metro operating hours are daily, from 6:20 to 0:00 (UTC+5). Until 4 January 2012, the metro worked from 6:00 to 0:00 (UTC + 5).

The first stage of the first line has an operating length of 10.3 kilometres (6.4 mi) (construction — 11.3 kilometres (7.0 mi)) and consists of 9 stations (5 of which are deep, the remaining four are shallow). It runs from Rayymbek Ave. in a southerly direction under Nazarbayev Ave. (former Furmanov St.) to Abai Ave, and further along it in a westerly direction to Altynsarin Ave. The line runs seven four-car trains. The traffic interval is 13 minutes on weekends, and 10 minutes on weekdays during inter-peak hours, during peak hours it is reduced to 8 minutes. The average speed is about 40 kilometres per hour (25 mph). The travel time for the first stage of the first line is approximately 16 minutes. The rolling stock is modern trains manufactured by the South Korean concern Hyundai with a through passage, air conditioning in the carriages, full autopilot mode and other features.

As of April 2015, the Almaty Metro had a route length of 11.3 kilometres (7.0 mi) and served nine stations. The Metro expanded with an additional 3.1 kilometres (1.9 mi) extension to Sary-Arka and Baurzhan Momyshuly and was completed in May 2022. The route length increased to 13.4 kilometres (8.3 mi).

The Almaty Metro owns fifteen four-car trainsets made by Hyundai Rotem. Because of this, they have many similarities to metro trains in South Korea, as well as the Canada Line units in Vancouver, Canada. It is one of only two metros in the former Soviet Union to have never used the 81/717-714, the other being Kazan (although a derivative model is used in that case), one of only two to use trains not built by a Russian company, the other being Minsk, using trains built by the Swiss company Stadler (in the future, Kharkiv will also have this title), and the only to have never used trains built by such companies. The reason for building differently was because their needs did not line up with what Metrowagonmash was offering at the time.

=== Fare ===
The fare is paid using contactless reusable smart cards and disposable smart tokens. The cost of one trip is 120 tenge as of 2024. Children from 7–15 years old can opt for reduced tariffs upon presentation of a birth certificate. The cost of a smart card without a balance is 100 tenge. The balance of smart cards can be replenished through cash desks and automated terminals at the stations. The validity of the card is 3 years. The token is valid until the end of the current day. Wednesday is declared "token day". On this day, passengers can bring their expired tokens and use them.

In addition to the above types of payment, since 2016, payment in the metro has also been made by the ONAI card system and contactless payment cards, for which separate turnstiles have been installed.

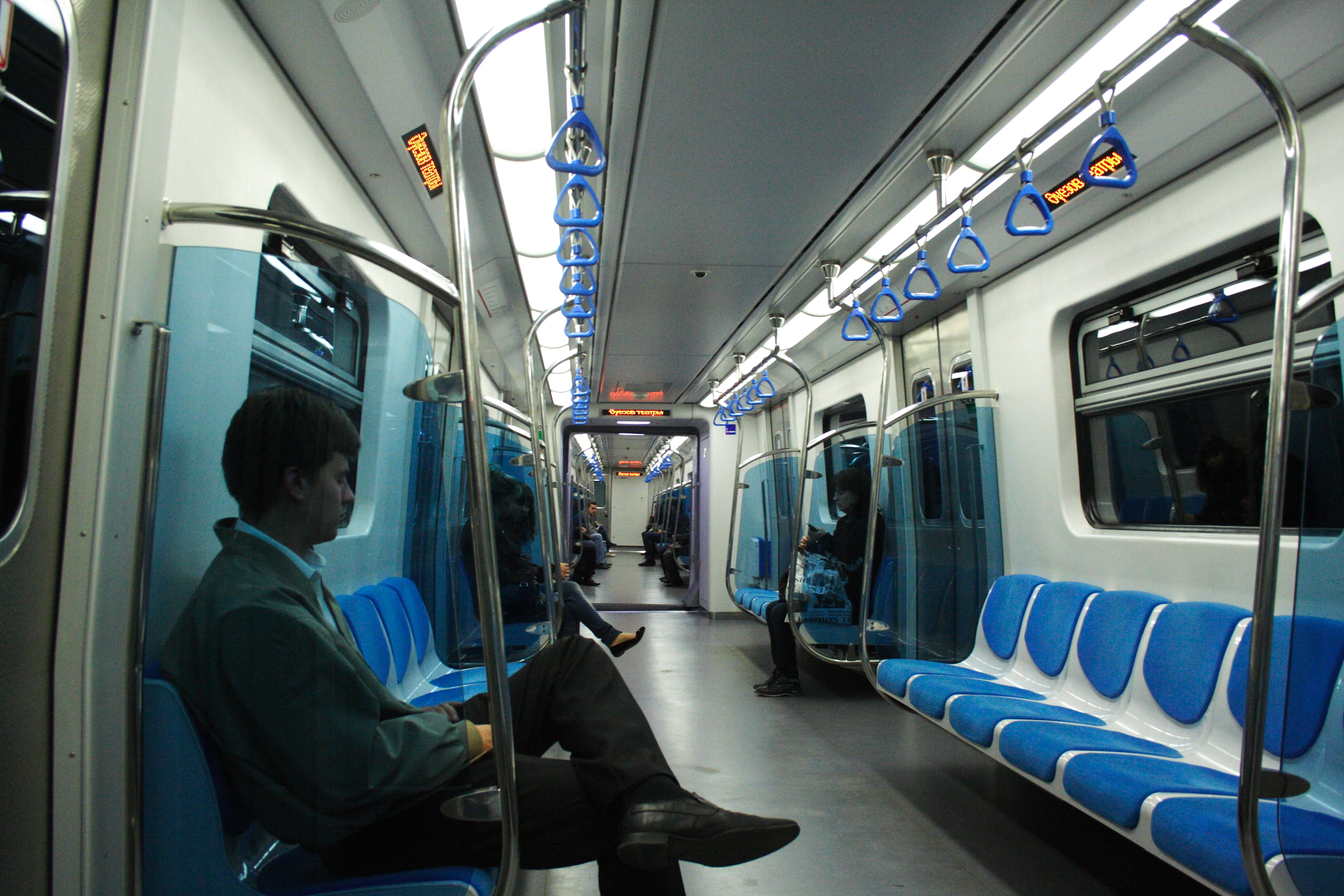
Inside a metro train

== Passenger numbers ==
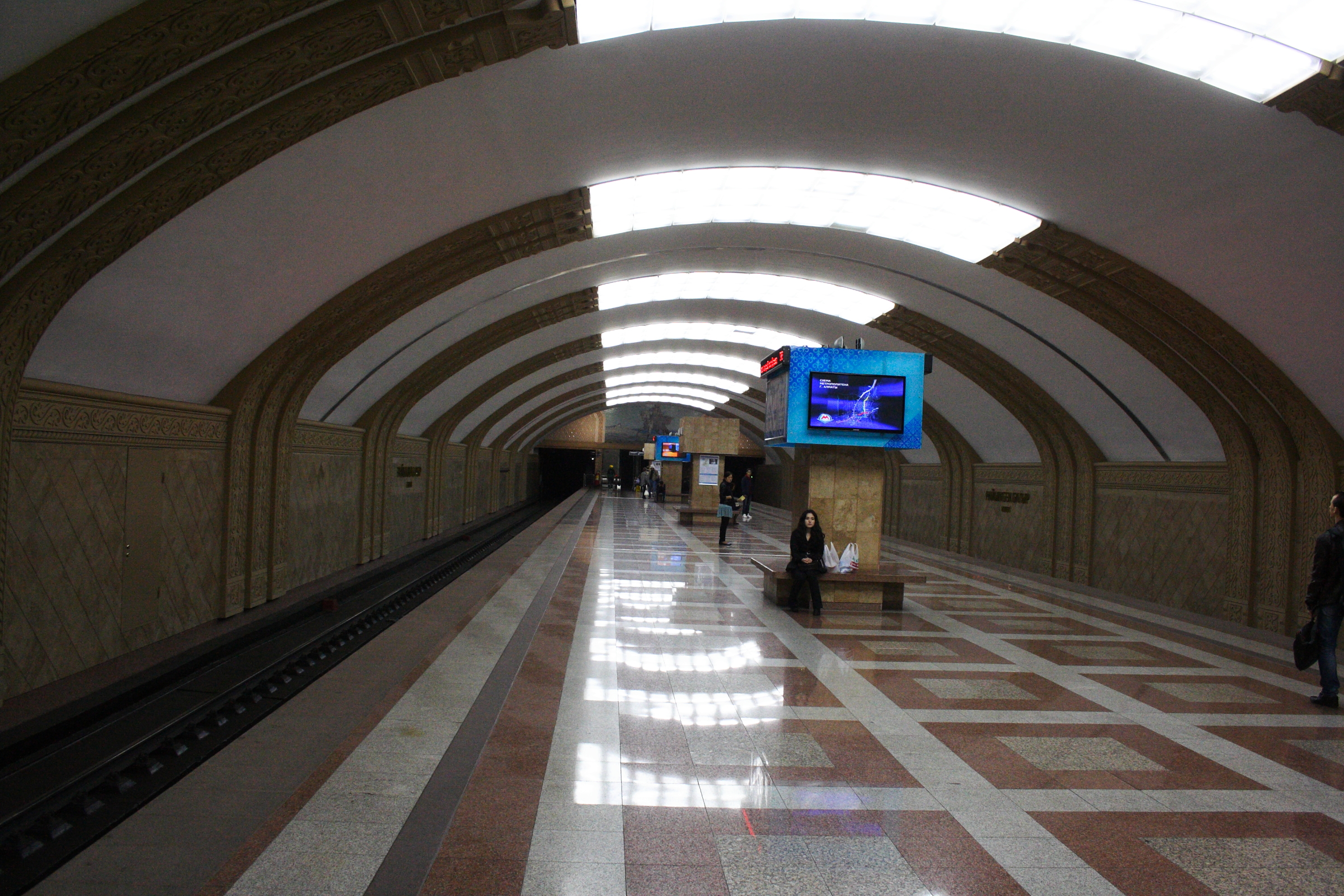
Platforms of Raiymbek batyr Metro station

12.4 million passengers used the metro in 2016, an increase on the 10.6 million who used it in 2015. Daily passenger numbers varied from 17,000 per day on Saturdays, Sundays and public holidays to up to 45,000 people who used it on working days.

After opening of Saryarqa and Momyshuly stations in May 2022, daily ridership increased to 80 thousand passengers on weekdays and up to 60 thousand - on weekends.

== Future plans ==
The 5.52 kilometres (3.43 mi) extension to Kalkaman and Western Bus Station is predicted for completion in 2025. Phase 3 will start after the completion of Phase 2 and will consist of a northern extension of 8.76 kilometres (5.44 mi), predicted for completion before 2035.

== Incidents ==
=== Death of a worker - February 2006 ===
In February 2006, a worker died during the construction of the subway. At about 9 a.m., worker Ali Sulekbayev fell under the wheels of a KAMAZ. The 22-year-old Sulekbayev was an employee of AlmatyMetroKurylys JSC. The KAMAZ was not registered with the traffic police.

=== Ground collapse on 9 August 2008 ===
On 9 August 2008, around 5 p.m., there was a collapse of soil from the surface into the tunnel of the subway under construction at the intersection of Abay Avenue and Gagarin Street. From the nearby construction excavation soon arrived subway builders and KamAZ trucks, loaded with earth, began to fill in the landslide.

On 12 August, the head of Almatymetrokurylys JSC Murat Ukshebaev did not meet with journalists. According to some reports, the supports were installed at a distance of 20 meters instead of the projected 4 meters.

On 16 August, the directorate of Almatymetrokurylys JSC announced the official conclusions of the commission: "The soils of the area are represented by the soil-vegetation layer, bulk soils, loam and pebbles. The green stripe separating Gagarin Ave in summer time is systematically irrigated through aryk system. Water, draining, gradually washed the ground. When the humidity of the soil reached a critical point, under its own weight the soil collapsed".

According to Salamat Esimkhanov, Deputy Chief Engineer of the Almaty Metro Construction Directorate: "Soil wetting cannot be the cause of the collapse. The designers studied all the risks. They had all the information about this area, they couldn't have been unaware that water was flowing or there were any communications there.

The head of JSC Almatymetrokurylys, Murat Ukshebaev, refused to comment.

== Construction gallery ==
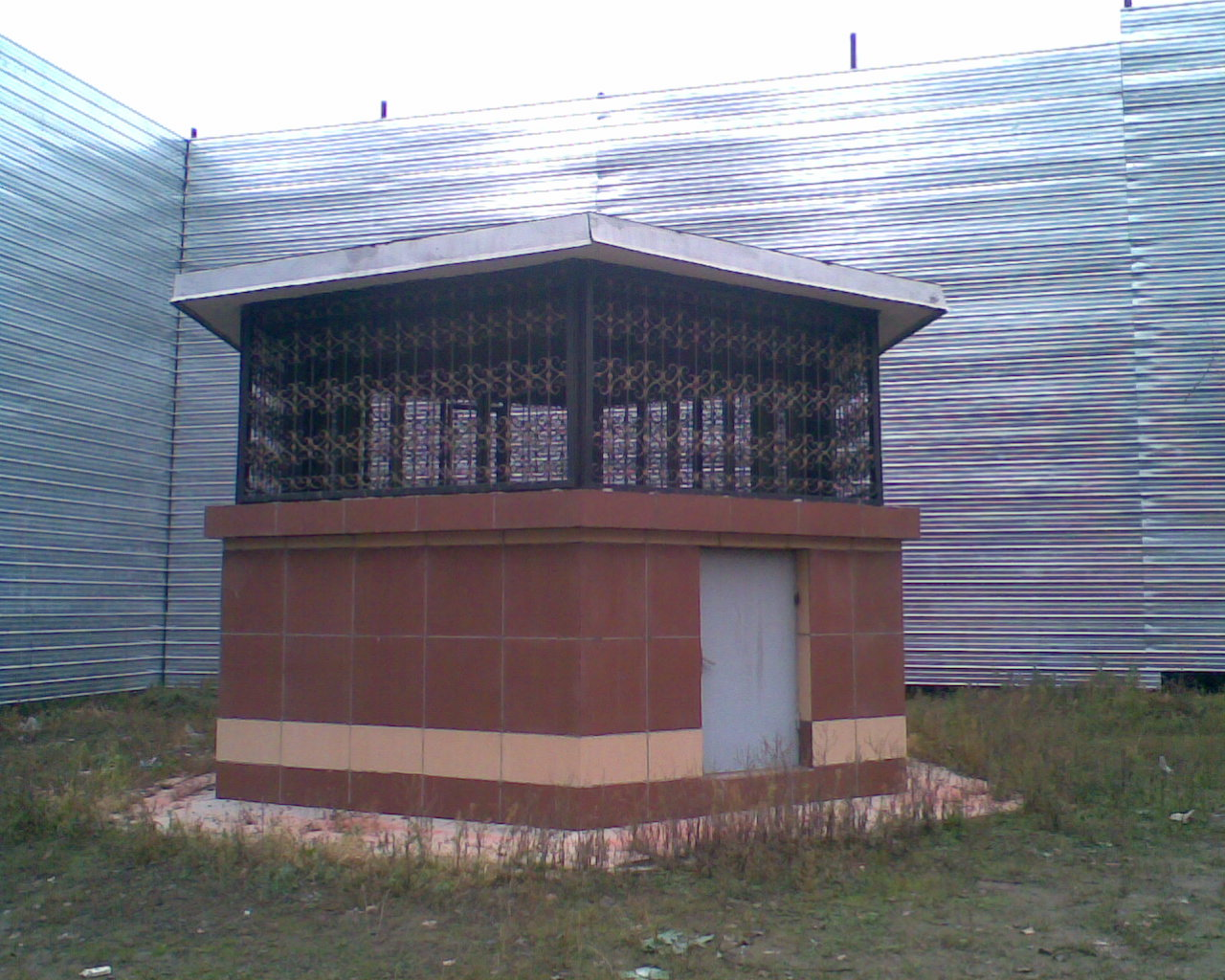
Ventoire at the intersection of Furmanov and Mametova Streets between "Zhibek Zholy" and "Raimbeka" stations (October 2008)

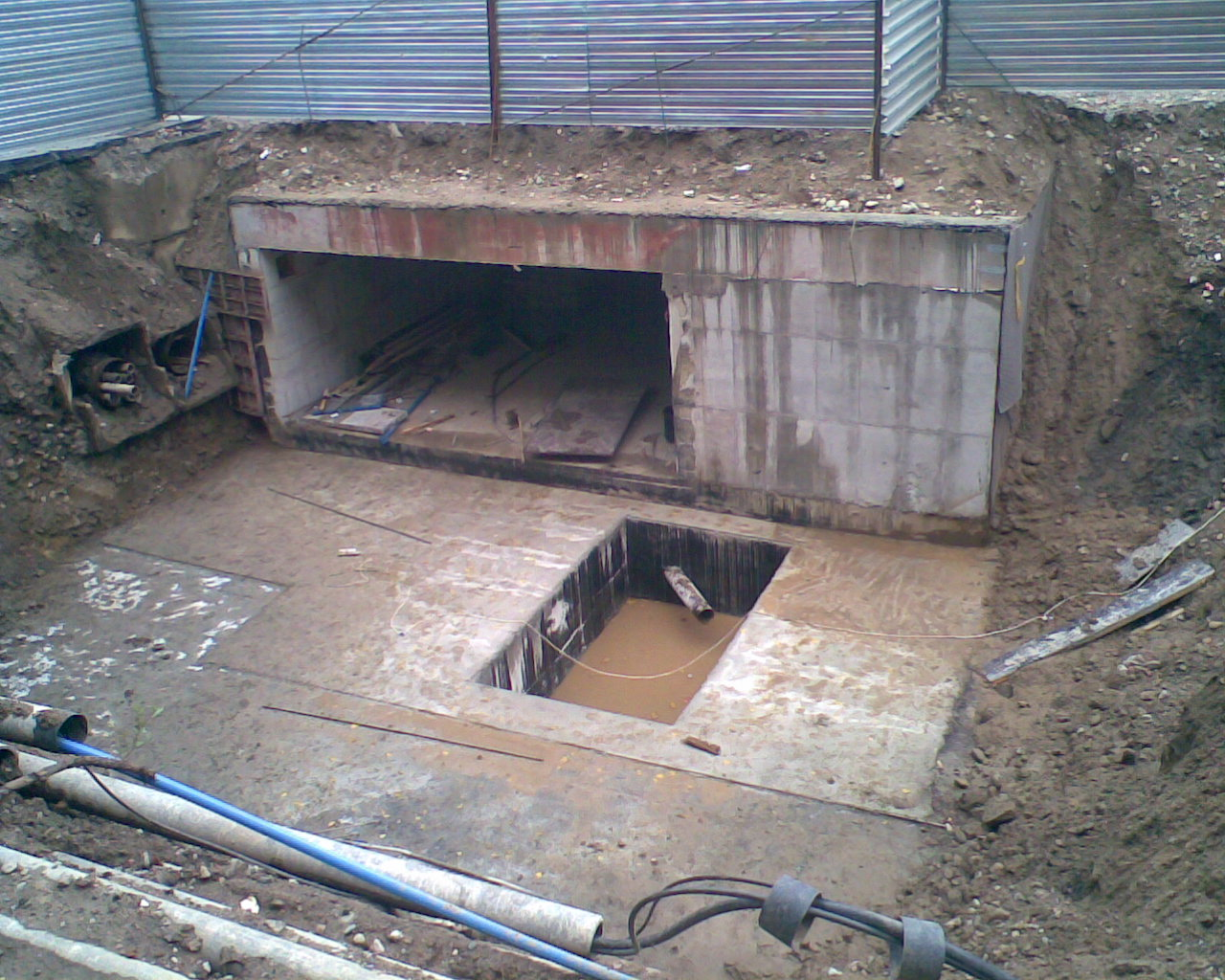
Construction of crossings under Furmanov Street and Raimbek Avenue near Raimbek station (October 2008)

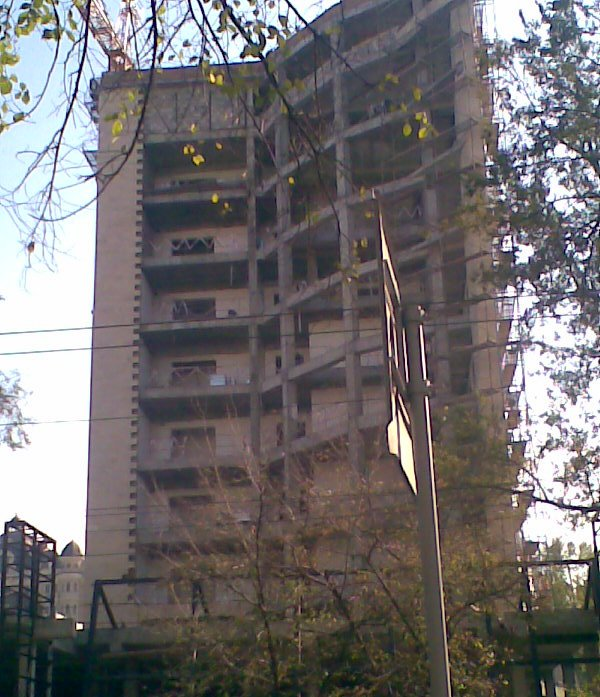
Engineering building (view from Gogol Street) above Zhibek Zholy station (October 2008)

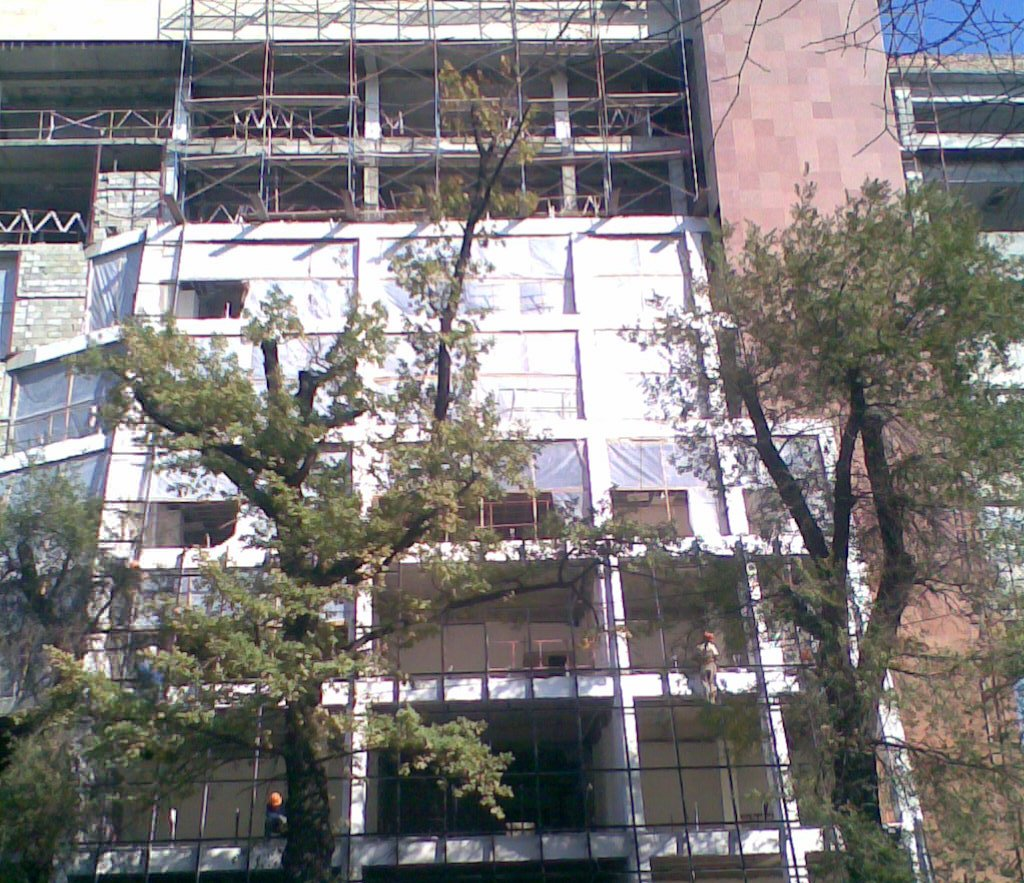
Engineering building (front view of Panfilov Street) above "Zhibek Zholy" station (October 2008)

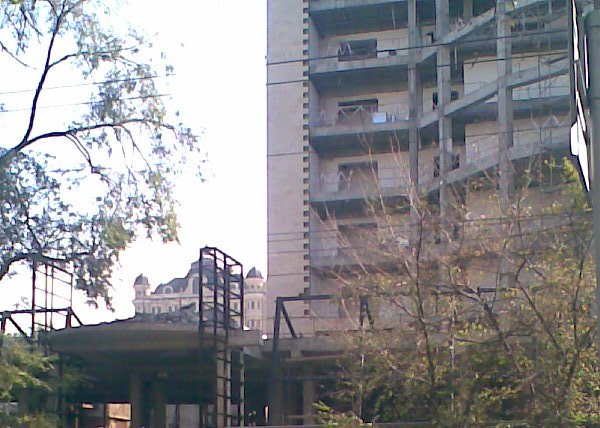
Engineering building (front view of Panfilov Street) above Zhibek Zholy station (October 2008)

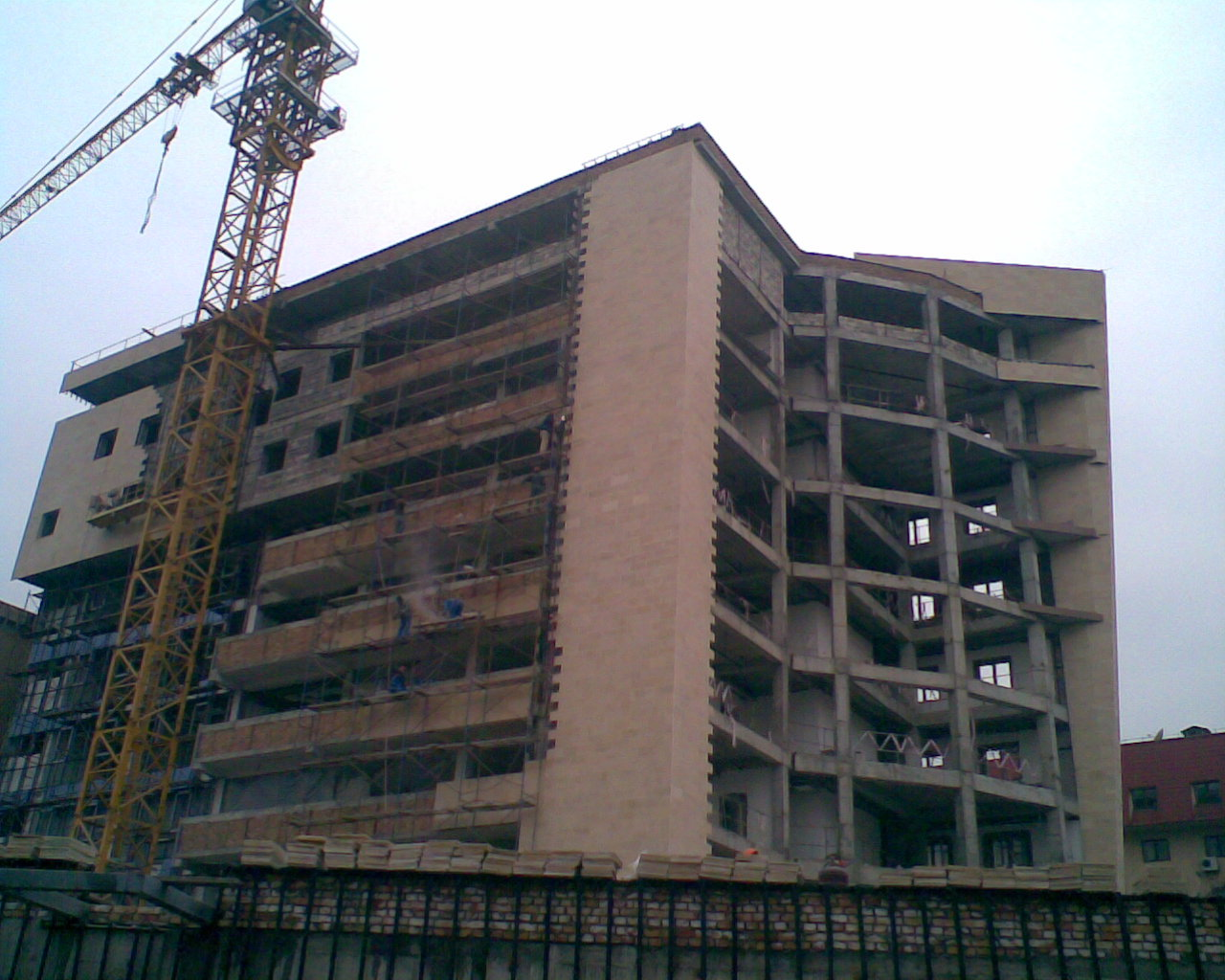
Engineering building (view behind Gogol Street) above Zhibek Zholy station (November 2008)

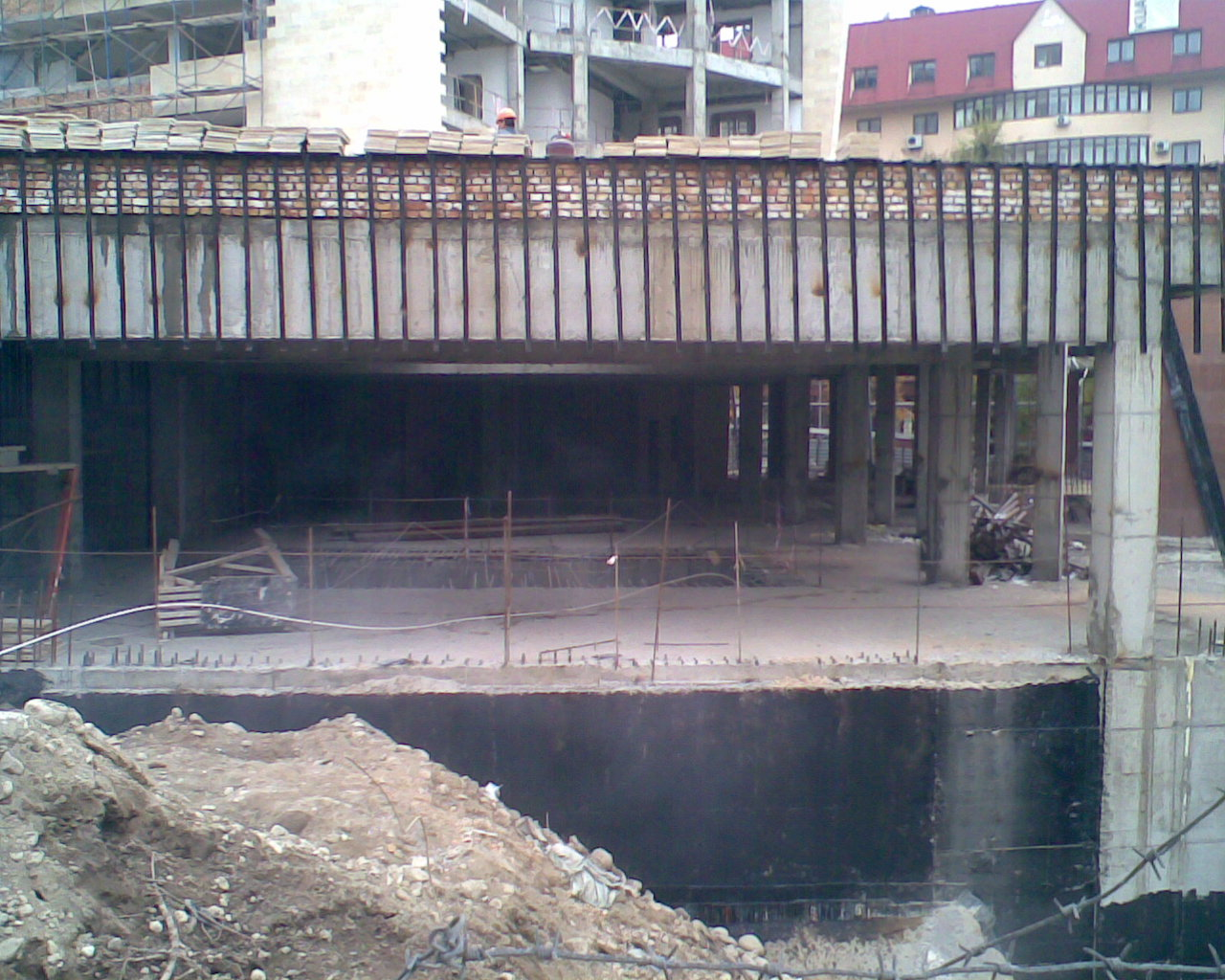
The concourse under construction (view from behind Gogol Street) above Zhibek Zholy station (November 2008)

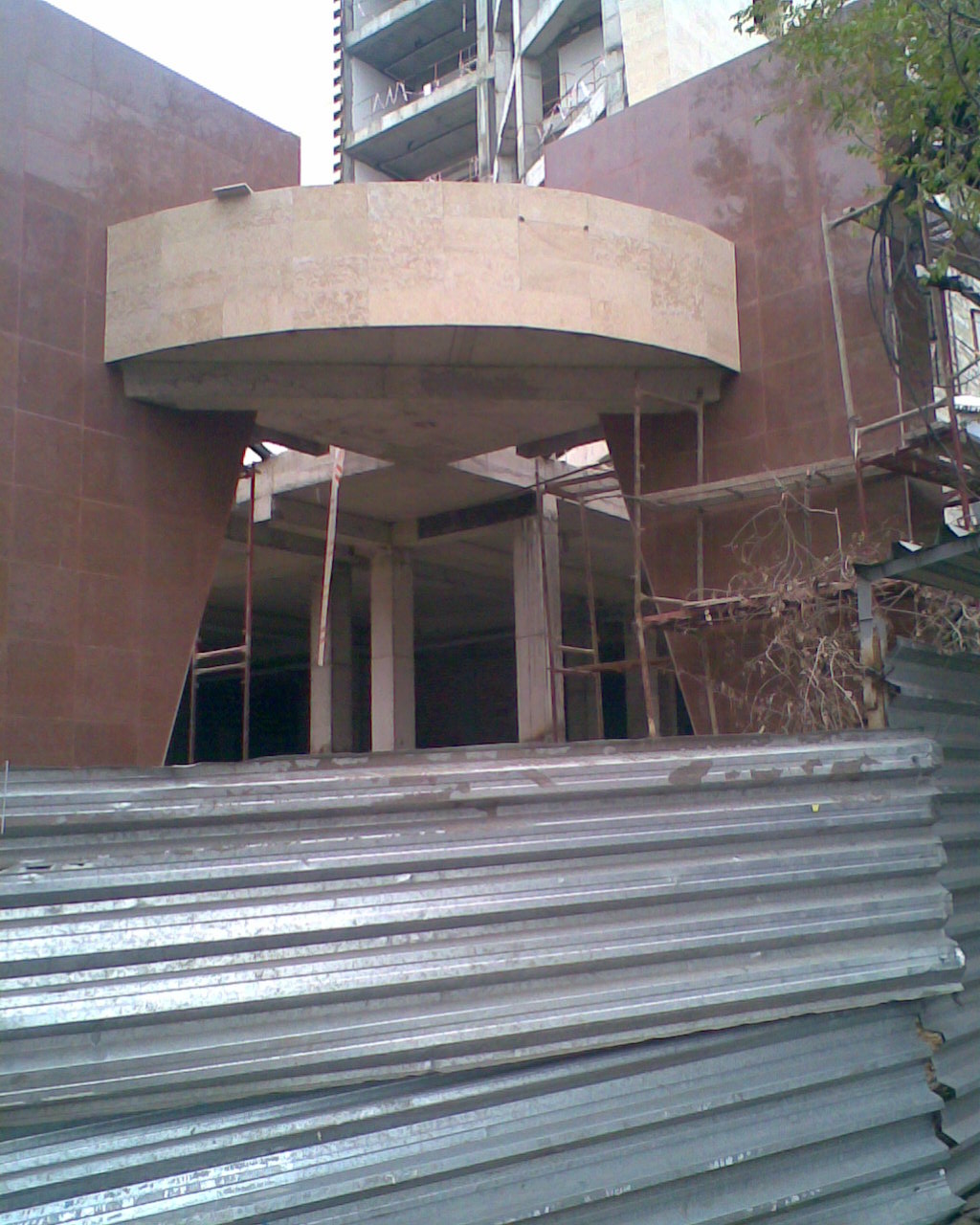
Entrance to "Zhibek Zholy" station (view from Gogol Street) (November 2008)

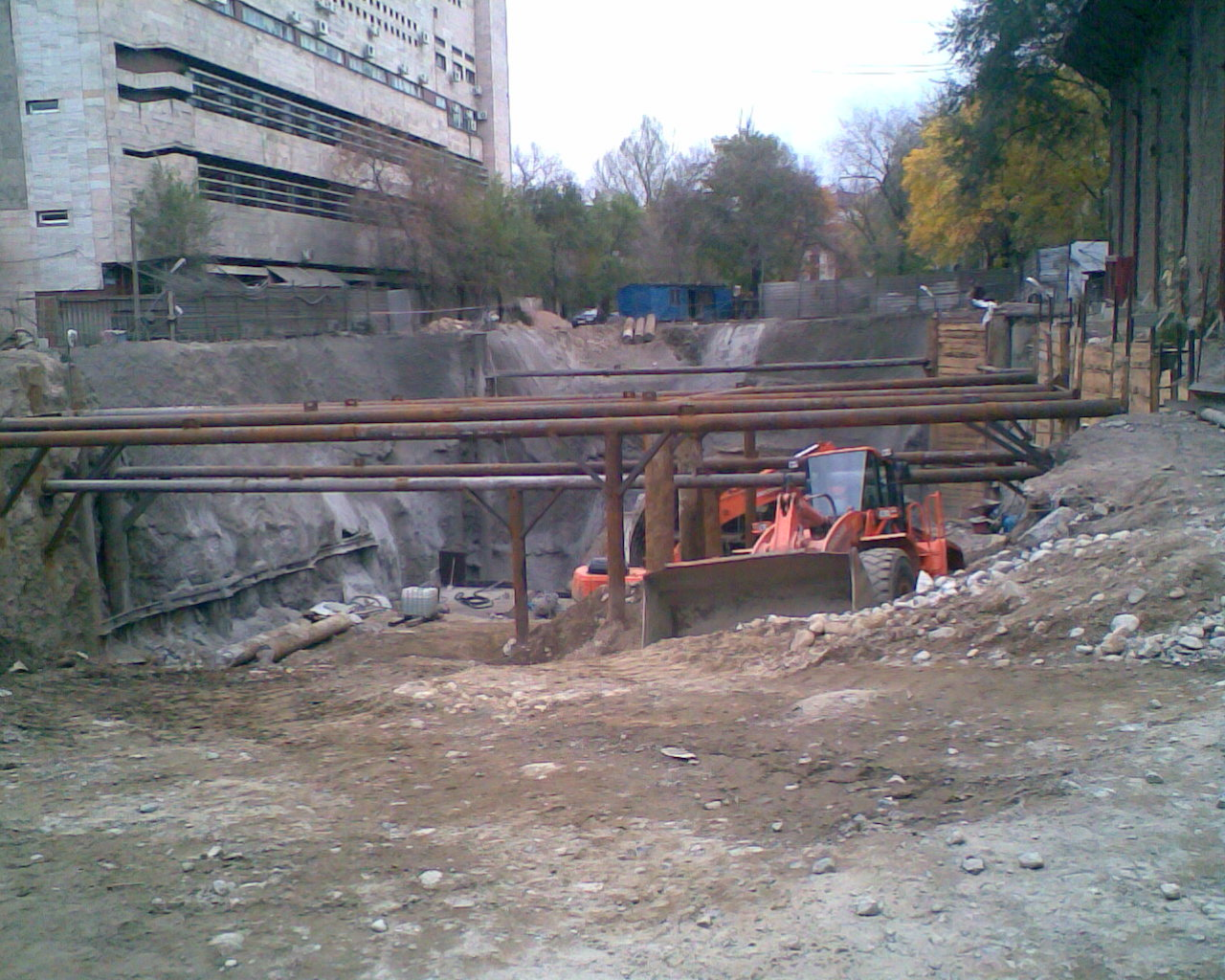
Construction of the entrance to the station "Almaly" (view from Panfilov Street) (October 2008)

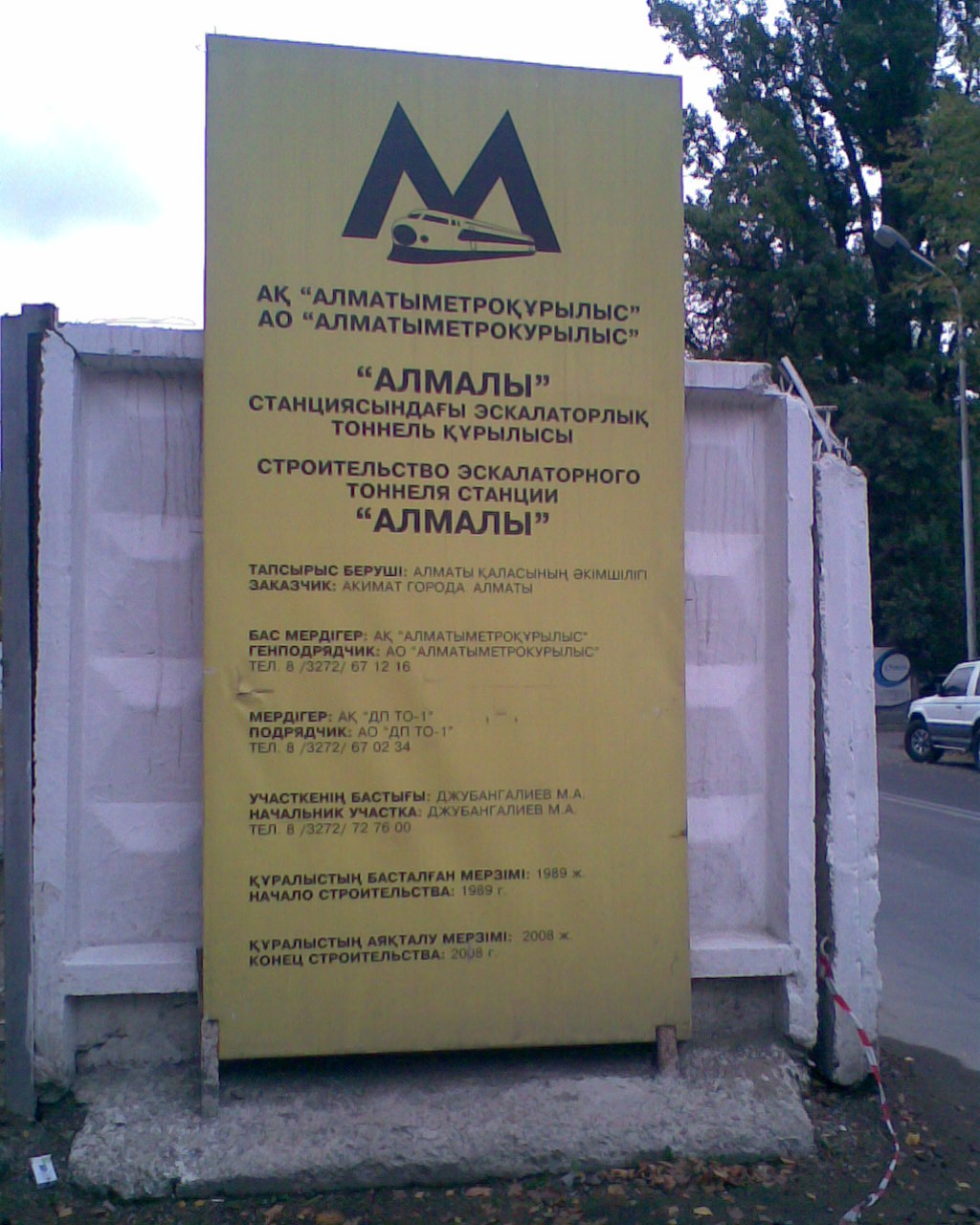
Information board at the entrance to the station "Almaly" under construction (view from Panfilov Street) (October 2008)

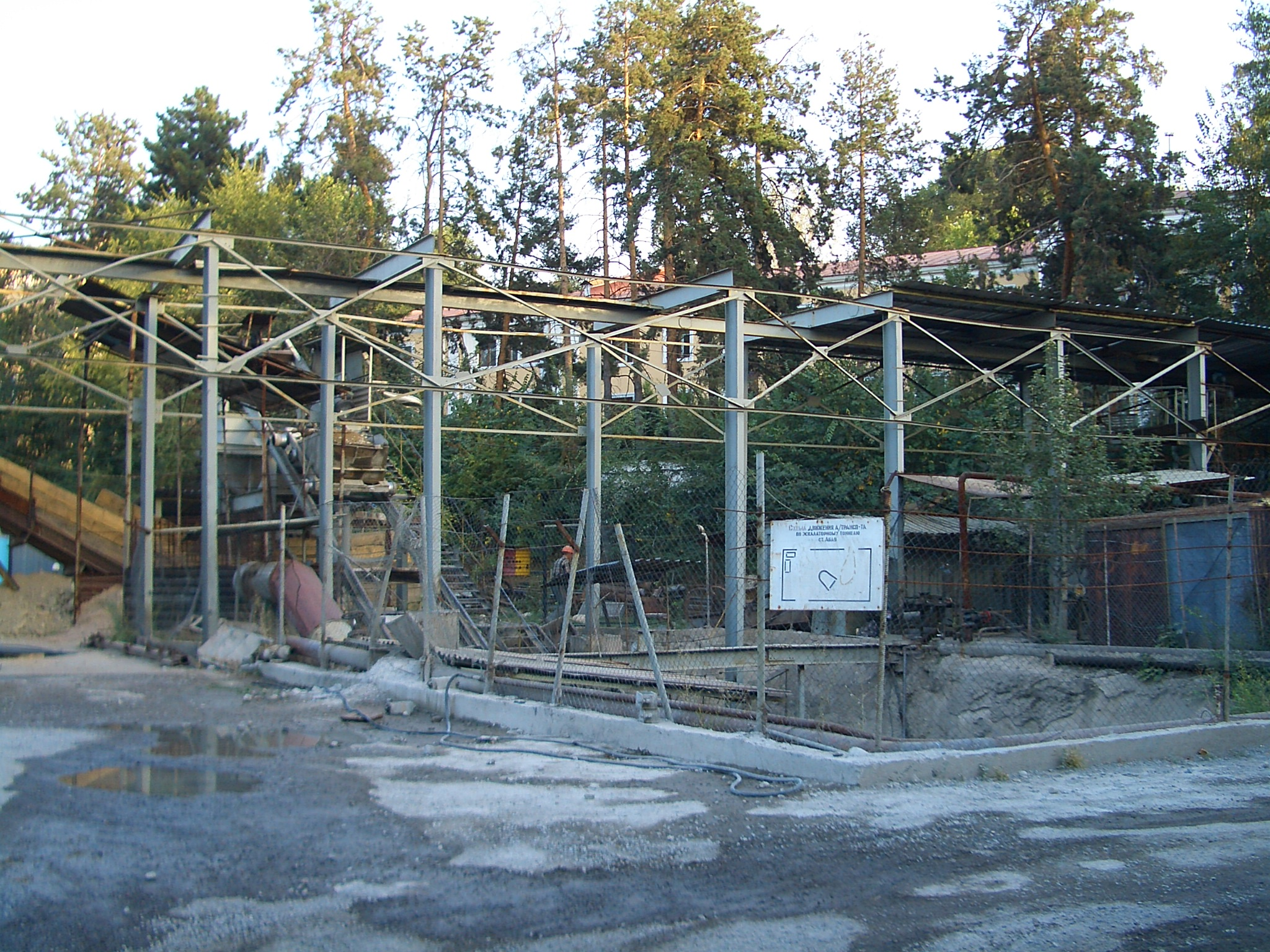
Construction of Abay station (September 2007)

== See also ==
- List of metro systems
- Trams in Almaty
- Almaty Light Rail
