= The Golden Square (Almaty) =

Neighbourhood in Almaty, Kazakhstan

Golden Square (Золотой Квадрат; Zolotoi Kvadrat) is a neighbourhood located in the city center of Almaty, Kazakhstan. It is considered a historical point in Almaty, and numerous prominent governmental buildings are currently located there. The area was originally a prominent area for Almaty's elite social classes, and numerous known poets, politicians, and musicians lived there during the Soviet era. The architecture in the area includes Stalin-era houses with neo-Russian ornamentation and pastel-colored fronts. The square is bordered by the streets Jeltoqsan, Bogenbai, Kunaev, and Abai. The area also includes parks and public gardens, fountains, as well as restaurants and entertainment centers.

== See also ==
- Almaty
