= Second Chui Volost =

Historical state, then a volost in Russia

The Second Chui Volost Алтын Кӧлдиҥ Ураҥкай (Кӧбӧктӧрдиҥ оток)
- 1687–27 (14) June 1913 (Volost was part of the Russian Empire from 1865 to 1913)
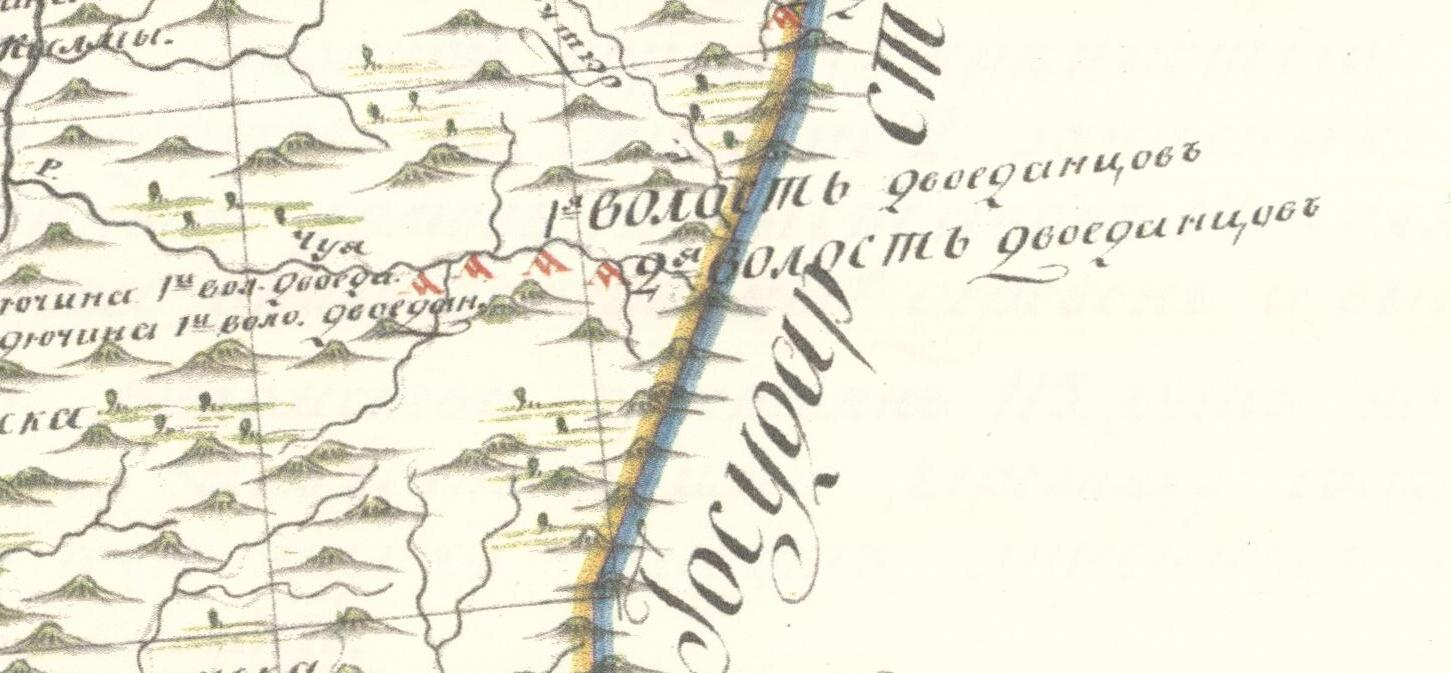
- The Second Chui Volost on the map of Tomsk Governorate in 1821
- Capital: Kuray (Kosh-Agach since 1907)
- Recognised national languages: Telengit language
- Religion: Freedom of religion
- Government: Monarchy

Partial sovereignty
- History
  - Established: 1687
  - Joining the Russian Empire: 24 (12) January 1865
  - Disestablished: 27 (14) June 1913 (Volost was part of the Russian Empire from 1865 to 1913)

Area
  - Total: 19,845 km^{2} (7,662 sq mi)

Population
  - 1911 estimate: 3,104

The Second Chui Volost (Otok of Kebeks, Altan Nuur Urianghai) was a state with partial sovereignty, that existed on the territory of the modern Kosh-Agachsky District of the Altai Republic. In 1865, it became a volost of the Russian Empire and subsequently a district of modern Russia. Most of its territory was inhabited by the Telengits, also known as Altaians-Dvoedans, who were tributaries to the Russian Empire (before 1721, to the Tsardom of Russia) and the Qing Empire (before 1755, to the Dzungar Khanate). It was traditionally ruled by Zaisans of the Ak-Kebek dynasty.

== History ==
In 1687, during a military campaign, Kebegesh, the son of Kayrakan-Yarynak, came to the territory of the Altai Mountains. The Ak-Kebek dynasty descended from Kebegesh. He created the Telengit otok, which he headed himself. This state was inhabited by people who did not accept Russian citizenship, but recognized their dependence on the Qing Empire.

=== Influence of the Qing Empire ===
During the Third Oirat-Manchurian War on the territory of Altai also began to attack the Qing warriors. Unable to defend themselves, most of the Altaians accepted Russian citizenship, meanwhile, the Zaisan of the Second Chui Volost Yarynak and the Zaisan of the First Chui Volost Telebek began to pay taxes to China. For this, the emperor officially recognized the authority of the Teles in the first otok (in the First Chui Volost), and the Ak-Kebeks in the second, equating each of the two zaisans with an official of the third rank, and later bestowed on each the title of "Ukherida".

=== Obligations to Russia and China ===
In the 1750s, the Second Chui Volost fell into a situation in which the residents of otok had to pay taxes to two states. This situation made it possible to maneuver between the two empires and maintain limited sovereignty.

In favor of the Qing Empire, the Chui Telengites paid annual taxes. In 1757, eight Qing ambassadors arrived in the Second Chui Volost for the first time, who collected yasak at the rate of one sable per person. Later yasak for an adult male was equal to 2 skins of sable and 60 skins of squirrels. Children and the elderly were exempt from paying alman.

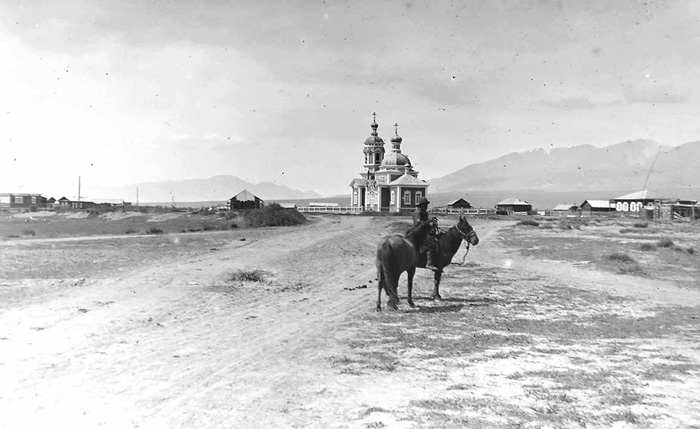
Peter and Paul Church in Kosh-Agach (1911)

Telengits for the Russian Empire were obliged to pay yasak, as well as to protect the property of travelers who studied their region, in rare cases to provide Russian officials with horses. The Dvoedans had no other duties towards Russia. Also, the Russian Empire did not interfere in the management of the Second Chui Volost, which was recorded in the "Charter on the Management of Foreigners" of 1822. Because of this, the Zaisans of The Second Chui Volost had great authority among the Zaisans of the Altai dyuchins and loyal subjects of Russia Altaians.

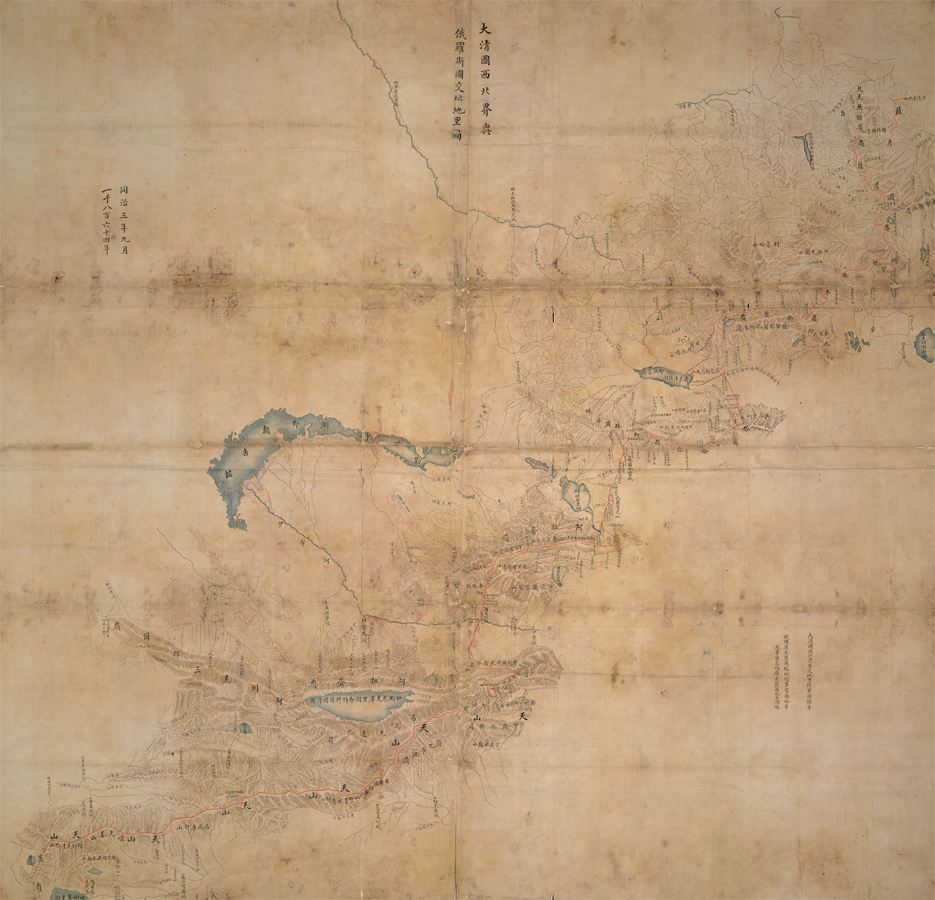
The map of the border between the Russian Empire and the Qing Empire as per the Protocol of Chuguchak of 1864

=== Joining the Russian Empire ===
A turning point in the history of the Second Chui Volost was a visit to Kosh-Agach Tomsk Governor Herman Gustavovich Lerche, which took place in the summer of 1864. The governor agitated local residents about joining Russia. And already January 24 [O.S. 1865] of the year The Second Chui Volost headed by zaisan Chichkan Tesegeshev is part of the Russian Empire.

=== Abolition of the volost ===
According to the Journal of the General Presence of the Tomsk Provincial Administration No. 1164 dated 06/27 (14)/1913, the Second Chui Volost was divided into Kosh-Agach volost and Kirghiz volost. The dissolution also affected seven Altai dyuchins and the First Chui Volost

== Geography ==
Vasily Radlov wrote that the Telengit nomads began above the confluence of the Yodro River with the Chuya. A large number of Dvoedans roamed the territory of the Kurai steppe. In the Chuya Steppe, they roamed in the northwestern part of it.

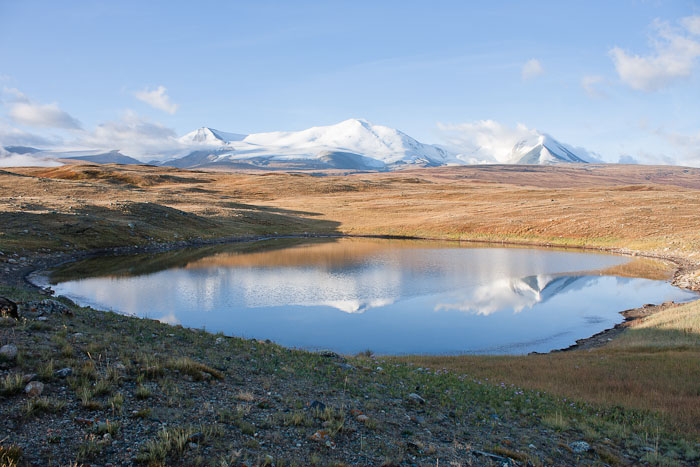
Ukok Plateau

After the Second Chui Volost became part of Russia in the 1860s, the first expedition to the Ukok Plateau by Ivan Fedorovich Bobkov took place. This traveler described his observations from the Chingistai border picket up the Bukhtarma River through Ukok to the upper reaches of the Akalakha River. In this work, the general characteristics of nature were outlined and recommendations for its economic use were given. In 1878, the Ukok was crossed by M. V. Pevtsov's expedition, which was heading from southeastern Kazakhstan to Northwestern Mongolia and further to the Qing Empire. M. V. Pevtsov performed the first complete physical and geographical survey of the area. He also estimated the height of the snow line and tried to determine the absolute heights of the dominant peaks of the Kanas and Tavan-Bogdo-Ula mountain groups. Along the way, the expedition collected the first zoological collection of mammals, birds, fish and reptiles for the Ukok Plateau. The collected herbarium consisted of about 200 species of flowers, and the mineralogical collection consisted of 100 samples of minerals and rocks.

=== The State border ===
As Pyotr Chikhachyov wrote, a roughly sketched pile of stones, skulls and horns of wild sheep served as the border between the Dvoedans and Tuvans. All the border guard posts were occupied by Mongol soldiers, who had the only weapon - a bow and arrow, and only some had rough-made guns.

== Government structure ==
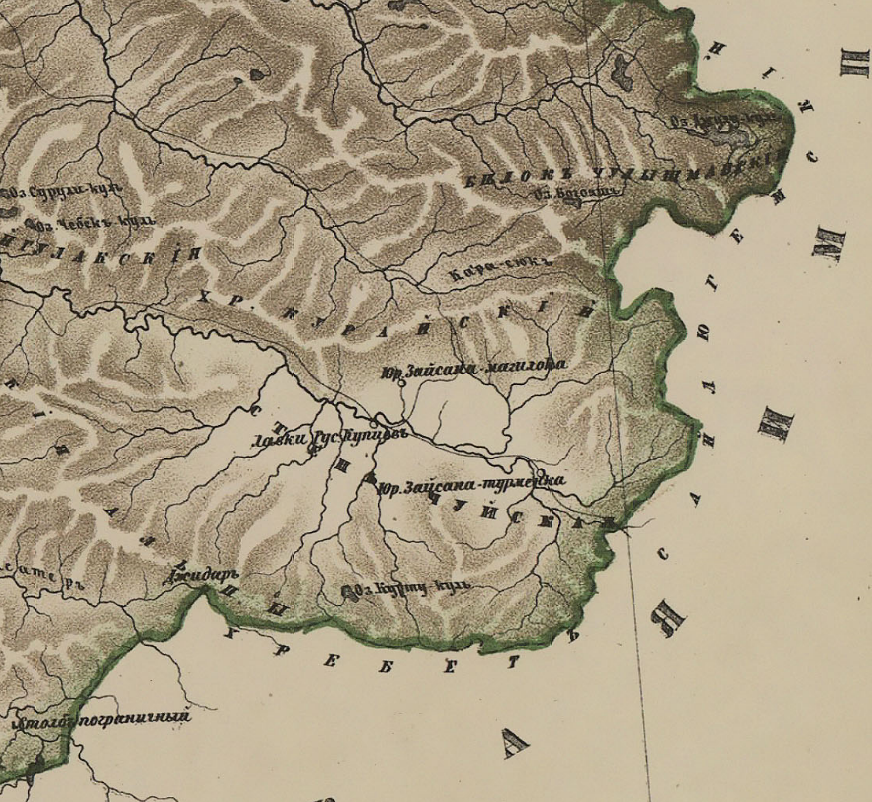
The Chuya Steppe, the Kurai Mountains and the shops of Russian merchants, 1871

=== Administrative division ===
Otok was divided into armans, and at the head of each was one demichi, representing one of the numerous clans. In 1897, there were 4 demichi in the Second Chuya Volost from the following families: Mool, Kipchaks, Ak-Kebek and Sagal.

=== Government positions ===
The head of the otok was a Zaisan or Prince. He was a representative of the House of Ak-Kebek, whose power was passed down from his father. The entire territory of otok was owned by Zaisan, even after becoming part of Russia and paid him about 50 or 100 rubles a year. The prince had a servant under his command, Kodichi, who was obliged to follow zaisan everywhere.

The following officials were subordinate to him:

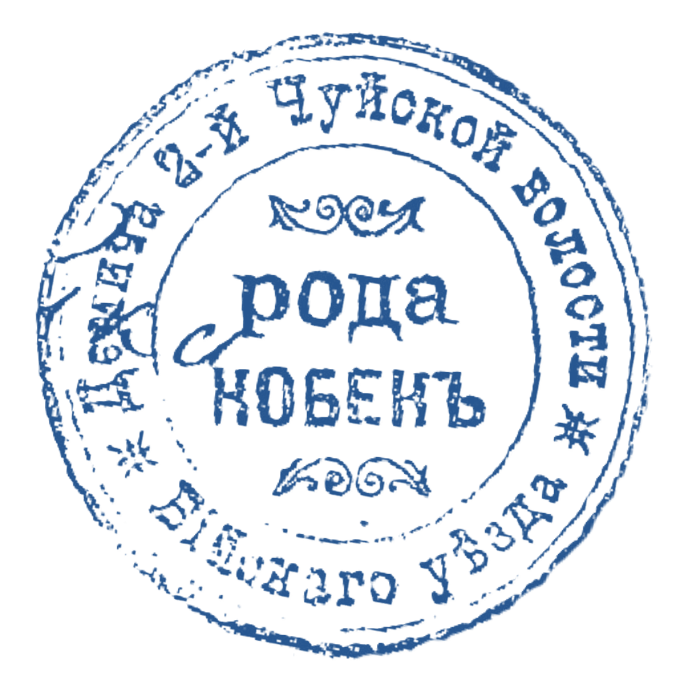
The seal of demichi from the House of Ak-Kebek

- Demichi is responsible for one of the administrative divisions of the volost.
- Boshko
- Kyundi - kept order in the volost.

== Population ==
=== Demographics ===
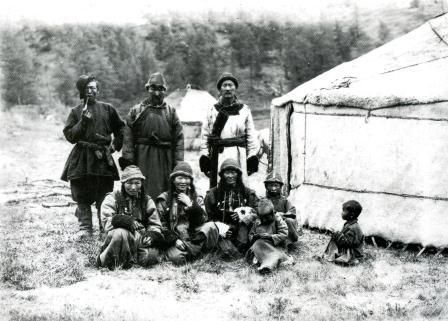
Residents Of The Second Chui Volost (Karagem Valley, 1897)

In 1826, Alexander von Bunge visited the Second Chui Volost, and he noted that the local population is two thousand people. Vasily Radlov, who visited the dvoedants in the 1860s, said that there were from two to three thousand people. The Altai spiritual mission counted two thousand Telengits in the Volost. No one kept statistical records of the population in the Second Chui Volost until the end of the 19th century. By the end of the 19th century, the population was 1,645 people.

In 1911, according to the "List of populated places of Tomsk province", 3,104 people lived in the Second Chui Volost.

=== Ethnic groups ===
- The Telengits, a Turkic ethnic group that made up the majority of the population of the Second Chui Volost.
- Russian serfs who fled to the border with China. The government of the Second Chui Volost never extradited serfs to Russia. The fugitives on Chuya established their settlements and could freely trade with the Telengites, which was very profitable.
- The Tuvans, a Turkic ethnic group that has long been at odds with the inhabitants of the Second Chuya Volost, which is even reflected in folk legends. In the 1880s, a family from Tuva fled to the Second Chui Volost, which was accepted as a subject by Prince Ochurdyap Mangdaev and allocated them to the family clan Kara-Kebeks.
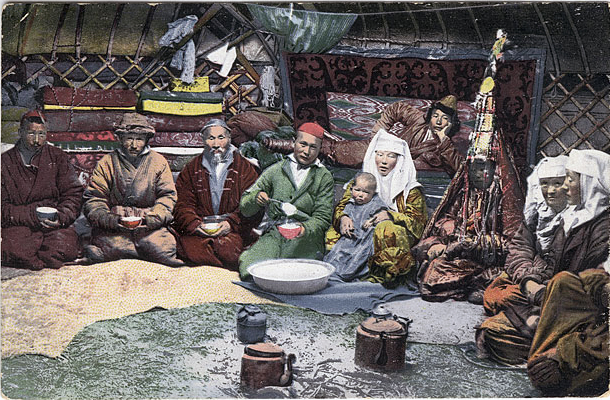
- Inside a Altai Kazakh yurt. 1911-1914
  Altai Kazakhs is a Turkic ethnic group that appeared in the Second Chui Volost for the first time in 1870-1880. Kazakhs from the Koljibayev (Sarykaldakov) family, who were cramped in their native lands in the Chingistai and Archety tracts, were among the first to migrate to Altai. They were accepted into the Second Chuya Volost by Prince Ochurdyap Mangdaev. He assigned them lands to live in, these were the valleys of the Tarkhata, Yasater and Chaganburgazy rivers. For this, the Koljibayevs (Sarykaldakovs) paid Zaisan 50-100 rubles a year. In 1893, about 100 caravans of Kazakhs of the Chingistai family migrated to Chuya. However, these Kazakhs behaved very aggressively in Chuya - they stole cattle, ravaged and seized the nomads of the indigenous population. In 1894, the Russian authorities expelled most of the Kazakhs from the Altai Mountains. But some of them managed to stay in the Second Chui Volost. In 1913, the Second Chui Volos was abolished, and in its place appeared Kosh-Agach volost and a special Kirghiz volost for Kazakhs, which was formed in the Yustyt tract.

=== Self-designation ===
Locals called themselves "Chui-ulus", since they lived in the valley of the Chuya River.

== Economy ==
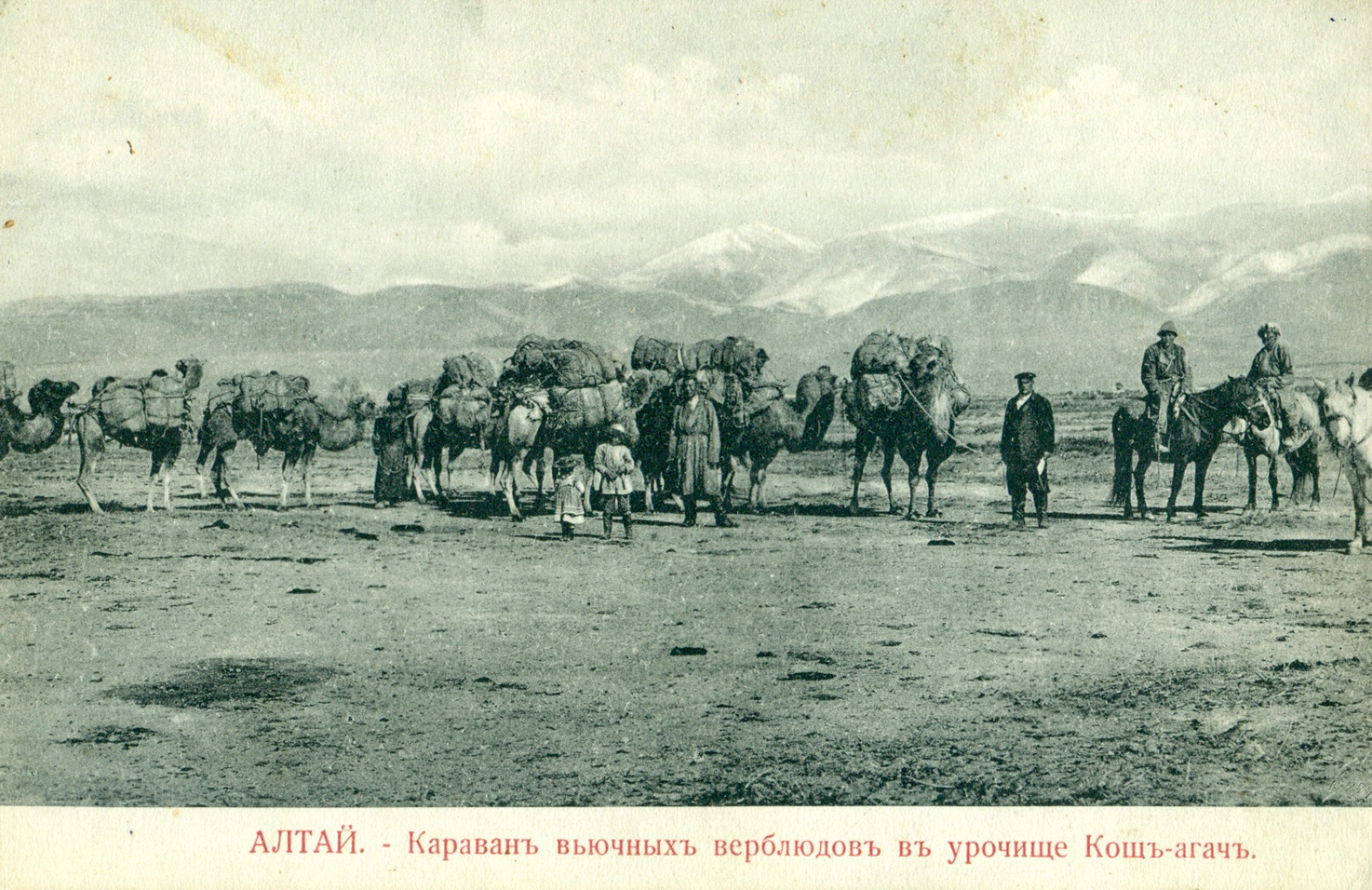
Altai. - Caravan of pack camels in the Kosh-Agach tract

=== Trade in Chuya ===
Trade in Chuya was an economic activity aimed at the purchase and sale of goods from the First and Second Chui Volosts and merchants from Russia, China and Tuva. Trade was carried out on the territory of the Second Chui Volost, and Kosh-Agach was built up with warehouses of Russian merchants. Thanks to the active trade in Chuya, the Chuisky tract appeared. Trade with China began thanks to the annual religious processions of the Derbets and the Mongol army. Cross-border trade between Russia and China was prohibited until the 1860s, but residents of the Second Chui Volost could freely trade with China and Russia. Russian merchants have been trading with Second Chui Volost since the middle of the 18th century, making huge profits from trading with the residents of Chuya.

=== Animal husbandry ===
China has had a huge impact on many areas of otok's life, such as animal husbandry. In addition to traditional Telengit breeding, sheep, goats, cows and horses were also bred by local residents, which the Russians called "Chinese cows".

== Culture ==
=== Music ===
In the Second Chui Volost, both ordinary singers (Altay: кожоҥчы, romanized: qojoñçı) and throat singers (Altay: кайчы, romanized: qayçı) were popular.
