= House of Ak-Kebek =

Aristocratic dynasty

House of Ak-Kebek Ак-Кöбöк
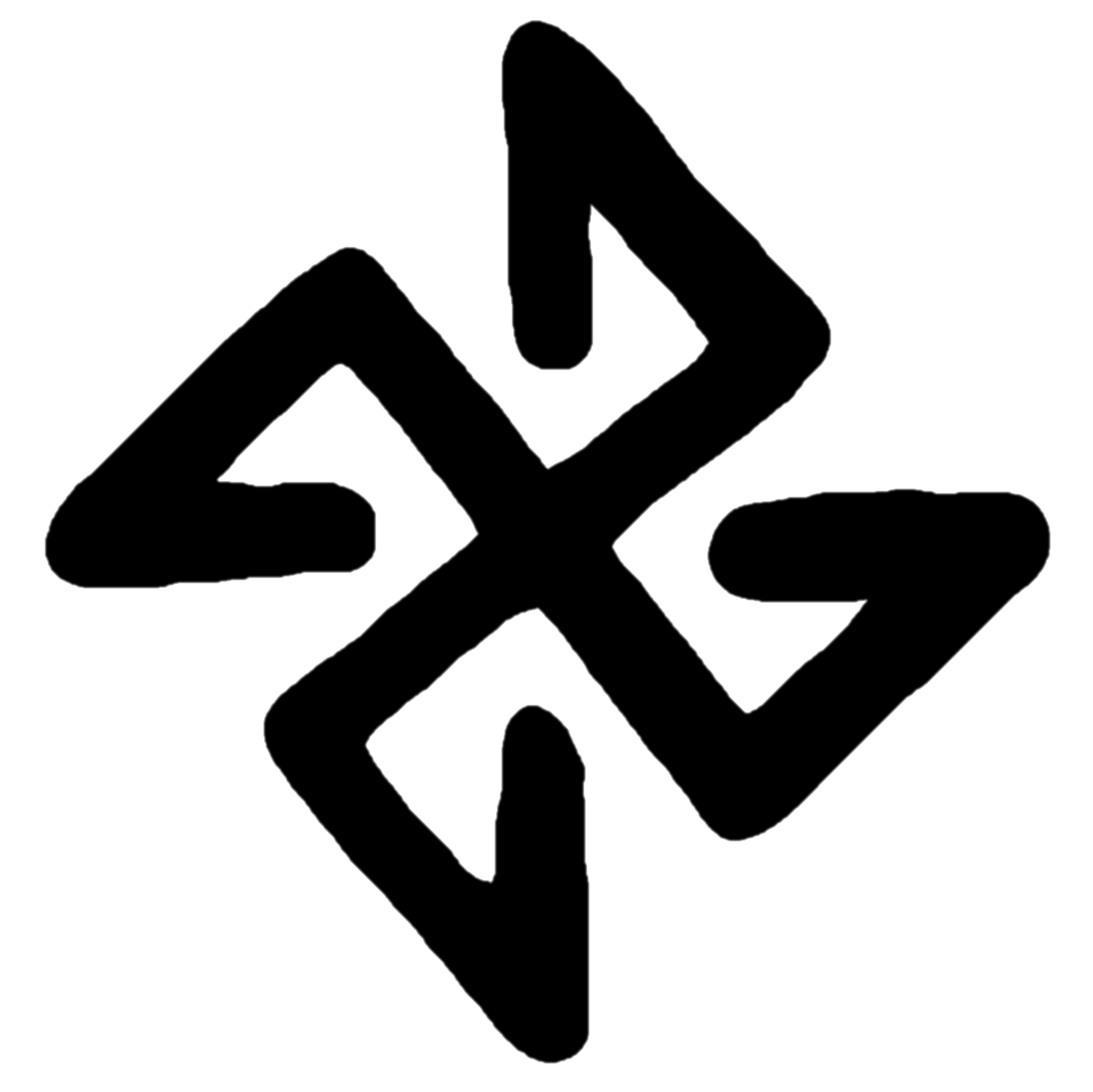
- Tamga "Saraky"
- Country: Second Chui Volost (Since 1865, the volost has been part of the Russian Empire)
- Founded: 1687
- Founder: Prince Kebegesh
- Current head: Sergey Ochurdyapov
- Final ruler: Kudaibergen Ochurdyapov
- Titles: Zaisan/Prince of the Second Chui Volost; Ukhirida

The House of Ak-Kebek (Altay: Ак-Кöбöк) is an aristocratic dynasty that ruled in the Otok of Kebeks from 1687 to 1913. The founder of the house was Prince Kebegesh, the son of the Kyrgyz prince Kayrakan-Yarynak from the Khirgys dynasty.

== History ==
=== Origins and rise to power ===
In the summer of 1687, having received an order from Galdan Boshugtu Khan, Kayrakan-Yarynak with a detachment of 600 soldiers went to help in the fight against the Mongols. In September, near Lake Teletskoye, the Mongols blocked the path of the Kyrgyz army heading for the Dzungarian Khan. The battle lasted four days, and as a result, the Dzungars and the Kyrgyz were defeated. Kyrgyz losses amounted to 300 people, and Yarynak died in battle. Viktor Butanaev assumed that some of the surviving Kyrgyz warriors, led by Kebegesh, joined the Altai tribes and gave rise to the Ak-Kebek dynasty At the same time, the Second Chui Volost was formed, which did not recognize dependence on Russia and China (until 1755, the Dzungar Khanate), and zaisans from the Ak-Kebek dynasty began to rule the state. The headquarters of the first ruler, Zaisan Kebegesh, was located in the Sary-Tash tract.

== Political recognition and status of Zaisan ==
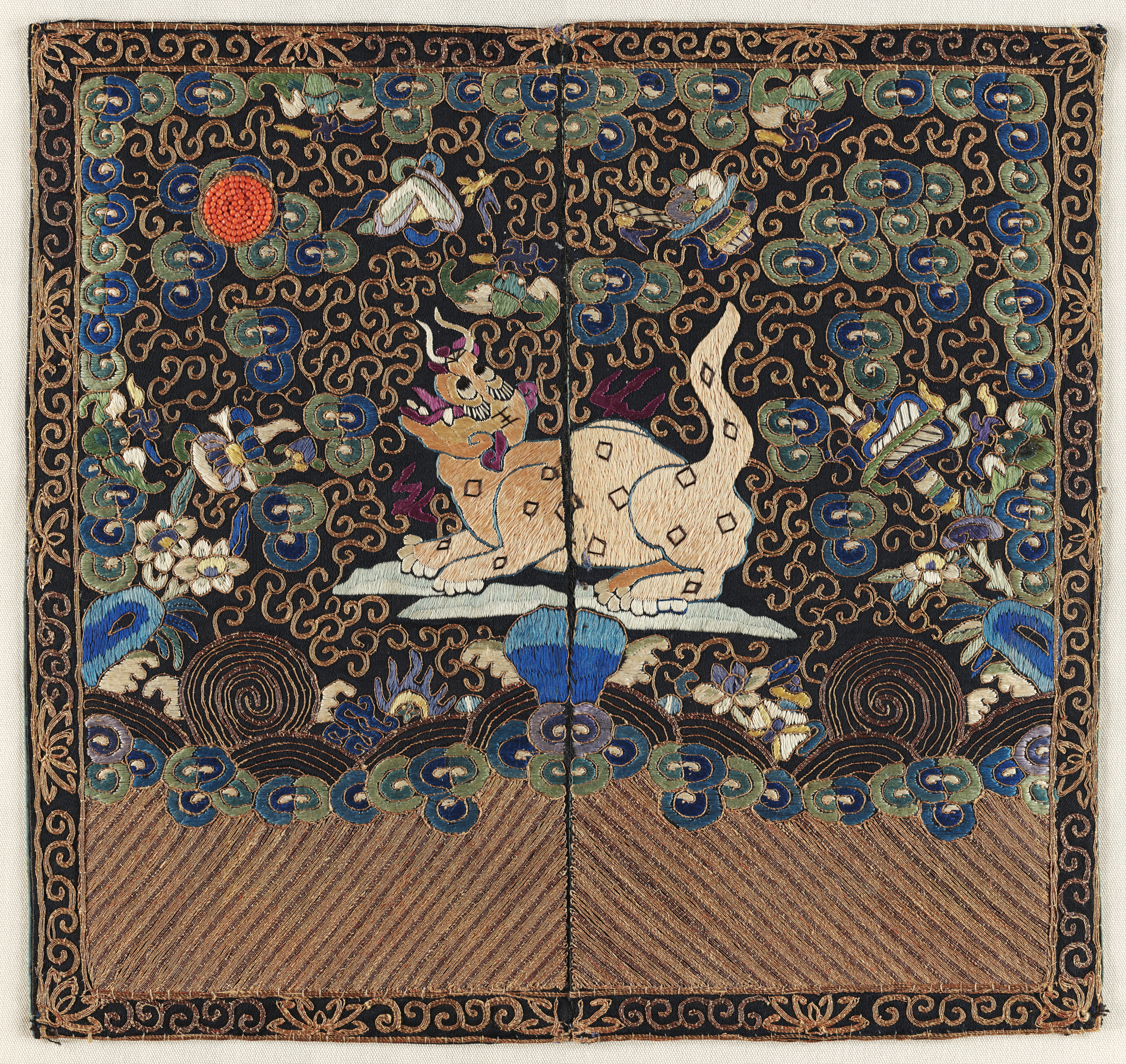
Military rank badge with leopard

=== Relations of the Qing Empire to the House of Ak-Kebek ===
In 1757, the Qing Emperor officially recognized the power of Zaisan Yarynak of the Ak-Kebek dynasty (Kebegesh's son) and granted him the hereditary rank of an official of the third rank. That is, the Qing Empire recognized the Ak-Kebeks as the ruling dynasty in the Second Chui Volost. According to this status, Zaisan had to wear a mandarin square on his dress, which depicted a leopard. It was also necessary to wear a Chinese hat with a blue sapphire on top. In 1818, the Qing Emperor granted the Prince of the Second Chui Volost the hereditary title of Ukherida.

=== Relations of the Russian Empire to the House of Ak-Kebeks ===
By decree of Catherine the Great in 1763, Zaisans were equated to the rank of major. And they were also exempt from paying taxes. According to the "List of Populated places of the Russian Empire" (according to the data of 1859), Russia considered the Zaisans of the Second Chui Volost as monarchical rulers.

In 1865, by the decision of Zaisan Chychkan Tesegeshev, the Second Chui Volost became part of the Russian Empire. After this event, the Russian government left the right to govern the volost to representatives of the Ak-Kebek dynasty. After joining Russia, the Zaisans of the Second Chuya Volost officially held the position of "Tribal elders", they had much more rights than the Volost foreman. Zaisan could punish any guilty person without a trial. It is worth noting that researcher Leonid Pavlovich Potapov believes that the naming of "Tribal headman" is incorrect, since the Zaisans ruled not one clan, but a large number of families and land

== Downfall ==
In 1913, the Second Chui Volost was divided into Kosh-Agach volost and Kirghiz volost. Zaisan Kudaibergen-Pavel Ochurdyapov turned out to be the last ruler of the Second Chui Volost. Since that time, the Ak-Kebeks lost their legal rights as zaisans, but remained in the position of nobles. In 1917, the decree of the All-Russian Central Executive Committee "On the destruction of estates and civil ranks" came into force, which meant the liquidation of all estates in the RSFSR. Despite this, the members of the dynasty did not give up their Zaisan titles.

=== Political repression of the 1930s ===
During the period of political repression in the 1930s, many representatives of the Ak-Kebek dynasty were called "enemies of the people", exiled and killed. In February 1930, Prince Kudaibergen Ochurdyapov was arrested, accused of counterrevolutionary activities. His trial resulted in a death sentence under Article 58-II of the RSFSR Criminal Code. His wife, Princess Kuba Maikhievna, and their youngest son, Herman, were exiled to Narym. After the murder of Kudaibergen Ochurdyapov, his son Anton Kudaibergenovich became the Head of the House of Ak-Kebeks. On March 1, 1931, he was arrested and charged with counterrevolutionary activities. The court sentenced Anton Kudaibergenovich to five years in prison. Since he had no sons, but only two daughters, Princess Papa and Princess Didya (Ida), after his arrest, his brother Boktor-Ivan Kudaibergenovich, became the Head of the House of Ak-Kebeks. The fate of Anton Kudaibergenovich remains unknown, as information about him has been lost since 1931. Zaisan Boktor Kudaibergenovich was arrested in March 1936 and charged with counterrevolutionary activities. On March 29, he was evicted along with his wife and children to the village of Altayskoye-35 in the Akmola region of the Kazakh SSR.His wife and daughters died on the way, and he arrived in Kazakhstan alone.

== The Dynasty after the 1930s ==
The son of the last Zaisan of the Second Chui Volost Kudaibergen-Pavel Ochurdyapov, Boktor-Ivan Ochurdyapov, took part in the Second World War. He was at war from September 1941 to 1945. On June 30, 1945, he was awarded the Order of the Red Star.

His younger brother Platon Ochurdyapov also took part in World War II, but went missing in 1944 or in March 1945.

In 1956, the princely family returned to their homeland, having received official permission from the Gorno-Altai Autonomous Oblast. In Altai, they settled in Kokorya. Zaisan Boktor Kudaibergenovich worked at the collective farm "40 years of October" of the Kokorinsky Village Council.

In 1977, Zaisan Boktor Kudaibergenovich died. His eldest son Nikolai Boktorovich Ochurdyapov became the new Head of the House of Ak-Kebek. At that time, Nikolai Botorovich was already an officer in the USSR Navy and worked as a music teacher at the Kosh-Agach school. He was engaged in musical and pedagogical activities, organizing cultural and patriotic events in the Altai Republic. His latest creative project was the production of the film "Skelet. Istoriya odnogo Egoista", released in 2022. He died on June 29, 2023. His son Sergey Nikolaevich became the Head of the House of the House of Ak-Kebek.

== Zaisans ==
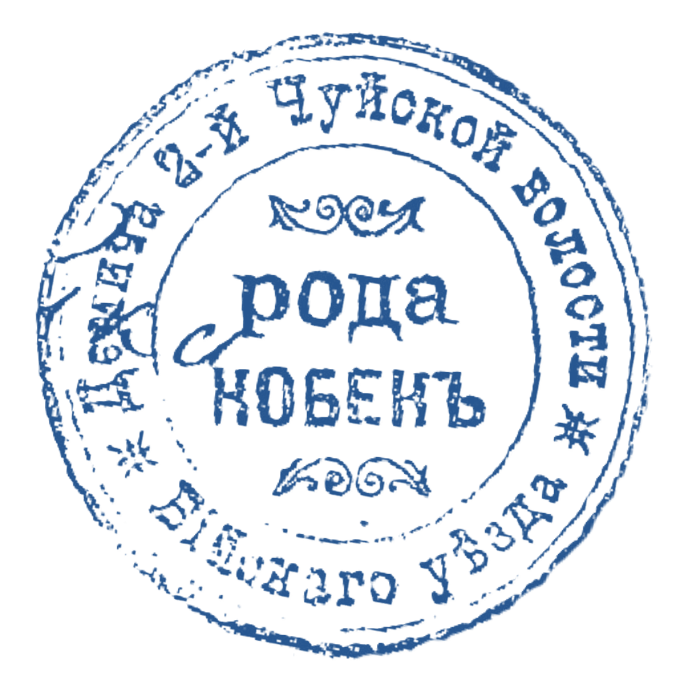
The seal of the demichi of the Second Chui Volost from the House of Ak-Kebek

The list of Zaisans who ruled in the Second Chui Volost, which is presented in the book "The Past and Present of the Chui Land" by Viktor Kertikovich Maikhiev, Honored Worker of Culture of the Altai Republic, member of the Union of Writers of Russia:

- Kebegesh
- Yarynak
- Chebek
- Mongol Chebekov
- Chychkan Tesegeshev
- Mangday Chychkanov
- Ochurdyap Mangdaev
- Kudaibergen-Pavel Ochurdyapov

=== Heads of the house of Ak-Kebek after 1930 ===
- Anton Kudaibergenov
- Boktor-Ivan Kudaibergenovich Ochurdyapov (Military person; 1909-1977)
- Nikolay Boktorovich Ochurdyapov (Art worker; 06.01.1948 - 29.06.2023)
- Sergey Nikolaevich Ochurdyapov

== Princesses ==
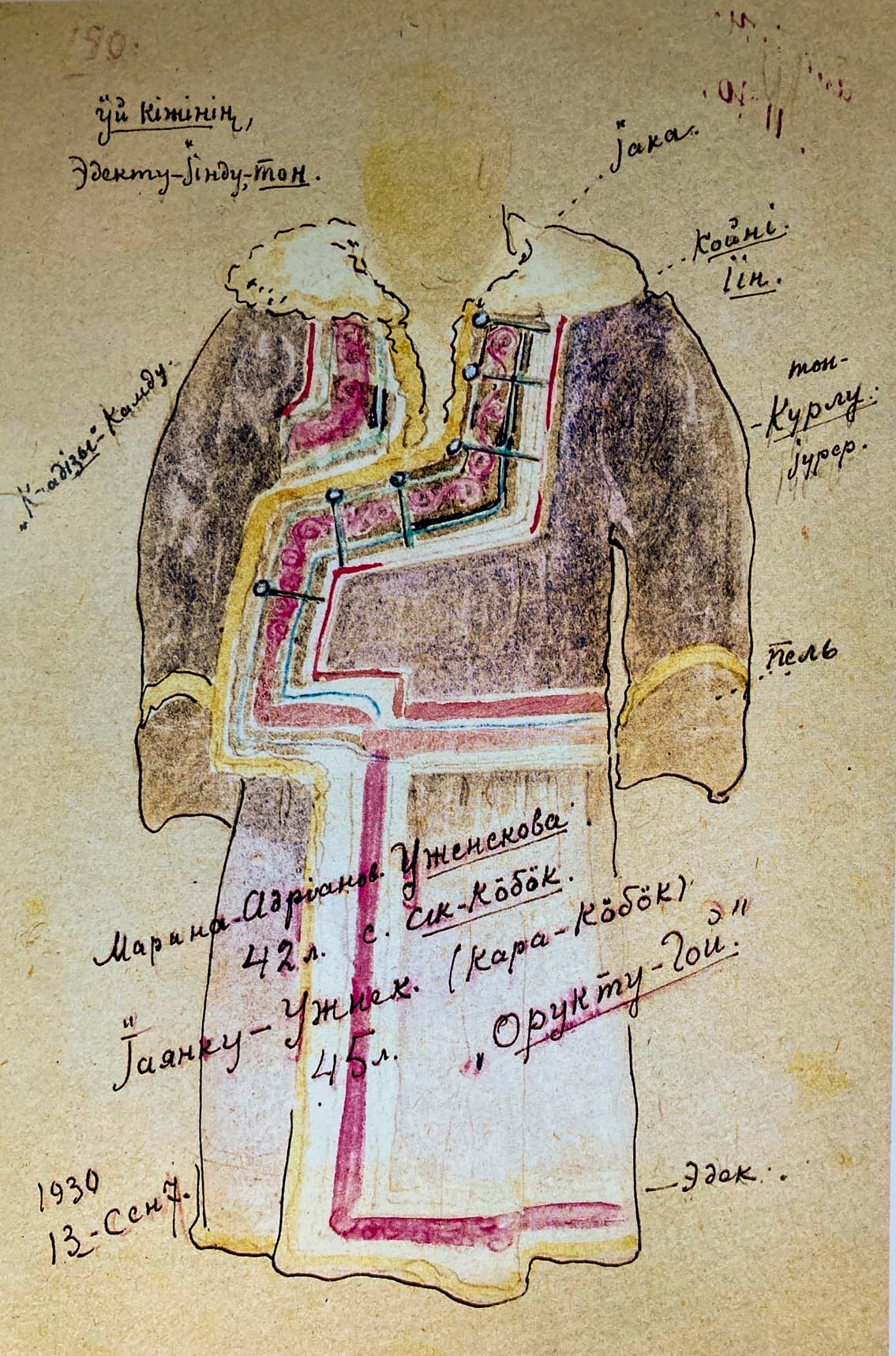
Grigory Gurkin - Women's long-skirted sheepskin coat (1930). This fur coat belonged to a woman from the Ak-Kebek family.

Princess Ditasay - the wife of Prince Kebegesh The first Princess was Ditasay, the wife of the founder of the Ak-Kebek dynasty, Prince Kebegesh. She was the daughter of a noble Soyon ruler. Kebegesh noticed her during a visit to the Tuvan Lands, and later brought her to his otok. This act of the prince caused discontent among Tuvinians.

The princely family of Kebegesh and Ditasai had seven children, the youngest of whom was named after his mother, Ditas. He gave rise to the new Ditas clan.

Princess Kebegesheva - the wife of Prince Yarynak.

Princess Yarynakova - the first wife of Prince Chebek.

Princess Kurundshuk - the second wife of Prince Chebek and the mother of Prince Mongol Chebekov. In 1826, Alexander von Bunge met with her. Then she was about 40 years old and she was distinguished by her beauty and vivacity of speech. She was very well-mannered and witty

Princess Tesegesheva - the wife of Prince Chychkan Tesegeshev. Vasily Radlov met her in 1860. She was wearing a fox fur coat lined with pink silk fabric. The princess wore silver jewelry.

Princess Chychkanova - the wife of Prince Mangday Chychkanov.

Princess Mangdaeva - the wife of Prince Ochurdyap Mangdaev.

Princess Kuba Ochurdyapova - the wife of Prince Kudaibergen-Pavel Ochurdyapov.

== Land ownership ==
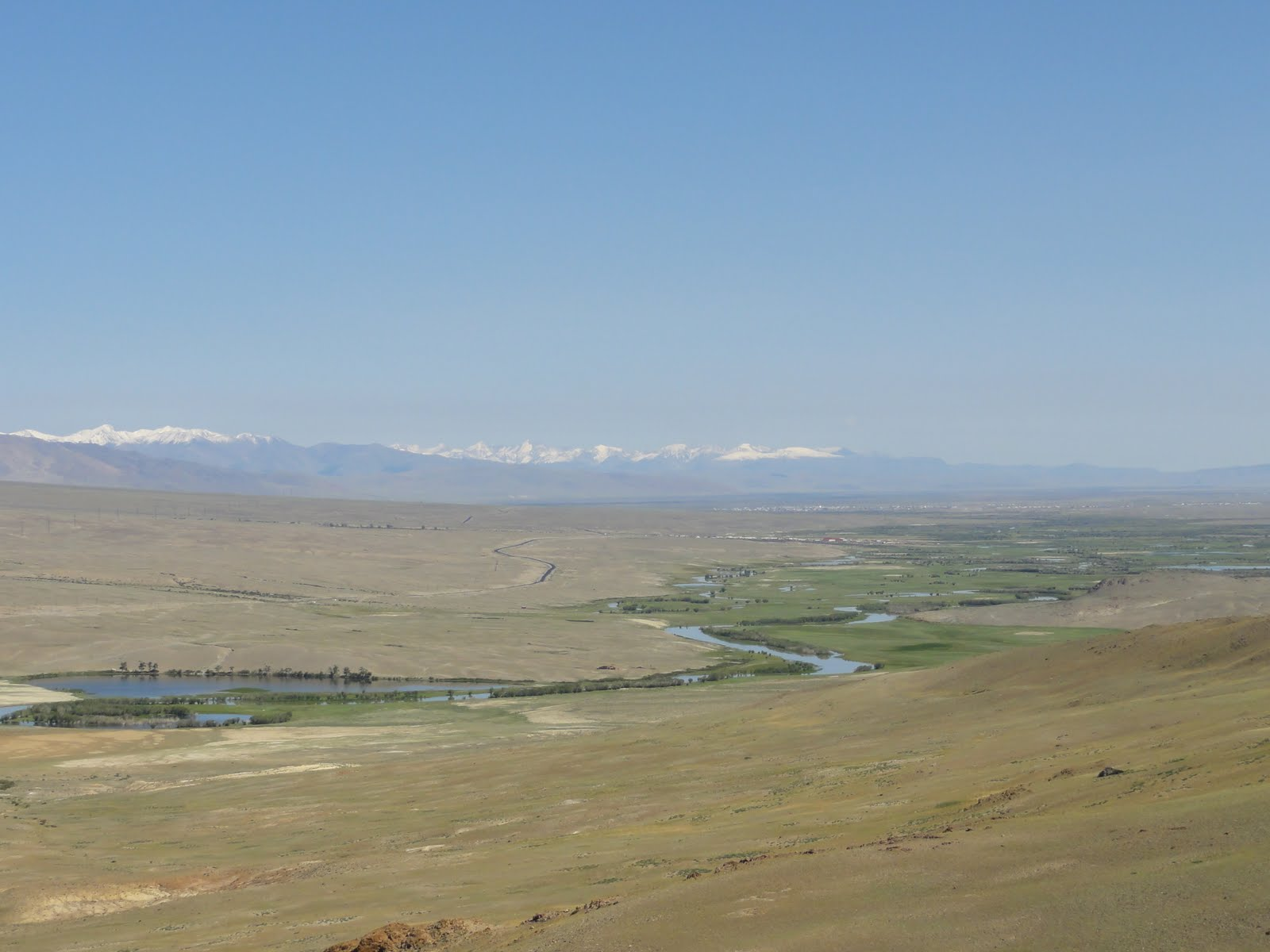
Chuya Steppe.

In pre-revolutionary Russia, the Zaisans of the Ak-Kebek dynasty, after becoming part of Russia, owned the territory of the Second Chui Volost. This land was given to them for personal use by the Imperial Cabinet. When the Kazakhs came to the Chui lands in the second half of the XIX century, they personally asked for permission to settle with Prince Ochurdyap Mangdaev, and paid him about 50 or 100 rubles a year.

== Tamga ==
The Ak-Kebek dynasty had a tamga called Saraky (Altay: Саракай). This sign is associated with the goddess Umay. The tamga resembles a swastika, which meant the point of connection between Heaven and Earth.

— Royal house — House of Ak-Kebek Founding year: 17th century
Preceded by New title	Second Chui Volost; 1687–1913	Otok abolished Became Kosh-Agachsky Volost
