= Sergey Ochurdyapov =

Russian political figure (born 1974)

Sergey Nikolaevich Ochurdyapov
- Сергей Николаевич Очурдяпов

Head of the Inspectorate for State Protection of Cultural Heritage Objects of the Altai Republic
- Incumbent
- Assumed office 13 September 2017

Deputy of the 4th State Assembly of the Altai Republic
- In office 2006–2010

Personal details
- Born: 24 February 1974 (age 52) Kokorya, Kosh-Agachsky District, Gorno-Altai Autonomous Oblast, RSFSR, USSR
- Citizenship: Russia

Sergey Nikolaevich Ochurdyapov (Russian: Сергей Николаевич Очурдяпов; 24 February 1974, Kokorya, Kosh-Agachsky District, Gorno-Altai Autonomous Oblast, RSFSR, USSR.) is a political and public figure of the Altai Republic, Honored Worker of Culture of the Altai Republic, deputy State Assembly of the Altai Republic (2006-2010), member of the Public Chamber of the Altai Republic (2011—2017), late member of the Civic Chamber of the Russian Federation. Since 2020, he has been included in the personnel reserve of the President of Russia. He is the Head of the House of Ak-Kebek.

== Biography ==
Born on February 24, 1974, in the family of Nikolai Boktorovich Ochurdyapov and Anisiya Mikhailovna Ochurdyapova. In 1996 he graduated from Gorno-Altaisk State University, majoring in History and Law, and in 1999 he graduated as a postgraduate in Archeology. In 2003, he graduated from the same university with a degree in Law. He is a direct descendant of Prince Ochurdyap.

== Political career ==
Sergey Nikolaevich began his career as a teacher of additional education at the Center for Children's Creativity of the Kosh-Agachsky district. A little later, namely since 2000, he became chairman of the political council of the local branch of the All-Russian Political Party "Unity" of the Kosh-Agach district.

From 2006 to 2010 Sergey Ochurdyapov was a deputy of the State Assembly - El Kurultai of the Altai Republic. By decree of the head of the Altai Republic, Chairman of the Government of the Altai Republic Alexander Berdnikov, Sergey Ochurdyapov was appointed to the post of Head of the Inspectorate for State Protection of Cultural Heritage Objects of the Altai Republic on September 13.

In September 2022, Sergey Ochurdyapov presented for consideration a draft resolution of the Government of the Republic of Armenia "On Amendments to subparagraph 5 of paragraph 10 of Section III of the Regulations on the Inspection for the State Protection of Cultural Heritage Objects of the Republic of Altai".

== Public activities ==
In the late nineties, Sergey Nikolaevich was the founder and head of the Museum of Local Lore based on the Center for Children's Creativity of the Kosh-Agach district

Since that period, he began to actively participate in various international forums on the preservation of Telengits — the indigenous small population of the Altai Republic, while being one of the representatives of this people. In 2005, he was one of the 350 delegates and one of the representatives of this ethnic group at the Russian Association of Indigenous Peoples of the North. Then he raised the issue of preserving the land on which Telengits traditionally lived.

On March 27, 2006, in Curitiba, which is located in Brazil, the Eighth meeting of the Conference of the Parties to the Convention on Biological Diversity. The press conference was attended by representatives of indigenous peoples from seven regions of the world, including Russia. Sergey Ochurdyapov, Polina Shulbaeva Tatiana Degas acted as delegates from Russian Association of Indigenous Peoples of the North.

In 2008 Sergey represented Russia at the International indigenous Forum on biodiversity, held in Germany. Also present with him from Russia were: Olga Timofeeva-Tereshkina, Anna Naikanchina, Polina Shulbaeva, Tatiana Degai and Galina Volkova. At this meeting, the importance of preserving genetic resources located in the territories of indigenous peoples and the possibility of their use in various spheres of life was highlighted. This was enshrined in article 15 (ABS).

In October 2010 Sergey Ochurdyapov took part in at the Tenth Conference of the Parties to the Convention on Biological Diversity in the Japanese city of Nagoya, at which he presented a presentation on the topic "Indigenous peoples and protected areas in the Altai Republic". In this work, Sergey Nikolaevich noted the great role of the experience of the Altai Biosphere Reserve on cooperation between indigenous communities and the local population. The main topic of discussion was the issue of indigenous peoples' access to genetic resources and benefit-sharing. This protocol is being discussed by the UN within the framework of the Convention on Biological Diversity. The final decisions of the Conference were devoted to many important issues, for example, the further development of specially protected natural areas.

In May 2012, Sergey Ochurdyapov took part in the fifth Nevsky International Ecological Congress "Ecological basis of Sustainable Development", which was held in Saint Petersburg in Tauride Palace. He took part in the round table "Environmental Policy and Civil society".

In April 2014, Sergey Ochurdyapov took part in the Siberian Forum of National Cultural Associations "Dialogue of Cultures", held in the city of Ulan-Ude.

In December 2014, the delegation of the Altai Republic, which included Sergey Nikolaevich, took part in the III St. Petersburg International Cultural Forum. This forum is of great importance for the development of culture and the establishment of new contacts between subjects of Russia.

In November 2018, Sergey Ochurdyapov, as part of a delegation from the Altai Republic, took part in the work of the professional stream of the VII International Cultural Forum held in St. Petersburg. This time they considered culture "as a strategic potential of the country".

On September 7, 2022, an interregional seminar-meeting "Sacred territories: the experience of studying and preserving" was held in Yakutske. Sergey Ochurdyapov took part in this event. Also, an interview with Sergey Nikolaevich and the head of the Department of Sakha for the Protection of Cultural Heritage Objects Nikolai Makarov aired on Yakutia 24.

=== Anokhin National Museum ===
On October 24, 2012, Sergey Ochurdyapov was appointed director of the Anokhin Museum. Residents of the Altai Republic often raise the issue of the burial of Siberian Ice Maiden, which is currently stored in the Anokhin Museum. Sergey Ochurdyapov, holding the position of director of this institution, in an interview for a special report of the channel Russia-24 said that such statements are a way of campaigning before various elections in the republic. He also said that the museum would not go against the wishes of the population, but this issue should be resolved through the Ministry of Culture of Russia
