= Ochurdyap Mangdaev =

Political figure

Zaisan of the Second Chui Volost
- Reign: 1878-1897
- Predecessor: Mangday Chychkanov
- Successor: Kudaibergen Ochurdyapov
- Issue: Kudaibergen Ochurdyapov
- House: Ak-Kebek
- Father: Mangday Chychkanov
- Mother: Princess Chychkanova

Prince Ochurdyap Mangdaev (Altay: Очурjап, Russian: Очурдяп-Николай Мангдаев) r. 1878–1897 was the Zaisan of the Second Chui Volost. He took an active part in problematic issues of land management, while preserving the territory of the original residence of the indigenous population. Under his rule, Kosh-Agach became the center of trade routes in the Altai Mountains.

== Buddhism ==
Ochurdyap studied medicine with Mongolian lamas, and he also studied Buddhist ethics. In 1885, Ochurdyap created a yurt-shrine, where a prayer service was held on June 12 in the concelebration of six lamas. After the prayer service, horse races with prizes were held. Buddhist lamas were preparing Ochurdyap to accept the title of "Kelin Lama" and for the position of abbot of the Chui shrine.

== Kara-Kebeks ==
During the "Uprising of 60 Heroes" many Tuvan families were ruined. Some of the families fled to Altai, namely to the limits of the Second Chui Volost. The Tuvan families were accepted by Ochurdyap and separated them into a separate clan of Kara-Kebeks.

== In culture ==
- On June 12, 2014, on the 150th anniversary of the signing of the Chuguchak Protocol, the Ochurdyapu stele was installed in Kokorya.
- One of the streets of the village Kokorya was renamed and is now called "Zaisan-Ochurdyap Street"
- On April 22, 2019, archery competitions were held in Kokorya, in honor of Prince Ochurdyap.
