= Belyashi (village) =

Belyashi Беляши
- Village
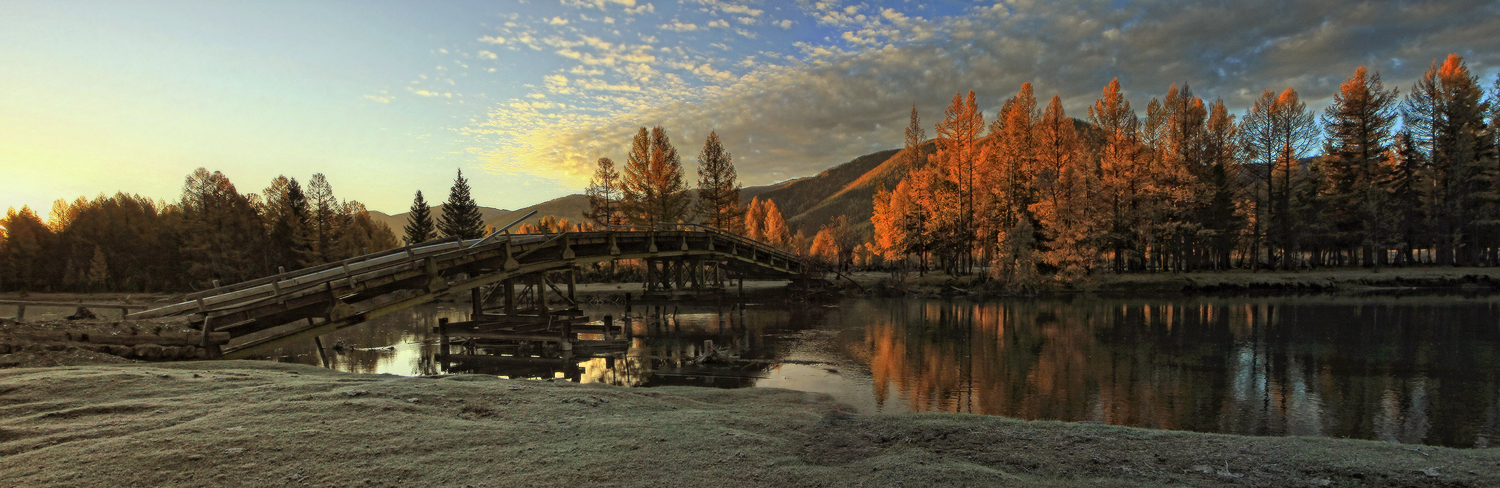
- Bridge over the Djazator river in Belyashi

- Location within Altai Republic Location within Russia
- Coordinates: 49°42′N 87°25′E
- Country: Russia
- Region: Altai Republic
- District: Kosh-Agachsky District
- Time zone: UTC+7:00

Belyashi (Russian: Беляши; Altay: Бел-Ажу, Bel-Aju) is a rural locality (a selo) and the administrative centre of Dzhazatorskoye Rural Settlement of Kosh-Agachsky District, the Altai Republic, Russia. The population was 1292 as of 2016. There are 9 streets.

== Geography ==
Belyashi is located in the valley of the Jazator River, surrounding the spurs of the South Chuy Ridge. The rivers Jazator and Akalahi (or Argut) merge near the village, 139 km southwest of Kosh-Agach (the district's administrative centre) by road. Novy Beltir is the nearest rural locality.

== Ethnicity ==
The village is inhabited by Kazakhs, Telengits and Russians.
