= Yarynak =

Zaisan of the Second Chui Volost
- Reign: 1754-1798
- Predecessor: Prince Kebegesh
- Successor: Chebek
- Born: unknown
- Died: 1798; Qing Empire
- Issue: Chebek
- House: Ak-Kebek
- Father: Prince Kebegesh
- Mother: Princess Ditasai

Yarynak (Altay: Jарнак) was a Zaisan of the Second Chui Volost, as well as a Qing official of the third rank (since 1757) and a major in the Russian Empire (since 1763).

== Biography ==
Yarynak was the middle child in the family of Prince Kebegesh and Princess Ditasai. He was named after his grandfather Kayrakan-Yarynak, who was the prince of the Yenisei Kyrgyz at the end of the 17th century.

== Reign ==
In 1757, when the Third Oirat-Manchurian War was in full swing and the inhabitants of the Altai Mountains were involved in the conflict, the Qing government recognized the power of Zaisan Yarynak in the Second Chui Volost, and also demanded that people exclusively from the House of Ak-Kebek rule in this otok. Also, the Qianlong Emperor equated Yarynak with officials of the third rank in China

This partial subordination to China was a forced measure, since otherwise the residents of Chui were threatened with complete destruction or forced relocation. And already at the end of 1757, Qing tax collectors came to Yarynak's possessions. In 1758, Yarynak's subjects refused to pay taxes to China. For this, the foreman Tangian, who betrayed his people, and the Dzungarian Zaisan Bohol attacked the Chui Telengits, forcibly collected a tax from them, and took several Telengite families to China

In addition, Yarynak's subjects paid taxes to Russia, while also not accepting Russian citizenship. Russia has repeatedly offered to raise the tax, but the government of the Second Chui Volost, headed by Yarynak, refused to do so, agreeing to pay no more than 40 sable skins from all over

In 1763, Catherine II signed a decree according to which Altai Zaisans, including Yarynak, began to be considered majors in Russia.

== In the legends ==
There is a legend about how Prince Yarynak created divisions of the Kipchaks family. One day Yarynak was returning from Mongolia with his army. Crossing to the left bank of the Kobdo River, he arranged a three-day rest. During the break, Yarynak decided to arrange a big feast, at which, with the help of meat distribution, he had to divide, paying attention to the merits, the warriors into tribal units. Those who got the neck of the horse were called Yalchy-Kipchak, and those who were given meat from the horse's back – Ak-Kipchak. Those who were honored to receive the kyyma began to be called Kedenchi-Kipchak.

== In culture ==
- There is a monument to Yarynak in the Ala Kayyn area.
