= Arkyt, Altai Republic =

Arkyt Аркыт
- Selo
- Location within Altai Republic Location within Russia
- Coordinates: 49°51′N 87°03′E
- Country: Russia
- Region: Altai Republic
- District: Kosh-Agachsky District
- Time zone: UTC+7:00

Arkyt (Russian: Аркыт; Altay: Аркыт, Arkıt) is a rural locality (a selo) in Kosh-Agachsky District, the Altai Republic, Russia. The population was 62 as of 2016. There are 2 streets.

== Geography ==
Arkyt is located 141 km southwest of Kosh-Agach (the district's administrative centre) by road. Belyashi is the nearest rural locality.
