= Kuray =

Kuray Курай
- Village
- Location within Altai Republic Location within Russia
- Coordinates: 50°13′N 87°55′E
- Country: Russia
- Region: Altai Republic
- District: Kosh-Agachsky District
- Time zone: UTC+7:00

Kuray (Russian: Курай; Altay: Курай) is a rural locality (a selo) and the administrative centre of Kurayskoye Rural Settlement of Kosh-Agachsky District, the Altai Republic, Russia. The population was 427 as of 2016. There are 6 streets.

== Geography ==
Kuray is located 66 km northwest of Kosh-Agach (the district's administrative centre) by road. Kyzyl-Tash is the nearest rural locality.
