= Chagan-Uzun =

Chagan-Uzun Чаган-Узун
- Selo
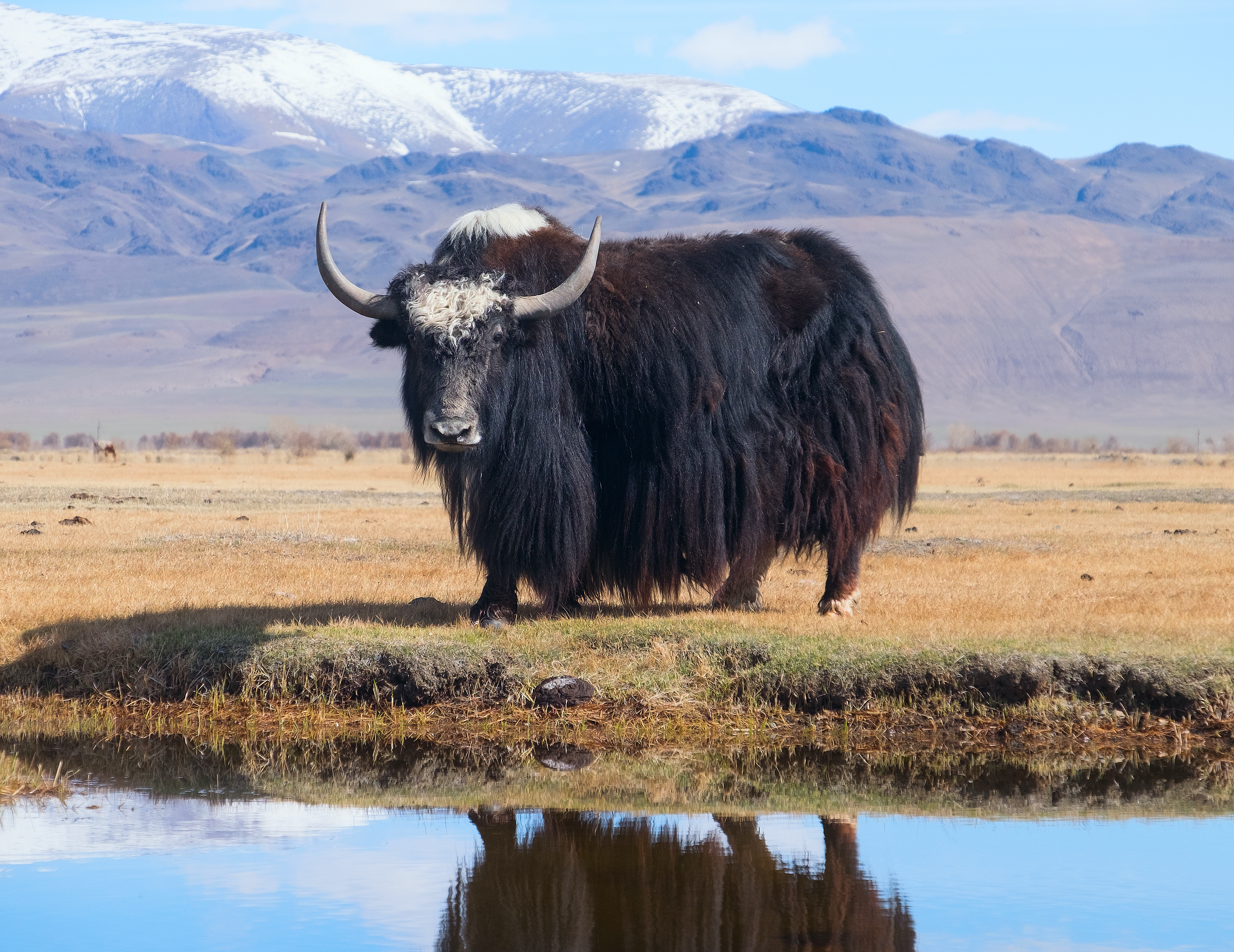
- A yak near Chagan-Uzun, Altai Republic, Russia

- Location in Russia Chagan-Uzun (Altai Republic)
- Coordinates: 50°06′N 88°21′E
- Country: Russia
- Region: Altai Republic
- District: Kosh-Agachsky District
- Time zone: UTC+7:00

Chagan-Uzun (Russian: Чаган-Узун; Altay: Чаган-Узун, Çagan-Uzun) is a rural locality (a selo) in Kosh-Agachsky District, the Altai Republic, Russia. The population was 439 as of 2016. There are 5 streets.

== Geography ==
Chagan-Uzun is located 29 km northwest of Kosh-Agach (the district's administrative centre) by road. Ortolyk is the nearest rural locality.
