= Arkyt =

Arkyt may refer to the following places:

- Arkyt, Altai Republic, a village in eastern Russia
- Arkyt, Kyrgyzstan, a village in western Kyrgyzstan
