= Baratal limestone =

Geologic formation in Russia

- Stratigraphic range: Ediacaran-Cambrian
- Type: Geologic formation
- Thickness: 8km

Lithology
- Primary: Limestone

Location
- Coordinates: 50°15′N 87°53′E
- Region: Siberia
- Country: Russia
- Baratal limestone (Russia)

Baratal limestone, also known as the Baratal Formation, is a limestone formation in the Altai Republic of Russia that formed during the Cambrian and Ediacaran, presumably on top of an ancient seamount that was later accreted to a continent. It may constitute the oldest known atoll in the world.

== Geography and geology ==
The formation crops out west and northwest of Chagan-Uzun in the Altai Republic, Russia, in particular around Kurai and Akkaya in the Kosh-Agach region. It is also known as the Baratal Formation.

The Baratal limestone of Cambrian age is the oldest known carbonate deposit on a seamount, akin to a present-day atoll. It formed a no more than 500 metres (1,600 ft) thick unit before tectonic processes thickened it to about 8 kilometres (5.0 mi). Rock units include limestone breccia/conglomerates, bedded limestone and ooid mudstones with 0.5 millimetres (0.020 in) ooids, and chert nodules. The limestone is associated with greenstone, which probably constitutes the volcanic basement that the Baratal limestone was emplaced upon. Parts of the unit may be buried by glacial deposits.

=== Interpretation ===
The limestone probably formed on a volcanic seamount or oceanic plateau in the open ocean, remote from any continental influence. The ooid mudstones may have developed in lagoonal environments like they are found on Great Bahama Bank, where photic zone waters were intensely agitated by tides and where the climate may have been hot and dry. Small sediment movements and large mass movement took place around the carbonate platforms, traces of this instability are found in the Baratal limestone which contains parts from both the original carbonate platform and debris from landslides off of it. The seamount was located in an ocean between the Siberian and Kazakhstan continents and is known as the Baratal or Kurai palaeoseamount.

The limestone is largely lacking in fossils but fossil stromatoliths have been recovered. They appear in the form of 40 centimetres (16 in) high and 40 centimetres (16 in) wide domes in numerous layers of the limestone, and probably grew in waters less than 50 metres (160 ft) deep. Unidentified fossils are found within the limestone and ooid units. Because of their relatively simple shapes they cannot be confidently identified, but they appear to be of Cambrian age and may be correlative with the Cambrian small shelly fauna and would indicate that it diversified not only in continental shelf areas but also in the open ocean. The stromatolites were probably constructed by microbial reefs that trapped sediments. Proper Cambrian fossils do not occur in the Baratal limestone.

=== Age ===
Lead-lead isotope dating has yielded an age of 598±25 million years, placing the limestone in the early Vendian/Ediacaran-Cambrian but the large margin of error and difficulty in reproducing the age make the estimate suspect. Strontium isotope ratios indicate that the basal limestone was emplaced immediately after the end of Snowball Earth, consistent with the lead-lead isotope dates.

The platform on which the Baratal limestone had formed would have eventually ended up in the Siberian trench due to plate tectonics and was amalgamated onto the Kuznetsk-Altai or Uimen-Lebed' island arc. Faulting also took place, and some faults in the region are active to this day. Groundwater flow through the limestone is leaching elements that later precipitate as tufas in the region.

== Geological context ==
The Baratal limestone is found within the 1,500 kilometres (930 mi) wide and 5,000 kilometres (3,100 mi) long Altai-Sayan orogenic belt which makes up the Gorny Altai Mountains. This orogenic belt formed from subduction processes lasting from the Neoproterozoic to the Paleozoic, including Cambrian units in the central Gorny Altai that include the Baratal limestone. Other rock formations in the area include Vendian-Cambrian accretionary complexes, Devonian volcanic rocks, metamorphic rocks and ophiolites. They are part of an accretionary complex called the Kurai accretionary complex.

The Ediacaran-Cambrian transition at the end of Snowball Earth featured a massive change in animal fauna, the so-called "Cambrian radiation". It is mostly known from ancient continental slope regions such as they are preserved in Canada's Burgess Shale and China's Maotianshan Shales while little is known of communities on the ocean floor. No ocean floor on Earth is older than 200 million years; all oceanic crust older than this has been subducted. Pieces of oceanic crust older than this - including sediments and volcanic rocks - however have been amalgamated to accretionary complexes in continents. Such outcrops, which allow the investigation of older seafloor, have been encountered in Japan (Paleozoic to Mesozoic) and Siberia (Cambrian).
