= Teleut language =

Endangered Kipchak Turkic language

Teleut
- Телеңет тили
- Native to: Russia
- Region: Kemerovo Oblast
- Ethnicity: Teleuts
- Native speakers: 1,570 (2020)
- Language family: Turkic: Common Turkic; Kipchak; Southern Altai; Teleut
- Dialects: ?Kalmak; Bachat; Tomsk
- Writing system: Cyrillic

Language codes
- ISO 639-3: –
- Glottolog: tele1258
- A map of the Altai languages, including Teleut (in pink).

Teleut is a moribund Turkic language spoken in the Altai Republic in Russia, spoken by Teleuts. It is sometimes considered a dialect of Southern Altai, but also as its own language. Since 2000, the Russian government has officially recognised it as a distinct language. It was the basis for the Altai literary language before 1917.

== Classification ==
The language is classed in the Kipchak languages by Novgorodov et al (2018). It is considered to be a dialect of Southern Altai, with the Telengit dialect or language and the literary form of Altai. The language had contacts with Ket and Ob Ugric languages.

== Phonology ==
Teleut has 8 vowels:

Teleut vowels
	Front	Back
High	i y	ɯ u
Low	e ø	a o

== Orthography ==
In the 1840s, missionaries devised various alphabets to write Teleut to create Church materials for the Teleuts.

A compilation of the orthographies is listed below:

Аа	Бб	Гг	Дд	Jj	Ее	Жж	Зз	Ii
Йй	Кк, К̅ к̅	Лл	Мм	Нн	Ҥҥ, Н̄ н̄	Oo	Ӧӧ	Пп
Рр	Сс	Тт	Уу	Ӱӱ	Чч	Шш	Ыы

The current orthography of Teleut is as follows:

А а	Б б	В в	Г г	Ғ ғ	Д д	Ј ј	Е е	Ё ё
Ж ж	З з	И и	Й й	К к	Қ қ	Л л	М м	Н н
Ң ң	О о	Ӧ ӧ	П п	Р р	С с	Т т	У у	Ӱ ӱ
Ф ф	Х х	Ц ц	Ч ч	Ш ш	Щ щ	ъ	ь	Ы ы
Э э	Ю ю	Я я

== Sources ==
- (ru) Баскаков, Н.A., Диалект чернёвых татар (туба-кижи), Северные диалекты алтаиского (ойротского) языка, 2 volumes, Moscou, Nauka, 1965-1966.

== See also ==
- Altai languages
