= Chuya Steppe =

Geologic formation in Siberia

- Depression
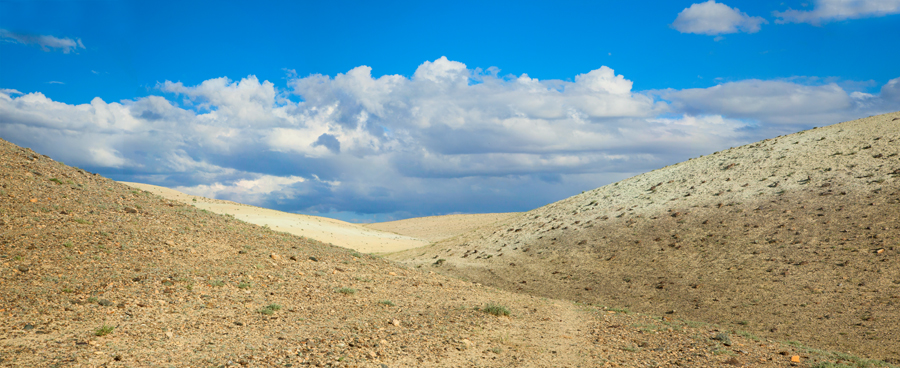
- Chuja steppe landscape

- Coordinates: 49°55′N 88°30′E

The Chuya Steppe (Russian: Чуйская степь) in the Siberian Altai Mountains is a depression formed by tectonic movement of major faults in the Earth's crust. Its name comes from the large river which runs through the steppe, the Chuya River.

== Major settlements ==
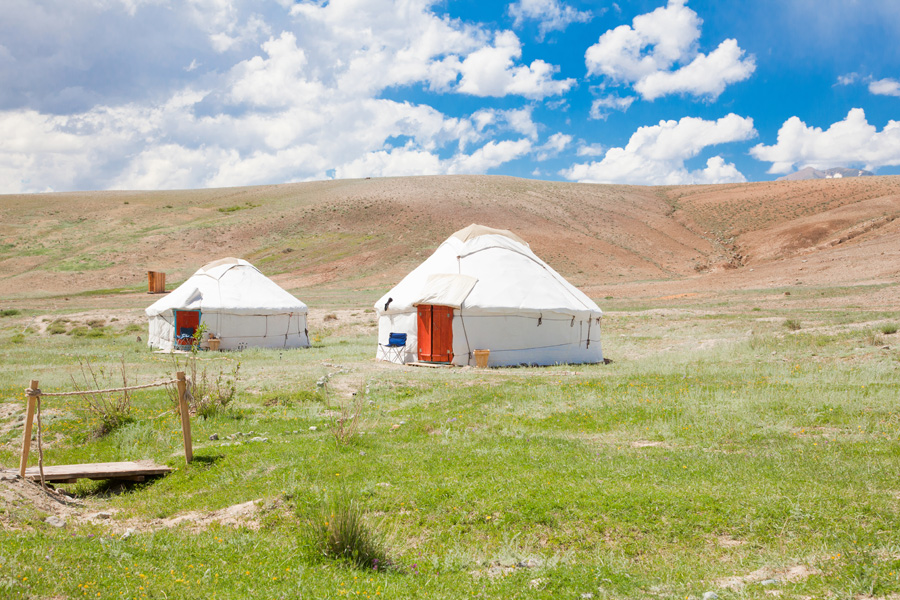
Yurts in the steppe

Kosh-Agach is a major village in the north of the steppe. Other large settlements include Chaganuzun and Beltir.

== Geology ==
The Chuya Steppe is filled with Cenozoic sediments, derived from the surrounding mountains of the Chuya Belki.

== Seismicity ==
The 7.3 M_{w} Altai earthquake shook South Central Siberia with a maximum Mercalli intensity of X (Extreme), causing $10.6–33 million in damage, three deaths, and five injuries.
