= Kokorya =

Kokorya Кокоря
- Village
- Location within Altai Republic Location within Russia
- Coordinates: 49°54′N 88°59′E
- Country: Russia
- Region: Altai Republic
- District: Kosh-Agachsky District
- Time zone: UTC+7:00

Kokorya (Russian: Кокоря; Altay: Кӧгӧрӱ, Kögörü) is a rural locality (a selo) and the administrative centre of Kokorinskoye Rural Settlement of Kosh-Agachsky District, the Altai Republic, Russia. The population is 941 as of 2016. There are 9 streets.

== Geography ==
Kokorya is located in the north-east of the Chui steppe, between the rivers Yustyd and Kyzylshin, 28 km southeast of Kosh-Agach (the district's administrative centre) by road. Zhana-Aul is the nearest rural locality.

== Ethnicity ==
The village is inhabited by Telengits and Altaians.
