= Telengit language =

Kipchak Turkic language

Telengit
- Телеҥит тил Teleñit til
- Native to: Russia
- Region: Altai Republic
- Ethnicity: 15,000 Telengits (2019–2024)
- Native speakers: c. 15,000 (2019–2024)
- Language family: Turkic: Common Turkic; Kipchak; Kyrgyz–Kipchak; Southern Altai; Telengit
- Dialects: Telengit-Teles; Chui
- Writing system: Cyrillic

Language codes
- ISO 639-3: –
- Glottolog: tala1279
- A map of the Altai languages, including Telengit (in orange).

Telengit is a Turkic language spoken in the Altai Republic in Russia by the Telengits. It is widespread in the Kosh-Agach and Ulagan districts of the Altai Republic.

The Telengit are also known as the Telengit-kiji or Chui-kiji.

== Classification ==
It is classified as a Kyrgyz-Kipchak. It is considered to be a dialect of the Southern Altai language, along with the Teleut and the literary varieties.

== Dialects ==
The Telengit language can be divided into two main dialects, the Telengit-Teles and Chui dialects.

The Telengit-Teles dialect can be subdivided in to the following subdialects:

- Balyktuyul
- Kara-Kudyur
- Chibilin
- Saratan-Yazulin
  - Saratan
  - Yuzulin
- Cholushman
- Chibit

The Chui dialect can be subdivided in to the following subdialects:

- Kosh-Agach
- Jazzator - This subdialect has a unique feature that is not typical of other dialects of the Altaic language: affixes with a wide rounded vowel [ӧ] occur after bases with a narrow rounded vowel [ӱ].

== Comparison with standard Altai ==
The Telengit language differs from the literary form of the Altai language in phonetics and morphology.

Instead of the initial [ш], [ч] is used. For example, Telengit чирдек (çirdek), Altay: ширдек 'felt carpet'. Also, in the roots of words, [ш] is used instead of [ч] (Teleñit тепчи (tepçi), Altay: тепши 'bowl').

The sounds [ф], [в], [ш], [ж], [щ], [ц] are not native Telengit and are found mainly in borrowings from the Russian language.

== Alphabet ==
An alphabet for the Ulagan dialect was proposed in 2016.

The alphabet of the Telengit language of the Teles (Ulagan) dialect proposed by N. D. Almadakova
а	б	ӷ	ғ	д	j	и	й	к	қ	л	м	н	ҥ	о	ӧ	ҧ	р	с	т	у	ӱ	ч	х	ш	ы	э	ӓ

But the alphabet used is similar to that used in the Altaic language.:

А а	Б б	В в	Г г	Д д	Ј ј	Е е
Ё ё	Ж ж	З з	И и	Й й	К к	Л л
М м	Н н	Ҥ ҥ	О о	Ӧ ӧ	П п	Р р
С с	Т т	У у	Ӱ ӱ	Ф ф	Х х	Ц ц
Ч ч	Ш ш	Щ щ	Ъ ъ	Ы ы	Ь ь	Э э

== Sources ==
- [Baskakov 1965-1966] (ru) Н.A. Баскаков (2 volumes), « Диалект чернёвых татар (туба-кижи) », dans Северные диалекты алтаиского (ойротского) языка, Moscou, Nauka, 1965–1966
- Алмадакова, Н. Д. (2016). Язык теленгитов: очерки по фонетике и морфологии в сопоставительном аспекте (in Russian). Горно-Алтайск. Almadakova2016.
- Алмадакова, Н. Д. (2017). "Система гласных фонем в тёлёсском (чолушманском) говоре улаганского диалекта теленгитского языка (в сопоставительном аспекте)". Полилингвиальность и транскультурные практики (in Russian). 14 (4): 556–570. doi:10.22363/2312-8011-2017-14-4-556-570. Almadakova2017a.
- [Almadakova 2017b] (ru) Н. Д. Алмадакова, « Фонетический строй диалектов алтайского языка и вопросы алфавита литературного алтайского языка », dans Актуальные вопросы современной филологии: теоретические проблемы и прикладные аспекты: Материалы международной научно-практической конференции. ІХ Багизбаевские чтения. ‒ Алматы, 28 апреля 2017, Алматы, Қазақ университеті, 2017 (ISBN 978-601-04-2350-3, lire en ligne), p. 37-40
- Алмадакова, Н. Д. (2018). "Долгий гласный [а] в именных словоформах тёлёсского говора улаганского диалекта теленгитского языка (в сопоставительном аспекте)" (PDF). Вестник НГУ. История, филология (in Russian). 17 (2): 99–114. doi:10.25205/1818-7919-2018-17-2-99-114.
- Тазранова, Алена (7 October 2021). "Теленгитский язык". ПостНаука (in Russian). Tazranova2021.
