= Southern Altai language =

Kipchak Turkic language

Southern Altai
- Oirot, Oyrot (before 1948), Altai-Kizhi
- тÿштÿк алтай тил, tüştük altay til ойрот тил (before 1948)
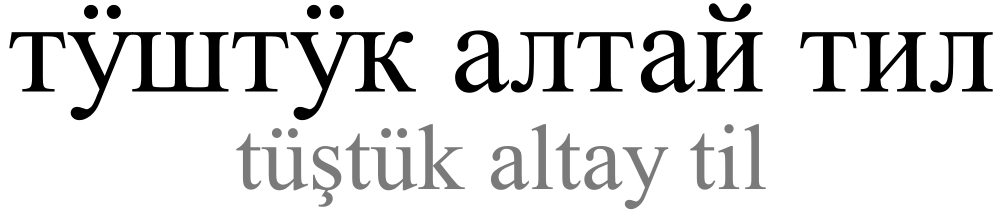
- Southern Altai written in Cyrillic and Latin scripts
- Native to: Russia
- Region: Altai Republic
- Ethnicity: Altai-Kizhi
- Native speakers: 68,700 (2020)
- Language family: Turkic: Common Turkic; Kipchak; Kyrgyz–Kipchak; Southern Altai
- Dialects: Southern Altai proper; Telengit; Teleut
- Writing system: Cyrillic

Language codes
- ISO 639-2: alt
- ISO 639-3: alt
- Glottolog: sout2694
- ELP: Southern Altai
- Southern Altai

- Southern Altay is classified as Definitely Endangered by the UNESCO Atlas of the World's Languages in Danger

Southern Altai (also known as Oirot, Oyrot, Altai and Altai proper) is a Turkic language spoken in the Altai Republic, a federal subject of Russia located in Southern Siberia on the border with Mongolia and China. The language has some mutual intelligibility with the Northern Altai language, leading to the two being traditionally considered as a single language. According to modern classifications—at least since the middle of the 20th century—they are considered to be two separate languages.

A man, named Dmitry, speaking Southern Altai.

Written Altai is based on Southern Altai. According to some reports, however, it is rejected by Northern Altai children. Dialects include Altai Proper and Talangit.

== Classification ==
Southern Altai is a member of the Turkic language family. Within this family, there have been various attempts to classify Altai, and not all of them agree as to its position as it has a number of ambiguous characteristics. Due to certain similarities with Kyrgyz, some scholars group Altai with the Kyrgyz–Kipchak subgroup of the Kipchak languages.

== Geographic distribution ==
Southern Altai is primarily spoken in the Altai Republic, where it has official status alongside Russian.

=== Dialects ===
Baskakov identifies three dialects of Southern Altai, some of which have distinctive sub-varieties:

- Altai
  - Maima (sub-variety)
- Telengit
  - Telengit-Teles
  - Chui
- Teleut

Some sources consider Telengit and Teleut to be distinct languages.

== Phonology ==
Southern Altai has 8 vowels, which may be long or short, and 20 consonants, plus marginal consonants that occur only in loan words.

=== Vowels ===
Southern Altai vowels
	Front	Back
High	i y	ɯ u
Low	e ø	a o

=== Consonants ===
Southern Altai consonants
	Labial	Alveolar	Post-alveolar	Velar	Uvular
Plosive	p b	t d	tʃ ɟ	k ɡ	q
Affricate		(ts)	tʃ ɟ		
Fricative	f v	s z	ʃ ʒ	(x) ɣ	
Nasal	m	n		ŋ	
Trill		r			
Approximant		l	j		

Phonemes in parentheses occur only in Russian loanwords.

== Writing system ==
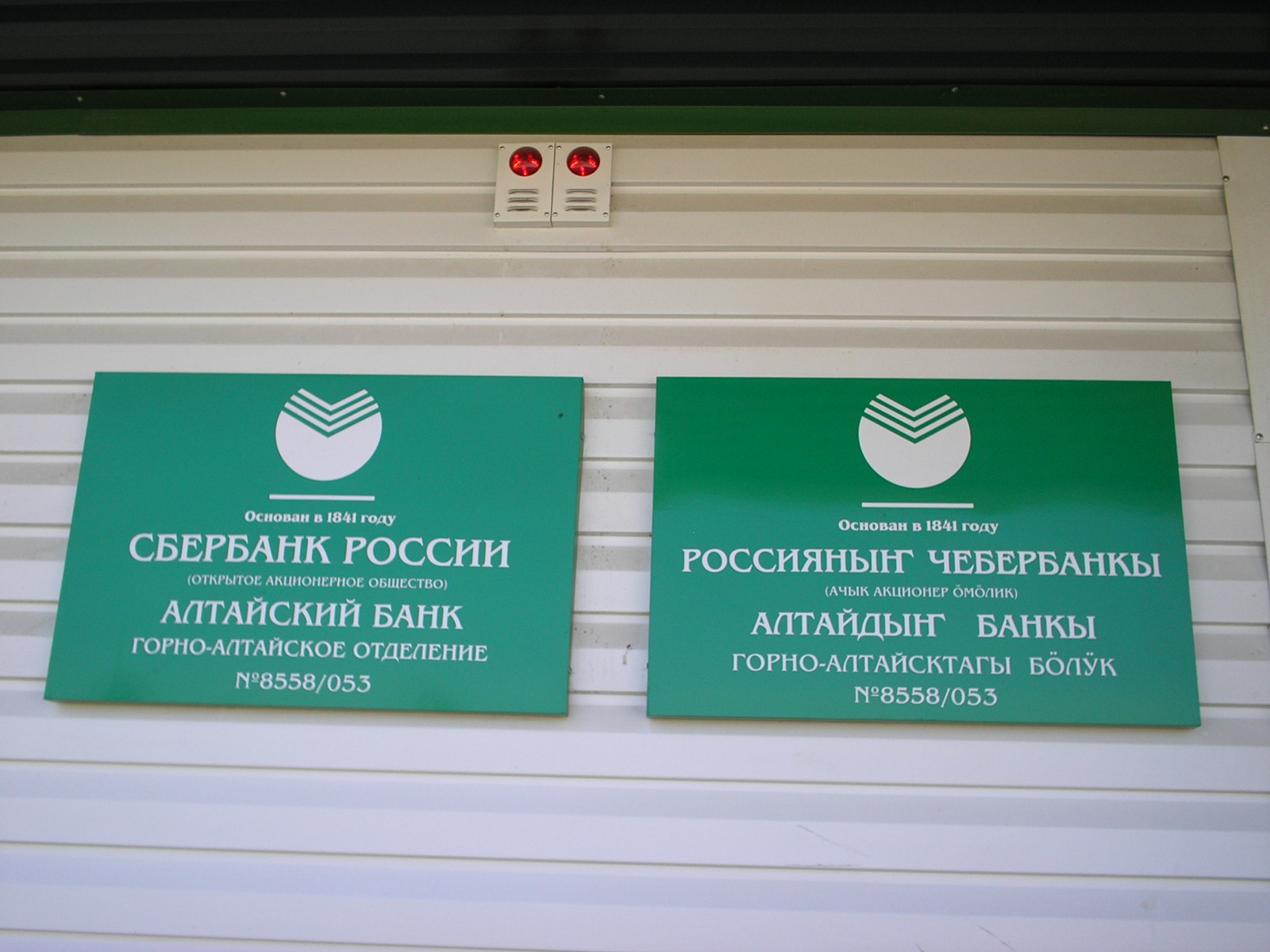
Signs at a Sberbank office in Ust-Koksa in Russian and Altai languages

Southern Altai employs a version of the Cyrillic alphabet with additional characters to represent sounds not found in Russian.

А а	Б б	В в	Г г	Д д	Ј ј	Е е
Ё ё	Ж ж	З з	И и	Й й	К к	Л л
М м	Н н	Ҥ ҥ	О о	Ӧ ӧ	П п	Р р
С с	Т т	У у	Ӱ ӱ	Ф ф	Х х	Ц ц
Ч ч	Ш ш	Щ щ	Ъ ъ	Ы ы	Ь ь	Э э
