= Otok (administrative unit) =

Administrative unit

Otok (or Otog, Mongolian: отог) is a feudal inheritance in medieval Mongolia. In feudal dependence on otok there were people from various clans connected by the unity of the territory.

== Description ==
"Otok" is a translation of the Mongolian "otog" (ᠣᠲᠣᠭ), which means "camp" or "department" in Mongolian. Soviet scientists have confirmed that this word originally came from the Sogdian "otak", which originally meant "land" and "region". The researcher of Inner Mongolia Hu Alateng Ula believes that this word, including the Sogdian "otak", comes from the Hunnic "Ou Tu", which was originally the first level of the organization of the social management of the Xiongnu

Shagdarzhavyn Natsagdorzh assumed that the "otok" of the Mongols appeared a long time ago. For example, during the reign of Kublai Khan, the otok already existed, and they included about 10,000 villages. It is important to understand that the otok is not a union of blood relatives, but the people who were at the head were not tribal elders. Otok was only a nomadic fief. In some cases, otok was like a principality.

In the Manchurian period, the Otoks were replaced by the Hoshuns. In the XVIII and XIX centuries, the Telengits had only two otoks, which had limited sovereignty. These Otoks had zaisans in power. Later these lands became part of Russia and became known as volosts. An administrative unit of self-government among the Altaians, similar to the concept of "volost", during the transition from Dzungarian influence to Russian citizenship.
