= Ka with macron =

Cyrillic letter

- К̄ к̄

Usage
- Writing system: Cyrillic
- Type: Alphabetic
- Language of origin: Altai language

Ka with macron (К̄ к̄) is a letter of the Cyrillic script. It was formerly used in the first alphabet for the Altai language.
