= Zaisan (title) =

Ancient title of Chinese origin

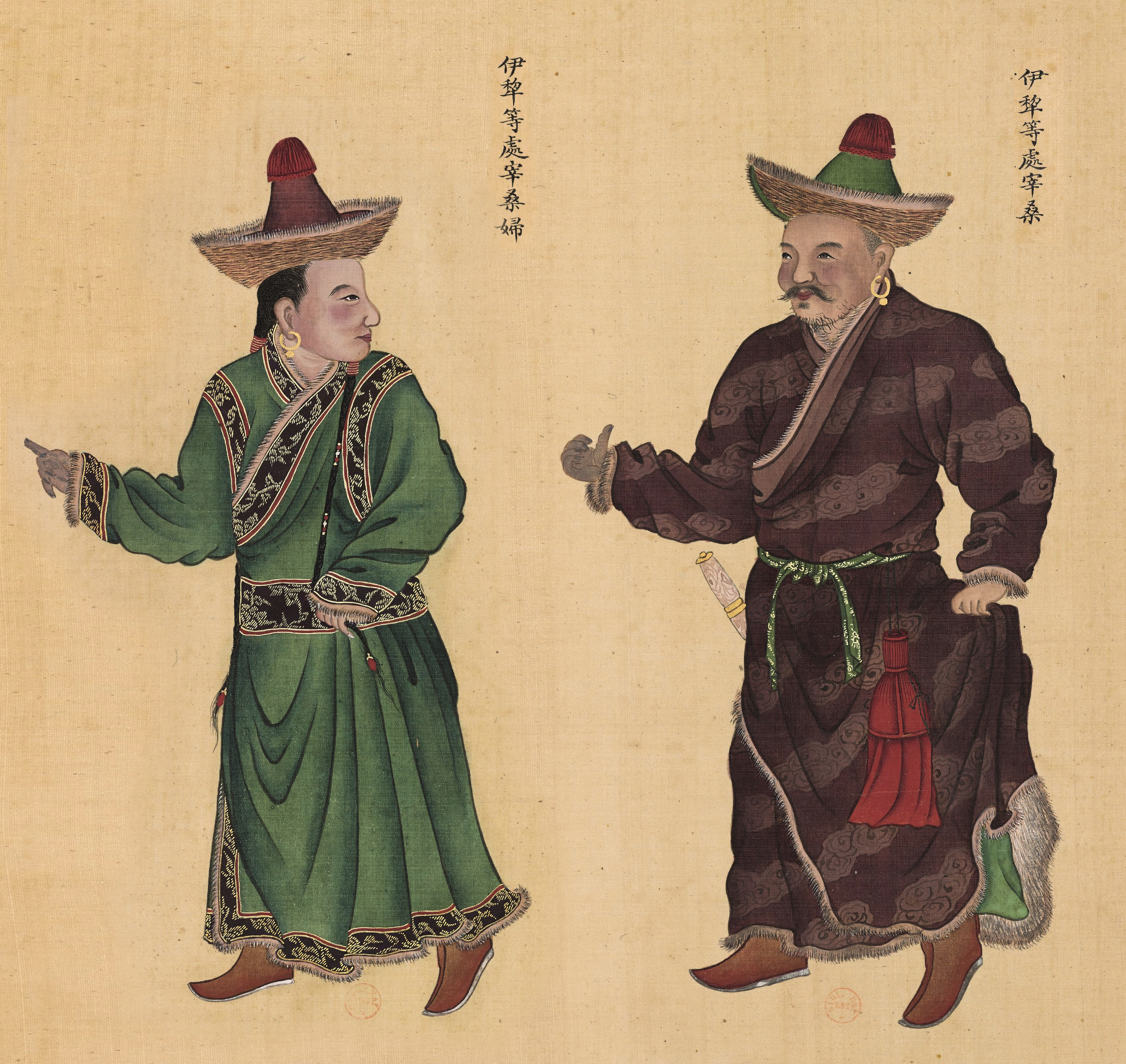
Zaisan Huang Qing Zhigong Tu and his wife, 1769

Zaisan (Mongolian: Зайсан) is an ancient title among the Mongols, Buryats, Kalmyks, Altaians, Khakas, Telengits, denoting the hereditary ruler of the otok, ulus or aimag. In some cases, the title corresponded to the prince.

== Etymology ==
The word "zaisan" comes from the name of the Chinese title "zaixiang", which served as chancellor.

== The title of zaisan among Telengits ==
In the XVIII and XIX centuries, the title of the ruler of the Teles and Kebeks Otoks, which corresponded to prince. Zaisan's power was almost limitless, even after joining the Russian Empire. The power of zaisan was higher than the power of the volost foreman. Zaisans in their volosts had the right to punish any Telengite without a trial

== The title of zaisan among Buryats ==
Zaisan (Buryat: Zaihan) is a junior administrative rank in pre—revolutionary Buryatia. Zaisans were at the head of the otok, sometimes the ulus as hereditary possessions.
