= Telengits =

Turkic ethnic/subethnic group living in the Siberian Altai Republic

Телеҥеттер
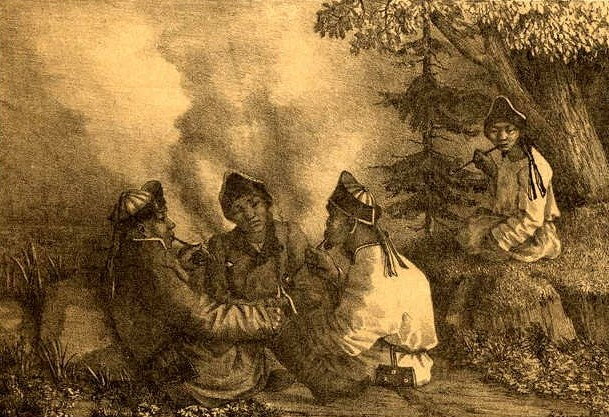
- Pavel Mikhailovich Kosharov - "Telengits", 1889

Regions with significant populations
- Russia: 3,712

Languages
- Southern Altai (Telengit), Russian

Religion
- Tengrism, Russian Orthodox, Burkhanism

Related ethnic groups
- Teleuts, Altai-Kizhi, Siberian Tatars, Kyrgyz

Telengits or Telengut (Altay: Телеҥеттер) are a Turkic ethnic group native to Central Asia that are recognized as one of the minor indigenous peoples of Russia. They mainly live in the Kosh-Agachsky District of the federal Altai Republic. They are an ethnic subgroup of the Altaians.

== History ==
Chinese chroniclers might have mentioned Telengits as Middle Chinese: *tâ-lâm-kât, 多覽葛 (Standard Mandarin Chinese: duōlǎngé). During Dzungar domination, the Telengits had to pay a fur tribute or yasak to the Dzungars.

The Telengits in the 14th century created their own principality (the Ulus or Orda). This principality was known in Russian documents of the 16th−18th century as the Teleut land (Russian: Телеутская Землица; Teleutskaya zemlyatsa) and is termed by modern historians the "Telengit Ulus". The Telengit princes, titled Biy, for a long time retained independence, and later had only a formal dependence between the states (Russia and the Dzungar Khanate); Telengits even inflicted defeats on both, until they were finally conquered by the Dzungar Khanate in the 18th century. They then became part of the khanate, as an ulus of four thousand yurts. The Telengits, whom the Khuntaiji had resettled on the Ili River, when the turmoil in the Dzungar Khanate began, took the opportunity to return to their homeland and tried to get to the Altai. Many people were lost along the way due to the raids of the Manchurians, Kazakhs, and Khalkha Mongols

At the beginning of the 18th century, the Telengits formed two volosts, which became part of Russia much later, unlike other Altains, who came under Russian rule in 1756. On October 10, 1864, the First Chui Volost became part of the Russian Empire, and only on January 12, 1865, the inhabitants of the Second Chui Volost became citizens of Russia.

== Ethnicity in the Altai ==
There are many groups that live in the Altai region, with the territorial groupings being somewhat fluid. For these reasons it may be difficult to distinguish between them. Telengits (or Telengut) live along the Chuya River in the western Altai and call themselves Chui-kizhi (Chuya people). Sometimes they intermix with other groups that live around the river. With this intermixing, it is often difficult to establish boundaries and distinguish the individual groups. There are no sharp distinctions among the different subgroups of the Altaians, identified as they are by the territory they occupy. This inevitably caused many problems, including how to ethnically classify them. It was the political leaders of the Ulagan district who first advocated that the Telengits be recognized as a separate Indigenous group in Russian law. Before this, there was often confusion because the Telengits were classified under the Altaians. Even after the Telengits were classified as a separate group, there were still discrepancies as to what subgroups would be included under the ethnic group of the Telengits.

In 2000, Telengits were listed as part of "Small Numbered Indigenous Peoples of the Russian Federation on the Russian and Soviet censuses".

In 2002, they were considered their own category on the census and there were 2,398 Telengits. However, this number may be inaccurate because in the context of the census questions, many Telengits, 8,000 or 9,000 would consider themselves Altaians and not Telengits.

In 2004, the NGO "Development of the Telengit People" was established. This group is an active part in the local political area in regard to issues of Telengit land rights.

== Culture ==
Most Telengits were historically nomadic or semi-nomadic cattle herders. They commonly raised sheep, cattle, goats, and horses.

Traditional Telengit dwellings included felt yurts. Modern Telengits live in wooden homes but commonly inhabit yurts during the summer months. Traditional dress was similar for both men and women. The dress was composed of long-sleeved shirts, breeches, and robes. Double-breasted sheepskin coats, fur hats, and high boots were also commonly worn. Married women additionally wore a sleeveless jacket over their coats.

=== Religion ===
Most Telengits practice shamanism and Eastern Orthodox Christianity. Smaller numbers practice Burkhanism. Shamanism continues to exert a strong influence in Telengit culture while Orthodoxy has seen a recent revival among the Telengits.

=== Connection to the land ===
The Altaians and the Telengits feel a connection to the land that they live on. They are supposed to worship their special homeland that is considered sacred. Telengits say that if an Altaian leaves the Altai, he or she will become ill and die, not because of any longing or emotional distress, but because of physical separation. After they have lived on the land, they become one with it. That is why it is so severe when one is separated from their homeland.

== See also ==
- Altay language
- Altai people
- Teleuts
- Turkic peoples
