= Seok (clan) =

Siberian Turkic term for "clan"

Seok (IPA: [søːk], from a Siberian Turkic word meaning 'bone', e.g. Altay: сööк, Kyrgyz and Tuvan сөөк) is an international term for a clan used in Eurasia from Central Asia to the Far East. Seok is usually a distinct member of the community; the name implies that its size is smaller than that of a distinct tribe. It is a term for a clan among the Turkic-speaking people in Siberia, Central Asia, and the Far East.

The term "Seok" designates a distinct ethnical, geographical, or occupational group distinguishable within a community, usually an extract from a separate distinct tribe. Smaller seoks tend to intermarry and dissolve after a few centuries, or a couple of dozens generations, gaining new ethnic names, but still carrying some elements and proscriptions of their parent seok, like the incest restrictions. Larger seoks tend to survive for millennia, carrying their tribal identification and a system of blood and political alliances and enmities. In the Turkic societies, the integrity and longevity of the seoks was based on the blood relations, fed by a permanent alliance of conjugal tribes. After a separation with a conjugal partner caused by a forced migration, which amounts to a communal divorce, a seok would seek and establish a new permanent conjugal partnership, eventually obtaining new cultural, genetical, and linguistical traits, which in ethnological terms constitutes a transition to a new ethnicity.
