= Kosh-Agach =

Kosh-Agach Кош-Агач
- Selo

Other transcription(s)
  - Altai: Кӧжӧӧ-Агаш
  - Kazakh: Қосағаш
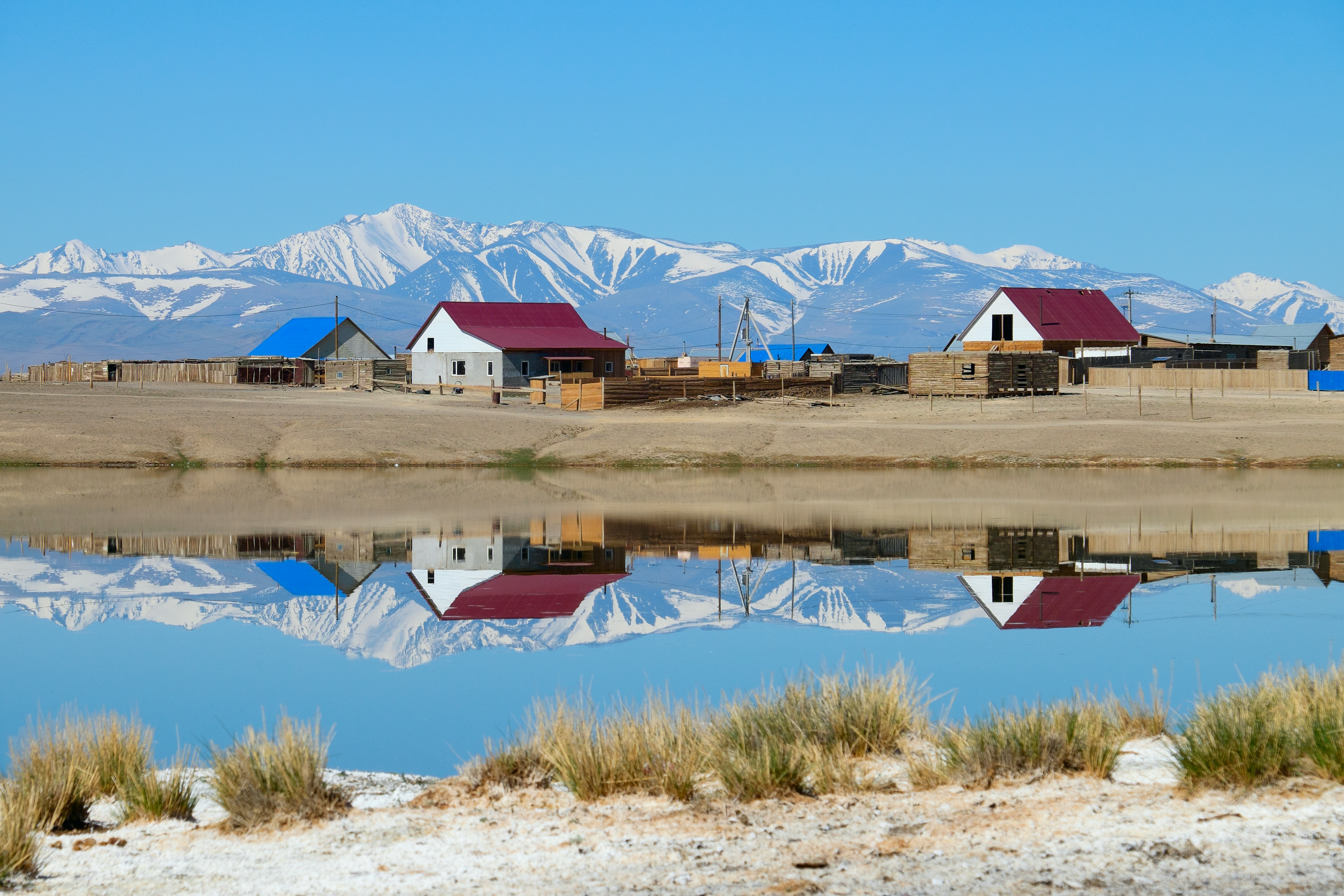
- View of the Yuzhno-Chuysky ridge

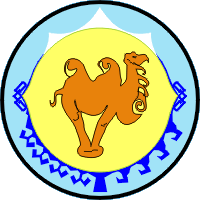
- Coat of arms
- Interactive map of Kosh-Agach
- Location of Kosh-Agach Kosh-Agach (Altai Republic)
- Coordinates: 49°59′42″N 88°40′02″E
- Country: Russia
- Federal subject: Altai Republic
- Administrative district: Kosh-Agachsky District
- SelsovietSelsoviet: Kosh-Agachsky
- Founded: 1801
- Elevation: 1,758 m (5,768 ft)

Population (2010 Census)
  - Total: 7,900
  - Estimate (2021): 8,334 (+5.5%)

Administrative status
  - Capital of: Kosh-Agachsky District, Kosh-Agachsky Selsoviet

Municipal status
  - Municipal district: Kosh-Agachsky Municipal District
  - Rural settlement: Kosh-Agachskoye Rural Settlement
  - Capital of: Kosh-Agachsky Municipal District, Kosh-Agachskoye Rural Settlement
- Time zone: UTC+6 (MSK+3)
- Postal code: 649780
- OKTMO ID: 84610430101

Kosh-Agach (Russian: Кош-Ага́ч; Altay: Кӧжӧӧ-Агаш, Koş-Agaş; Kazakh: Қосағаш, Qosağaş) is a rural locality (a selo) and the administrative center of Kosh-Agachsky District of the Altai Republic, Russia. Population: 7,900 (2010 census); 5,701 (2002 census); 3,501 (1989 Soviet census).

== Geography ==
=== Climate ===
According to the Köppen Climate Classification, Kosh-Agach has a subarctic climate (Dwc), bordering upon a cold arid climate (BWk). The village experiences short, mild summers and long, frigid and extremely dry winters. It is one of the driest places in Russia with annual precipitation just 124 millimetres or 4.88 inches, and just 39 millimetres or 1.54 inches from September to May.

Climate data for Kosh-Agach
| Month | Jan | Feb | Mar | Apr | May | Jun | Jul | Aug | Sep | Oct | Nov | Dec | Year |
|---|---|---|---|---|---|---|---|---|---|---|---|---|---|
| Record high °C (°F) | 1.5 (34.7) | 4.3 (39.7) | 14.9 (58.8) | 24.9 (76.8) | 28.2 (82.8) | 30.6 (87.1) | 33.2 (91.8) | 31.2 (88.2) | 27.3 (81.1) | 19.4 (66.9) | 8.9 (48.0) | 2.9 (37.2) | 33.2 (91.8) |
| Mean daily maximum °C (°F) | −20.6 (−5.1) | −14.6 (5.7) | −2.9 (26.8) | 8.2 (46.8) | 14.6 (58.3) | 20.7 (69.3) | 22.4 (72.3) | 20.4 (68.7) | 14.1 (57.4) | 4.9 (40.8) | −8.2 (17.2) | −17.8 (0.0) | 3.4 (38.2) |
| Daily mean °C (°F) | −27.3 (−17.1) | −22.6 (−8.7) | −10.5 (13.1) | 1.0 (33.8) | 7.4 (45.3) | 13.5 (56.3) | 15.3 (59.5) | 13.1 (55.6) | 6.6 (43.9) | −2.2 (28.0) | −14.7 (5.5) | −24.0 (−11.2) | −3.7 (25.3) |
| Mean daily minimum °C (°F) | −32.1 (−25.8) | −28.5 (−19.3) | −17.0 (1.4) | −5.3 (22.5) | 0.6 (33.1) | 6.7 (44.1) | 9.1 (48.4) | 6.4 (43.5) | −0.4 (31.3) | −8.3 (17.1) | −19.8 (−3.6) | −28.5 (−19.3) | −9.8 (14.5) |
| Record low °C (°F) | −55.1 (−67.2) | −50.9 (−59.6) | −47.9 (−54.2) | −34.0 (−29.2) | −13.8 (7.2) | −6.5 (20.3) | −2.2 (28.0) | −6.2 (20.8) | −23.9 (−11.0) | −32.3 (−26.1) | −46.7 (−52.1) | −51.2 (−60.2) | −55.1 (−67.2) |
| Average precipitation mm (inches) | 3 (0.1) | 1 (0.0) | 1 (0.0) | 4 (0.2) | 9 (0.4) | 22 (0.9) | 35 (1.4) | 28 (1.1) | 7 (0.3) | 5 (0.2) | 6 (0.2) | 3 (0.1) | 124 (4.9) |
Source: www.pogodaiklimat.ru

== Geology ==
The Baratal limestone, potentially the oldest atoll in the world, was found here.
