= Kosh-Agachsky District =

Kosh-Agachsky District Кош-Агачский район (Russian)
- District

Other transcription(s)
  - Altay: Кош-Агаш аймак, Кӧжӧӧ-Агаш аймак
  - Kazakh: Қосағаш ауданы
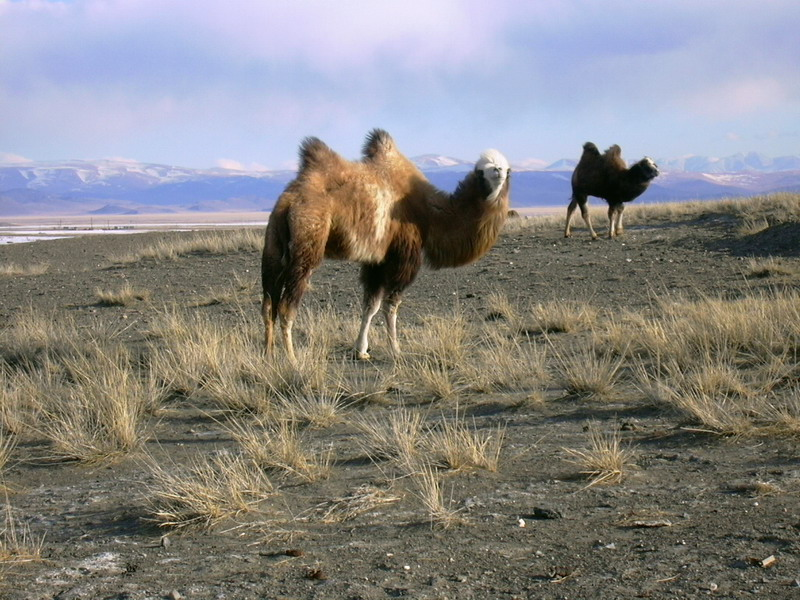
- Camels in the Chuya Steppe, Kosh-Agachsky District

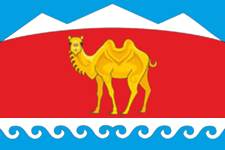
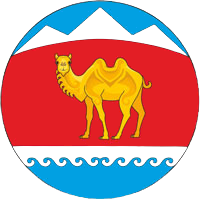
- Flag Coat of arms
- Location of Kosh-Agachsky District in the Altai Republic
- Coordinates: 50°00′N 88°41′E
- Country: Russia
- Federal subject: Altai Republic
- Established: 1922
- Administrative center: Kosh-Agach

Area
  - Total: 19,845 km^{2} (7,662 sq mi)

Population (2010 Census)
  - Total: 18,263
  - Density: 0.92028/km^{2} (2.3835/sq mi)
  - Urban: 0%
  - Rural: 100%

Administrative structure
  - Administrative divisions: 12 Rural settlements
  - Inhabited localities: 16 rural localities

Municipal structure
  - Municipally incorporated as: Kosh-Agachsky Municipal District
  - Municipal divisions: 0 urban settlements, 12 rural settlements
- Time zone: UTC+6 (MSK+3)
- OKTMO ID: 84610000
- Website: http://www.mokoshagach.ru/?id=31

Population of Kosh-Agachsky District
- 2010 Census: 18,263
- 2002 Census: 17,353
- 1989 Census: 16,426
- 1979 Census: 14,246

Kosh-Agachsky District (Russian: Кош-Ага́чский райо́н, romanized: Kosh-Agachskij raion; Altay: Кош-Агаш аймак, Кӧжӧӧ-Агаш аймак, romanized: Qoş-Ağaş aymaq, Köjöö-Ağaş aymaq; Kazakh: Қосағаш ауданы, romanized: Qosağaş audany) is an administrative and municipal district (raion), one of the ten in the Altai Republic, Russia. It is located in the south and southeast of the republic. The area of the district is 19,845 square kilometers (7,662 sq mi). Its administrative center is the rural locality (a selo) of Kosh-Agach. As of the 2010 Census, the total population of the district was 18,263, with the population of Kosh-Agach accounting for 43.3% of that number.

== Administrative and municipal status ==
Within the framework of administrative divisions, Kosh-Agachsky District is one of the ten in the Altai Republic. As a municipal division, the district is incorporated as Kosh-Agachsky Municipal District. Both administrative and municipal districts are divided into the same twelve rural settlements, comprising sixteen rural localities. The selo of Kosh-Agach serves as the administrative center of both the administrative and municipal district.

== Population ==
Ethnic composition (2010):

- Kazakhs – 53.4%
- Altay – 40.5%
- Russians – 3.2%
- Others – 2.9%
