= Altai languages =

Grouping of two Turkic languages

Altai
- Gorno–Altai
- (ethnically defined)
- Geographic distribution: Altai Republic, Altai Krai, Kemerovo Oblast
- Ethnicity: Altai, including Chelkans, Telengits, Tubalars
- Native speakers: 125,700 (Total of Southern and Northern Altai speakers)
- Linguistic classification: Turkic: Common Turkic; Siberian Turkic and Kipchak; Southern Siberian and Kyrgyz–Kipchak; Altai
- Subdivisions: Northern Altai; Southern Altai

Language codes
- ISO 639-2 / 5: alt
- Glottolog: None alta1276 code retired
- Map of Altai varieties

Altai or Altay (Altay: Алтай тил, romanized: Altay til, IPA: [ɐɫtʰɐ́ɪ̯ tʰɪ̆l]) is a set of Turkic languages spoken officially in the Altai Republic, Russia. The standard vocabulary is based on the Southern Altai language, though it is also taught to and used by speakers of the Northern Altai language as well. Gorno–Altai refers to a subgroup of languages in the Altai Mountains. The languages were called Oyrot (ойрот) prior to 1948.

Altai is spoken primarily in the Altai Republic. A small community of speakers lives in the neighbouring Altai Krai as well.

== Classification ==
Due to its isolated position in the Altai Mountains and contact with surrounding languages, the exact classification of Altai within the Turkic languages has often been disputed. Because of its geographic proximity to the Shor and Khakas languages, some classifications place it in a Northern Turkic subgroup. Due to certain similarities with Kyrgyz, it has been grouped as the Kyrgyz–Kipchak subgroup with the Kypchak languages which is within the Turkic language family. A classification by Talat Tekin places Southern Altai in its own subgroup within Turkic and groups the Northern Altai dialects with Lower Chulym and the Kondoma dialect of Shor.

=== Varieties ===
Though they are traditionally considered one language, Southern Altai is not fully mutually intelligible with the Northern varieties. According to modern classifications—at least since the middle of the 20th century—they are considered to be two separate languages.

Written Altai is based on Southern Altai, and according to Ethnologue is rejected by Northern Altai children. In 2006, a Cyrillic alphabet was created for the Kumandy variety of Northern Altai for use in Altai Krai.

Dmitry speaking Southern Altai.

Dialects are as follows:

- Southern Altai
  - Altai proper
    - Mayma
  - Telengit
    - Tölös
    - Chuy
  - Teleut
- Northern Altai
  - Tuba
  - Kumandy
    - Turachak
    - Solton
    - Starobardinian
  - Chalkan (also called Kuu, Lebedin)

Closely related to the northern varieties are Kondoma Shor and Lower Chulym, which have -j- for proto-Turkic inter-vocalic *d, unlike Mras Shor and Middle Chulym, which have -z- and are closer to Khakas.

== Official status ==
Altai is an official language of the Altai Republic, alongside Russian. The official Altai language is based on the Southern Altai language spoken by the group called the Altay-Kiži, however in the few years it has also spread to the Northern Altai Republic.

== Linguistic features ==
The following features refer to the outcome of commonly used Turkic isoglosses in Northern Altai.

- */ag/ — Proto-Turkic */ag/ is found in three variations throughout Northern Altai: /u/, /aw/, /aʁ/.
- */eb/ — Proto-Turkic */eb/ is found as either /yj/ or /yg/, depending on the variety.
- */VdV/ — With a few lexical exceptions (likely borrowings), proto-Turkic intervocalic */d/ results in /j/.

== Phonology ==
The sounds of the Altai language vary among different dialects.

=== Consonants ===
Consonant phonemes of Altai
	Labial		Alveolar		Palato- alveolar		Palatal		Velar	
Nasal		m		n						ŋ
Plosive	p	b	t	d			c	ɟ	k	ɡ
Affricate					tʃ	dʒ				
Fricative			s	z	ʃ	ʒ			x	ɣ
Approximant				l				j		
Rhotic				ɾ~r						

The voiced palatal plosive /ɟ/ varies greatly from dialect to dialect, especially in the initial position, and may be recognized as a voiced affricate /d͡z/. Forms of the word јок "no" include [coq] (Kuu dialect) and [joq] (Kumandy). Even within dialects, this phoneme varies greatly.

=== Vowels ===
Altai has eight vowels, which may be long or short.

Vowel phonemes of Altai
		Front		Back	
		short	long	short	long
Close	unrounded	i	iː	ɯ	ɯː
Close	rounded	y	yː	u	uː
Open	unrounded	e	eː	a	aː
Open	rounded	ø	øː	o	oː

== Orthography ==
The language was written with the Latin script from 1928 to 1938, but has used Cyrillic (with the addition of 9 extra letters: Јј [d͡z~ɟ], Ҥҥ [ŋ], Ӧӧ [ø~œ], Ӱӱ [y~ʏ], Ғғ [ʁ], Ққ [q], Һһ [h], Ҷҷ [d͡ʑ], Ii [ɪ]) since 1938.

The letter Ÿ is sometimes used instead of Ӱ.

=== Missionary's Cyrillic alphabet ===
The first writing system for Altai was invented by missionaries from the Altai Spiritual Mission in the 1840s; it was based on the Cyrillic alphabet and invented for the Teleut dialect, and was used mostly for Church publications. The first books were printed in Altai not long thereafter and in 1868, the first Altai alphabet was published. There was no stable form of this alphabet, and it changed from edition to edition.

With this in mind, this is an inventory of some of these letters:

Аа	Бб	Гг	Дд	Jj	Ее	Жж	Зз
Ii	Йй	Кк	К̄к̄	Лл	Мм	Нн	Ҥҥ
Н̄н̄	Oo	Ӧӧ	Пп	Рр	Сс	Тт	Уу
Ӱӱ	Чч	Шш	Ыы

=== First Cyrillic alphabet (1922–1928) ===
After the Bolshevik Revolution in 1917, publishing books into Altai was resumed in 1921, using a script similar to the Missionary's Alphabet. About this time, many post-revolution letters were adopted to better compose Russian words adopted into the language. As such, it took on this form (non-Russian letters bolded):

Аа	Бб	Вв	Гг	Дд	**Јј**	Ее	Жж
Зз	Ии	Йй	Кк	Лл	Мм	Нн	**Ҥҥ**
Оо	**Ӧӧ**	Пп	Рр	Сс	Тт	Уу	**Ӱӱ**
Фф	Хх	Цц	Чч	Шш	Щщ	Ъъ	Ыы
Ьь	Ээ	Юю	Яя

Interestingly, in the same space, many considered adapting the old Mongolian script for use in writing Altai.

=== Latin alphabet (1928–1938) ===
The Latin alphabet was eventually adopted and was used from 1922 to 1928. The final version of this alphabet was published in 1931, taking this form:

Aa	Bʙ	Cc	Çç	Dd	Ee	Ff	Gg
Ii	Jj	Kk	Ll	Mm	Nn	Ŋŋ	Oo
Ɵɵ	Pp	Rr	Ss	Şş	Tt	Uu	Vv
Xx	Yy	Zz	Ƶƶ	Ьь

The Latin letters correspond as follows to the modern Cyrillic letters:

Latin (1922–1938)	Modern Cyrillic (after 1944)
Cc	Чч
Çç	Јj
Jj	Йй
Ŋŋ	Ҥҥ
Ɵө	Ӧö
Şş	Шш
Yy	Ӱÿ
Ƶƶ	Жж
Ьь	Ыы

=== Second Cyrillic alphabet (1938–1944) ===
In 1938, the Central Research Institute of Language and Writing of the Peoples of the USSR began the project of designing a new alphabet for Altai, based on the Cyrillic script. Its new alphabet consisted of all 33 Russian letters, as well as the letter ⟨Іі⟩, digraph ⟨Дь дь⟩ and the letter ⟨Ҥҥ⟩, for the phonemes [ɪ], [d͡ʒ] and [ŋ] respectively. However, this proposal was later rejected, because it could not accurately represent all of Altai's phonological inventory.

To amend for this deficiency, the Institute's first revised alphabet saw the graphemes ⟨Ёё⟩ and ⟨Юю⟩ for Altai's vowels [ø~œ] and [y] fall out of use, and the addition of two digraphs and two letters: ⟨Дь дь⟩ for [d͡ʒ], ⟨Нъ нъ⟩ for [ŋ], ⟨Ӧӧ⟩ for [ø~œ], and ⟨Ӱӱ⟩ for [y]. In the second revision, however, ⟨Нъ нъ⟩ was replaced with ⟨Ҥҥ⟩. Thus was created:

Аа	Бб	Вв	Гг	Дд	**Дь дь**	Ее	Ёё
Жж	Зз	Ии	**Іі**	Йй	Кк	Лл	Мм
Нн	**Ҥҥ**	Оо	**Ӧӧ**	Пп	Рр	Сс	Тт
Уу	**Ӱӱ**	Фф	Хх	Цц	Чч	Шш	Щщ
Ъъ	Ыы	Ьь	Ээ	Юю	Яя

Altai speakers accepted the first variant, but generally preferred ⟨Н' н'⟩ over ⟨Ҥҥ⟩.

=== Modern Standard Altai alphabet ===
The Institute's second Cyrillic alphabet had many shortcomings, thus begging for a reform, which was carried out in 1944. The usage of ⟨Ёё⟩ and ⟨Юю⟩ [ø~œ] and [y] was dropped entirely, being replaced by the adoption of the Institute's second revision's usages of ⟨Ӧӧ⟩, and ⟨Ӱӱ⟩, for native words. ⟨Дь дь⟩ was dropped in favour of ⟨Јј⟩; for ⟨Н' н'⟩, they finally accepted ⟨Ҥҥ⟩.

The letters ⟨Ёё⟩, ⟨Юю⟩, and ⟨Яя⟩ are still used, though they are reserved for only non-native, Russian loan-words; in modern Standard Altai, the equivalent sounds are written as ⟨йа⟩, ⟨йо⟩ and ⟨йу⟩, for native words. Words that were written as кая "cliff, rock" and коён "hare" are now written as кайа and койон respectively.

Аа	Бб	Вв	Гг	Дд	**Јј**	Ее	Ёё
Жж	Зз	Ии	Йй	Кк	Лл	Мм	Нн
**Ҥҥ**	Оо	**Ӧӧ**	Пп	Рр	Сс	Тт	Уу
**Ӱӱ**	Фф	Хх	Цц	Чч	Шш	Щщ	Ъъ
Ыы	Ьь	Ээ	Юю	Яя

== Morphology and syntax ==
=== Pronouns ===
Altai has six personal pronouns:

Personal pronouns in Standard/Southern dialect
	Singular	Plural
1st person	мен men I	бис bis we
2nd person	сен sen you (singular)	слер sler you (plural, formal)
3rd person	ол ol he/she/it	олор olor they

The declension of the pronouns is outlined in the following chart.

Declension of pronouns in Standard/Southern dialect
Nom	мен	сен	ол	бис	слер	олор
Acc	мени	сени	оны	бисти	слерди	олорды
Gen	мениҥ	сениҥ	оныҥ	бистиҥ	слердиҥ	олордыҥ
Dat	меге	сеге	ого	биске	слерге	олорго
Loc	менде	сенде	ондо	бисте	слерде	олордо
Abl	менеҥ	сенеҥ	оноҥ	бистеҥ	слердеҥ	олордоҥ
Inst	мениле	сениле	оныла	бисле	слерле	олорло

Pronouns in the various dialects vary considerably. For example, the pronouns in the Qumandin dialect follow.

Personal pronouns in Qumandin
	Singular	Plural
1st person	мен men I	пис pis we
2nd person	сен sen you (singular)	снер sner you (plural, formal)
3rd person	ол ol he/she/it	анар anar they

== Sample text ==
=== The Bible in Altai ===
Cyrillic script

1. Иисус Христостыҥ ада-ӧбӧкӧлӧри. Ол Давид ле Авраамныҥ калдыгы.
2. Авраамнаҥ Исаак туулган, Исаактаҥ Иаков туулган, Иаковтоҥ Иуда ла оныҥ карындаштары туулган;
3. Иуданыҥ ӱйи болгон Фамарьдаҥ Фарес ле Зара туулган, Фарестеҥ Есром туулган, Есромноҥ Арам туулган;
4. Арамнаҥ Аминадав туулган, Аминадавтаҥ Наассон туулган, Наассонноҥ Салмон туулган;
5. Салмонныҥ ӱйинеҥ, Рахавтаҥ, Вооз туулган, Воозтыҥ эмеени Руфьтаҥ Овид туулган, Овидтеҥ Иессей туулган;
6. Иессейдеҥ Давид-каан туулган, Давид-кааннаҥ Соломон туулган, Соломонныҥ энези дезе Урияныҥ башкыдагы ӱйи болгон;
7. Соломонноҥ Ровоам туулган, Ровоамнаҥ Авия туулган, Авиядаҥ Асаф туулган;
8. Асафтаҥ Иосафат туулган, Иосафаттаҥ Иорам туулган, Иорамнаҥ Озия туулган;
9. Озиядаҥ Иоафам туулган, Иоафамнаҥ Ахаз туулган, Ахазтаҥ Езекия туулган;
10. Езекиядаҥ Манассия туулган, Манассиядаҥ Амон туулган, Амонноҥ Иосия туулган;
11. Иосиядаҥ Иоаким туулган, Вавилон јерине кӧчӱрердеҥ озо Иоакимнеҥ Иехония ла оныҥ карындаштары туулган;
12. Вавилонго кӧчӱрген соҥында Иехониядаҥ Салафиил туулган, Салафиилдеҥ Зоровавел туулган;
13. Зоровавелдеҥ Авиуд туулган, Авиудтаҥ Елиаким туулган, Елиакимнеҥ Азор туулган;
14. Азордоҥ Садок туулган, Садоктоҥ Ахим туулган, Ахимнеҥ Елиуд туулган;
15. Елиудтаҥ Елеазар туулган, Елеазардаҥ Матфан туулган, Матфаннаҥ Иаков туулган;
16. Иаковтоҥ Марияныҥ эш-нӧкӧри Иосиф туулган, Мариядаҥ Христос дейтен Иисус туулган.
17. Анайдарда, Авраамнаҥ ала Давидке јетире бастыразы он тӧрт ӱйе; Давидтеҥ ала Вавилонго кӧчӱргенине јетире база он тӧрт ӱйе; Вавилонго кӧчӱргенинеҥ ала Христоско јетире база он тӧрт ӱйе.

Latin script

1. Yisus Hristosıñ ada öbökölöri, ol David le Avraamnıñ qaldığı
2. Avraamnañ İsaak túlğan, İsaaktañ Yakov tuulgan, Yakovtoñ Yuda la onıñ qarındaştarımı tuulgan
3. Yudanıñ üyi bolgon Famardañ Fares le Zara túlğan, Faresteñ Yesrom Aram túlğan
4. Aramnañ Aminadav túlğan, Aminadavtañ Naasson túlğan, Nassonnoñ Salmon túlğan,
5. Salmonnıñ üyineñ, Rahavtañ, Vóz túlğan, Vóztıñ eméni Ruftañ Ovid túlğan, Ovidteñ İyessey túlğan,
6. İyesseydeñ David-qán túlğan, David-qán'nañ Solomon túlğan, Solomon'nıñ enezi deze Uriyanıñ başqıdağı üyi bolğon
7. Solomonnıñ Rovåm tuulgan, Rovoamnañ Aviya túlğan, Aviyadañ Asaf túlğan
8. Asaftañ Yosafat túlğan, Yosafattan Yoram túlğan, Yoramnañ Oziya túlğan
9. Oziyadañ Yåfam tuulgan, Yåfamnañ Ahaz túlğan, Ahaztañ Yezekiya túlğan
10. Yezekiyadan Manassiya túlğan, Manassiyadañ Amon túlğan, Amonnoñ Yosiya túlğan
11. Yosiyadañ Yåkim túlğan, Vavilon cerine köçürerdeñ ozo Yåkimneñ İyehoniya la onıñ qarındaştarı túlğan;
12. Vavilongo köçürgen soñında İyehoniyadañ Salafiil túlğan, Salafiildeñ Zorovavel túlğan;
13. Zorovaveldeñ Aviud túlğan, Aviudtañ Yelâkimtuulgan, Yelâkimneñ Azor túlğan;
14. Azordoñ Sadoq tuulgan, Sadoqtoñ Ahim túlğan, Ahimneñ Yeliud tuulgan;
15. Yeliudtañ Yelêzar tuulgan, Yelêzardañ Matfan túlğan, Matfannañ Yakov tuulgan;
16. Yakovtoñ Mariyanıñ eş-nököri Yosif túlğan, Mariyadañ Hristos deyten Yisus túlğan.
17. Anaydarga, Avraamnañ ala Davidke cetire baştırazı on tört üye; Davidteñ ana Vavilongo köçürgenine cetire baza on tört üye; Vavilongo köçürgenineñ ala Hristosko cetire baza on tört üye.

== See also ==
- Telengits, Teleuts (related ethnic groups)
- Turkic peoples
