= Chud (disambiguation) =

Chud is an East Slavic word for medieval Finnic peoples.

Chud or CHUD may also refer to:

== Arts and media ==
- CHUD.com, or Cinematic Happenings Under Development, an American film review website
- C.H.U.D. (Cannibalistic Humanoid Underground Dwellers), a 1984 horror film
  - C.H.U.D. II: Bud the C.H.U.D., a 1989 sequel to C.H.U.D.

== People ==
- Chud Langton (1912–1942), South African cricketer
- Chud the Builder (born 1997), American livestreamer
- Dr. Chud (born 1964), American drummer for punk rock band Misfits
- Rob Chudzinski (born 1968), American football coach

== Other uses ==
- Chud (folklore), ancient mythical, white-eyed people in folklore
- Chud (pejorative), term for a person with far-right political views
- Chud Lake, on the border of Estonia and Russia
- CHUD Tools, a set of software tools to measure software performance on Mac OS X
- René Chudeau (botanical author abbreviation Chud.)

== See also ==
- Chude (disambiguation)
