= Altai peoples =

Turkic people in Siberia and Central Asia

Алтайлар Алтай-кижи
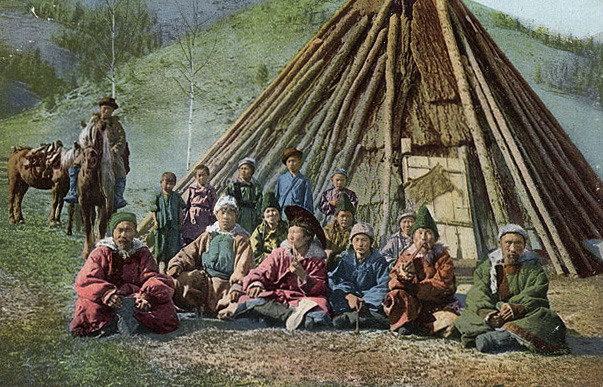
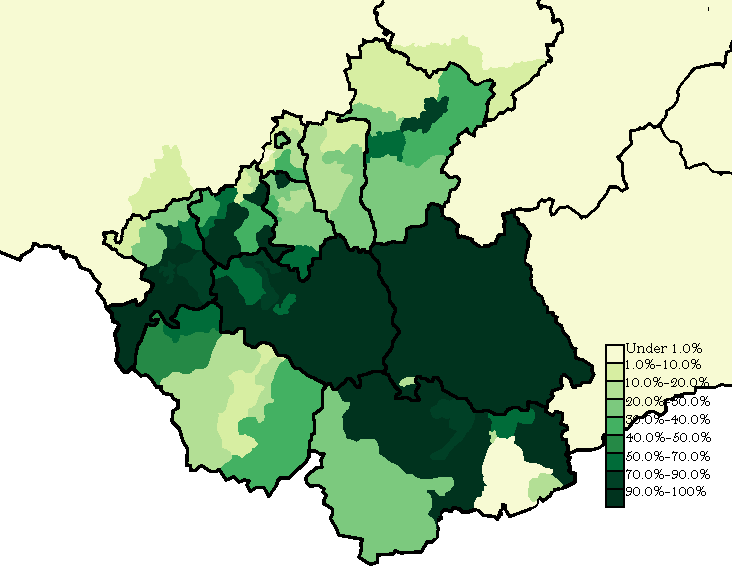
- Top: Altai people in 1911. Bottom: Altai people in the Altai Republic and neighboring areas

Total population
- 83,326

Regions with significant populations
- Russia: Altai Republic; Altai Krai: 83,125
- Mongolia and China: several thousand
- Kazakhstan: 201

Languages
- Altai languages (Northern or Southern), Russian

Religion
- up to 86% "Altai Faith" (modern synthesis of Burkhanism, Shamanism, other indigenous religions), other Russian Orthodoxy, Baptist Protestantism, Tibetan Buddhism, and Sunni Islam

Related ethnic groups
- Oirats, other Turkic peoples Northern Altaians: Shors, Yugurs, Chulyms, Khakas, Fuyu Kyrgyz, and other Siberian Turkic peoples, Siberian Tatars; Southern Altaians: Siberian Tatars, Kyrgyz, and other Kipchak peoples

Flag of the Altai Republic

The Altai peoples (Altay: Алтай-кижи, romanized: Altay-kiji, IPA: [ɐɫtʰɐ́ɪ̯ kʰɪʑí]) or Altaians (Altay: Алтайлар, romanized: Altaylar, IPA: [ɐɫtʰɐɪ̯ɫɐ́r]) are several related Turkic-speaking ethnic groups of Siberia mainly living in the Altai Republic, a federal subject of Russia. Several thousand of the Altaians also live in Mongolia (Altai Mountains) and China (Altay Prefecture, Xinjiang) but are not officially recognized as a distinct group and listed under the name "Oirats" as a part of the Mongols, as well as in Kazakhstan where they number around 200. For alternative ethnonyms see also Tele, Black Tatar, and Oirats. During the Northern Yuan dynasty, they were ruled in the administrative area known as Telengid Province.

== Ethnic groups and subgroups ==
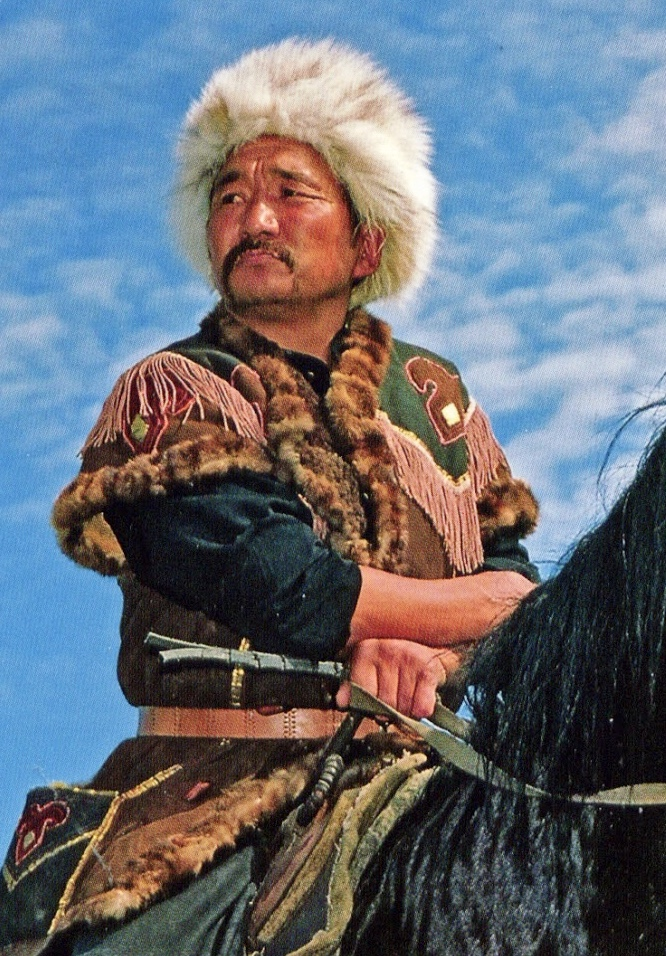
Altai horseman

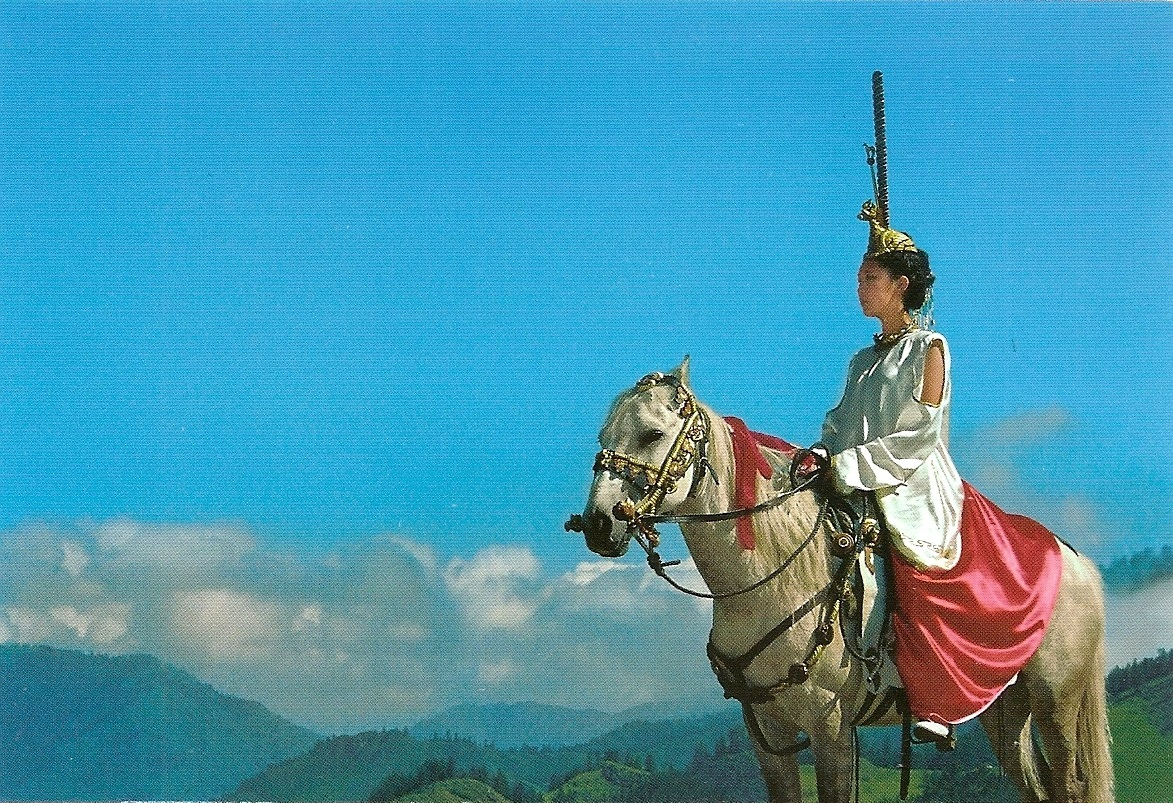
Altai woman

The Altaians are represented by two ethnographic groups:

- The Northern Altaians, who speak the Northern Altai language and dialects, include the Chelkans, Kumandins, and Tubalars (Tuba-Kizhi).
- The Southern Altaians, who speak the Southern Altai language with its dialects, include the Altai-Kizhi, Teleuts, and Telengits. The Telesy were previously included but are now assimilated into the Telengits.

The Northern and Southern Altaians formed in the Altai area on the basis of tribes of Kimek-Kipchaks.

In the Soviet Union until 1991 and the Russian Federation until 2000, the authorities considered the Northern Altaians and the Teleuts to be part of the Altai people. Currently, according to the Resolution of the Government of the Russian Federation No. 255 dated March 24, 2000, the Chelkans, Kumandins, Telengits, Teleuts, and Tubalars were recognized as separate ethnic groups as well as the indigenous small-numbered peoples of the North, Siberia and the Far East. However, in the 2010 Russian Census, the only recognized distinct ethnic groups are the Kumandins and Teleuts.

== History ==
The Altai region came within the sphere of influence of the Scythians, Xiongnu, the Rouran Khaganate, the Turkic Khaganate, the Uyghur Empire, and the Yenisei Kyrgyz.

One study in 2016 suggest that, the Altaians, precisely some Southern Altaians, mixed with local Yeniseian people up to ~20% which were closely related to the Paleo-Eskimo groups.

From the 13th to 18th century, the Altai people were dominated politically and culturally by the Mongols. The origin of the Southern Altaians can be traced during this period from the result of the mixing of Kipchak and Mongol tribes. Meanwhile, the Northern Altaians were a result of the fusion of Turkic tribes with Samoyeds, Kets, and other indigenous Siberian ethnic groups.

The Altaians were annexed by the Four Oirat of Western Mongols in the 16th century. The Mongols called them "Telengid" or "Telengid aimag" in the period of the Northern Yuan dynasty, with the region known as Telengid Province. After the fall of the Zunghar Khanate in the 18th century, the Altaians were subjugated by the Qing dynasty, which referred to them as Altan Nuur Uriyangkhai. Altaians are genetically related to the Uriyangkhai, which is a common neighbouring Oirat Mongol ethnic group in Mongolia.

The Altai people came into contact with Russians in the 18th century. In the Tsarist period, the Altai were also known as Oirot or Oyrot (this name means "Oirat" and would later be carried on for the Oyrot Autonomous Oblast). The name was inherited from their being former subjects of the 17th-century Oirat-led Dzungar Khanate. The Altai report that many of them became addicted to the Russians' vodka, which they called "fire water".

With regard to religion, some of the Altai remained shamanists and others (in a trend beginning in the mid-19th century) have converted to the Russian Orthodox Church. In 1904, a millenarian indigenist religious movement called Ak-Jang or Burkhanism arose among these people. Prior to 1917, the Altai were considered to be made up of many different ethnic groups.

With the rise of the 1917 Russian revolution, Altai nationalists and Socialist-Revolutionaries attempted to make a separate Burkhanist republic called the Confederated Republic of Altai (Karakorum-Altai Region), although only as part of the Russian Federation. They also hoped to extend its territory to form a larger Oyrot republic that would include other former subjects of the Dzungar Khanate or even all Turkic peoples of Siberia. Many Altai leaders supported the Mensheviks during the Civil War. After the Bolshevik victory, a separate Oyrot Autonomous Oblast was established as a national home for the Altais. In the 1940s, during World War II, Joseph Stalin's government accused Altai nationalists of being pro-Japanese. After the war, the word "Oyrot" was declared to be counter-revolutionary due to its associations with the idea of a larger Oyrot state that could secede from the USSR. Because of that, the oblast was renamed to Gorno-Altai Autonomous Oblast. By 1950, Soviet industrialization policies and development in this area resulted in considerable migration of Russians to this republic, reducing the proportion of Altai in the total population from 50% to 20%.

In 1990, the Gorno-Altai Autonomous Oblast was declared an autonomous republic, the Gorno-Altai Autonomous Soviet Socialist Republic, which was renamed to the Altai Republic in 1992. In the early 21st century, ethnic Altaians make up about 31% of the Altai Republic's population. Today, the special interests of the Altaians are articulated and defended by the Association of Northern Ethnoses of Altai.

== Demographics ==
A Voice of America reporter tours the Altai region in 2012

According to the 2010 Russian census, there was a total of 69,963 Altaians who resided within the Altai Republic. This represented 34.5% of the total population of the republic, compared with 56.6% with a Russian background, Altaian families are the majority only in certain villages. However, Altaian culture is still the local culture between people and communities.

== Culture ==
=== Traditional lifestyle ===
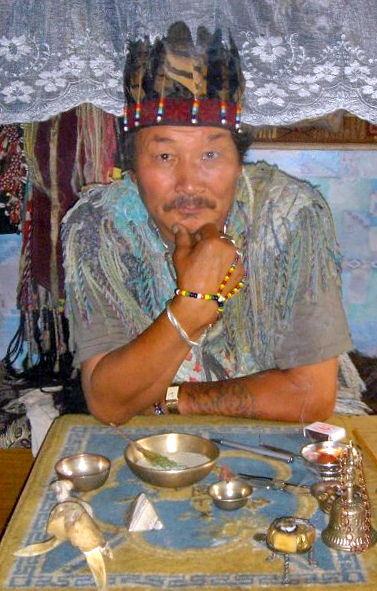
Altai shaman in Kyzyl, Tuva

The Southern Altaians were mostly nomadic or semi-nomadic livestock holders. They raised horses, goats, sheep, and cattle. The Northern Altaians mainly engaged in hunting as their primary form of subsistence. Their main prey were animals from the taiga (boreal forests). However, some Altaians also engaged in small scale agriculture, gathering, and fishing.

=== Dwellings ===
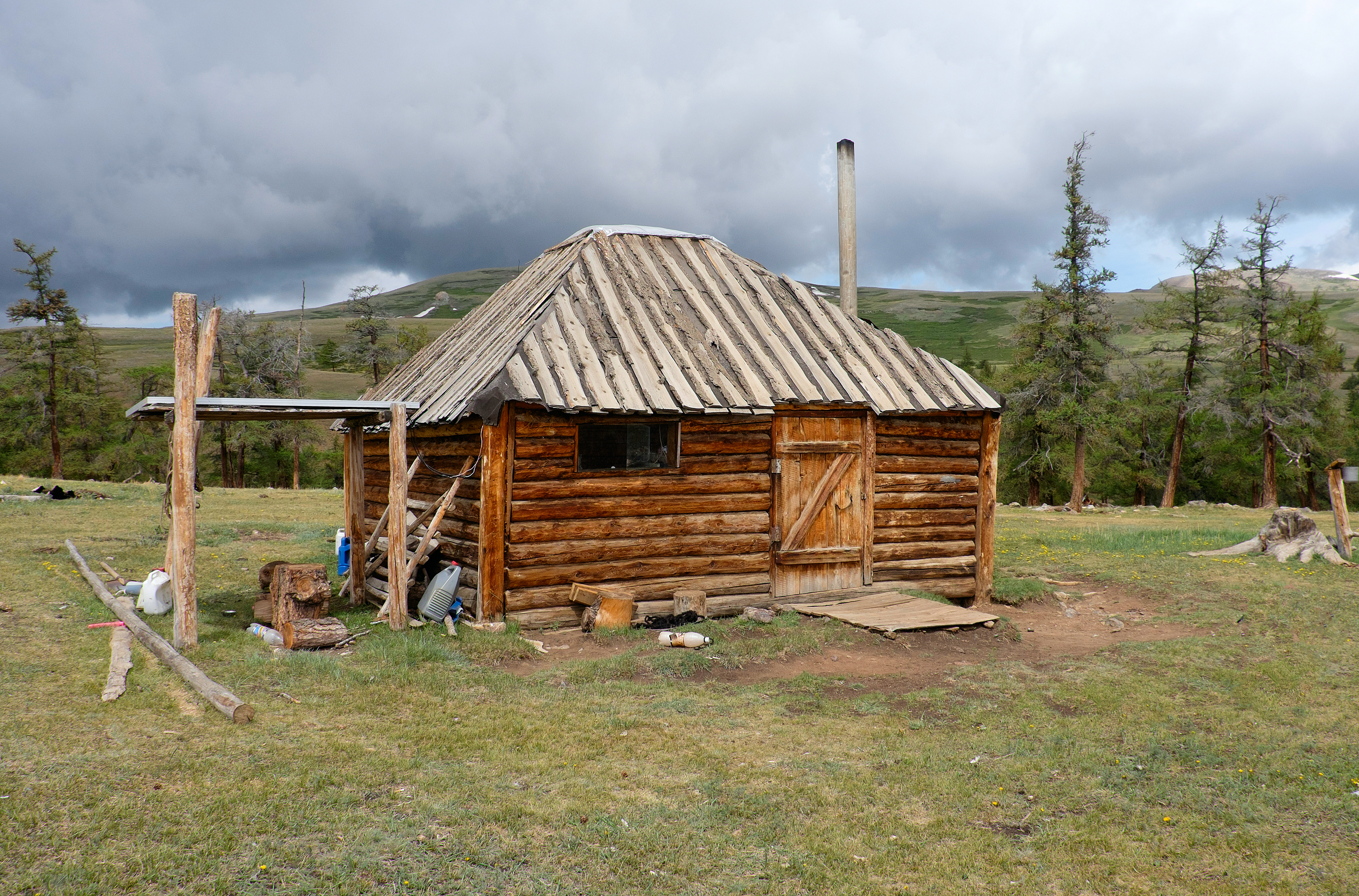
Ail, the traditional wooden dwelling

Most of the Southern Altaians traditionally lived in yurts. Many Northern Altaians mainly built polygonal yurts with conic roofs made out of logs and bark. Some Altai-Kizhi also lived in mud huts with birch bark gable roofs and log or plank walling. The Teleuts and a few Northern Altaians lived in conic homes made out of perches or bark. With the influx of Russians near the homeland of the Altaians, there was an increase of the construction of large huts with two to four slope roofs in consequence of Russian influence. Despite the many social and political changes the Altaians have endured, many modern and settled families still keep a yurt in their yards. These yurts are usually used as a summertime kitchen or extra room.

=== Clothing ===
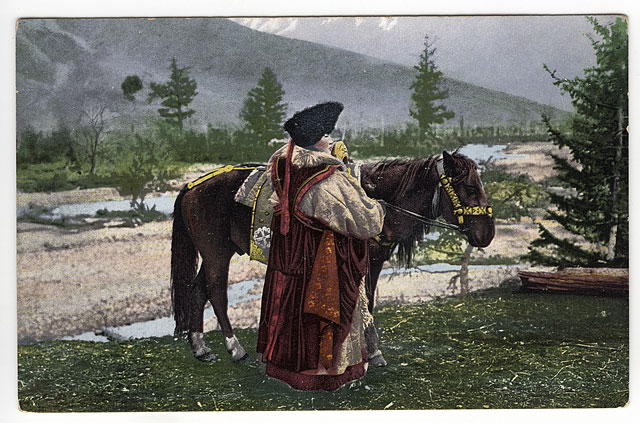
Altai woman in national dress

Historically, the traditional clothing of Southern Altaian men and women was very similar with little differences between the two. Average clothing consisted of long shirts with wide breeches, robes, and fur coats. Other apparel often included fur hats, high boots, and sheepskin coats. Northern Altaians and some Teleuts traditionally wore short breeches, linen shirts, and single-breasted oriental robes. Despite the fact that most Altaians today wear modern clothes, traditional wear still remains in use.

=== Cuisine ===
Altai cuisine consists of soups of horseflesh or mutton. Dishes with souslik, badger, marmot, fermented milk, cream (from boiled milk), blood pudding, butter, fried barley flour, and certain vegetables are also staples of Altai cuisine. Popular drinks include aryki (hard liquor made from kumis).

== Religion ==
=== History ===
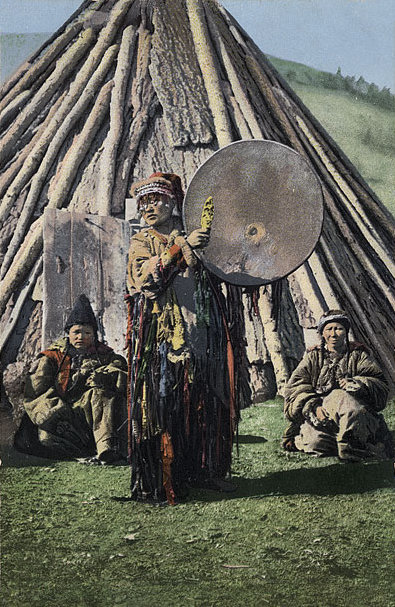
Altai shaman with drum, Russian Empire, 1908

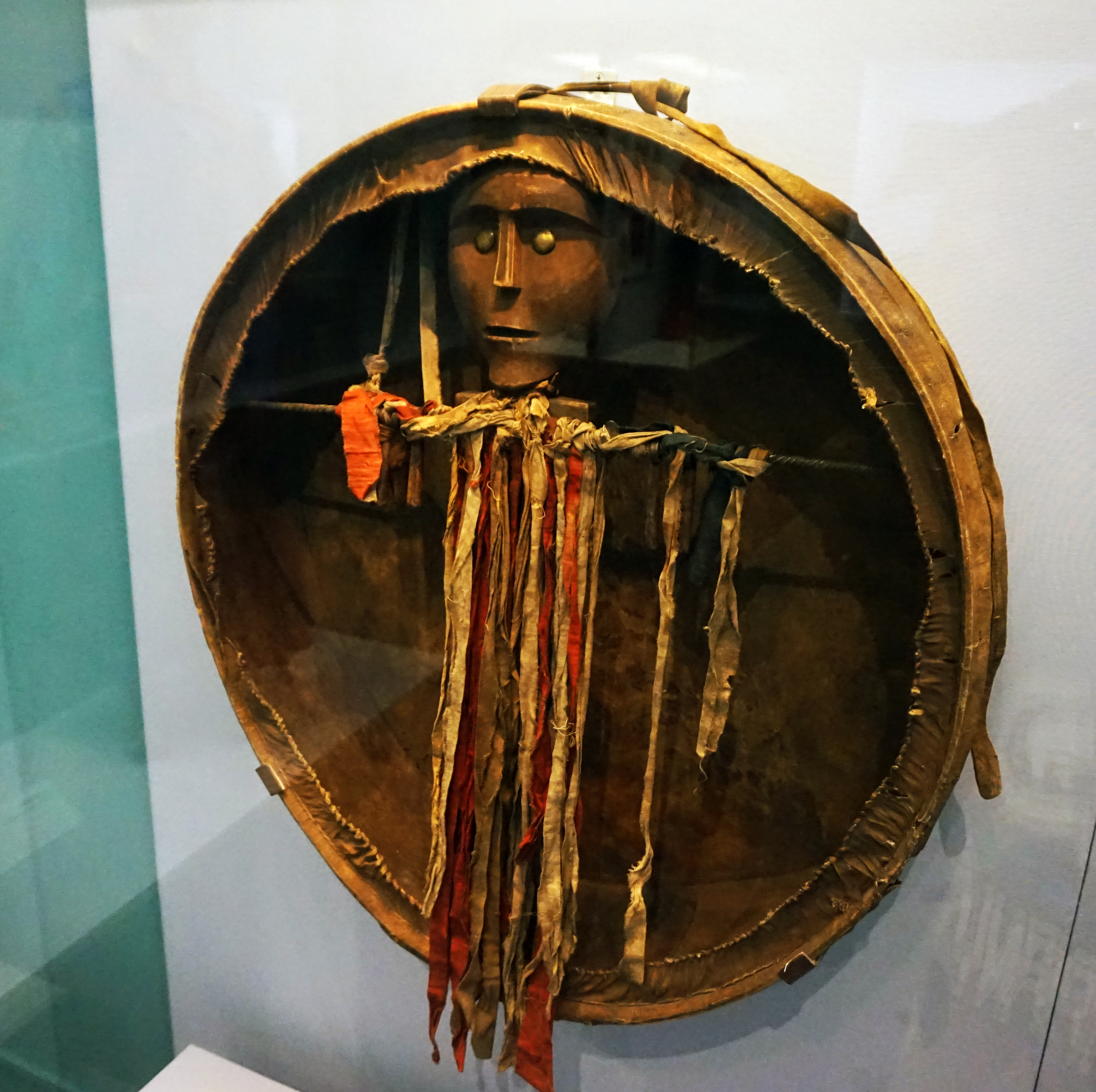
Altai shamanic drum

Traditional Altai shamanism is rich with mythology and supernatural beings. Popular deities included Erlik, the god of the underworld, and Oyrot-Khan, a heroic figure who is a composite blend taken from historical Zungarian (Oirat) Khans and ancient legendary heroes. However, with many migrations, settlement changes, and the presence of Russians and their eventual union with the Russian Empire, the Altaians encountered three world religions: Buddhism, Christianity, and Islam. At first, the Altaians were indifferent and at times even hostile to these foreign faiths and their expansion in the region (modern Altai Republic). In 1829, a Russian Orthodox mission was founded in the region soon after it became a protectorate of the Russian Empire. The mission and its missionaries were initially culturally sensitive and tolerant to the Altaians and their customs. However, the rise of Russian nationalism during the late 19th century caused the Russification of Orthodox Christianity in the country, and the mostly Russian clergy in Siberia also took up the ideology. This created intolerant views of the natives of Siberia (including the Altaians) and of their culture. This led to the rejection of Christianity by many Altaians, who saw it as a foreign Russian religion. However, Russian rule continued to grow increasingly strict both politically and religiously. Russian Orthodox missionaries regularly confiscated land from Altaians who refused to convert to Christianity. Altaians were often forcefully converted to Christianity.

Mongolian Buddhist missionaries attempted to spread the faith among the Altaians during the 19th century. The Buddhist missionaries also encouraged the Altaians to unite together against the Russians. However, their activities and preaching were suppressed both by the Russian state and Orthodox Christian missionaries. Buddhism made little headway among the Altaians but many Buddhist ideas and principles filtered into Altai spiritual beliefs. However, some Altaians reportedly visited Mongolia and studied at Buddhist centers of learning before and after the rise of the Burkhanist movement in the early 20th century; indicating a significant Buddhist influence on the new religion. Additionally, Mongolian Lamas were reported to have occasionally visited the region throughout the rest of the 19th century and into the early 20th century to dispense religious services to locals that requested them.

Around 1904, the development of Burkhanism among the Altaians was underway. Burkhanism is a monotheistic religion named after Ak-Burkhan, a deity who is believed and recognized by its adherents to have been the sole god. Burkhanism was opposed to both the Russians and the traditional Altai shamans. The hostility towards the shamans was so great that the shamans had to seek protection from Russian authorities. The rise of the Bolsheviks in the first quarter of the 20th century also led to the brutal repression of all religions, which included the indigenous faiths of the Altai people. For the next few decades, public expressions of religion severely declined with only shamanistic and ancient polytheistic beliefs surviving the chaos. This was believed to have occurred because ancient religious beliefs could be easily orally transmitted from generation to another. It's also likely that no Burkhanist texts survived the repression and main sources for the beliefs of the religion come from Russian missionaries, travellers, and scholars.

=== Modern spirituality ===
Recently, both Burkhanism and traditional Altai shamanism have seen a revival in the Altai region, which is especially popular among Altaian youth. According to recent statistical studies, up to 70% or 86% (data of the Research State Institute of Altaic Studies) of the Altaians continue to profess the "Altai Faith": Burkhanism, shamanism, and other native religions. According to Natalia Zhukovskaia, traditional Altai shamanism is the supreme religion of the majority of the Altai people.

At present, shamanism is practiced by many Telengits, although there is a large amount that also profess Orthodox Christianity. Burkhanism is the main religion of the Altai-Kizhi, the largest group of Altaians, but there is a significant number of Orthodox Christians. The majority of Kumandins, Tubalars, Teleuts, and Chelkans are Russian Orthodox, although there is a significant minority that practice shamanism. A few Altaians are Evangelical Christians and Tibetan Buddhists. There has been a revival of Tibetan Buddhism amongst the Altaians since the 1980s and there are now several Buddhist organizations, stupas and other religious infrastructure in the region.

In principle, the division into the Burkhanists and shamanists has ceased to be relevant for the contemporary religiosity of the Altaians. According to a number of studies, by the beginning of the 21st century, there were practically no traditional shamans or classical Burkhanists anti-shamanists. The main one was the single "Altai Faith" (Altay: Алтай јаҥ, romanized: Altai jang)—a traditional ethnic religion in the form of a synthesis of Burkhanism with the remnants of Altai shamanism, Mongolian and Tibetan Buddhism, and other tribal beliefs and customs.

== Genetics ==
Y Chromosome

Altai population can be divided into northern and southern clusters based on linguistics, culture, and genetics. According to a 2012 study that analyzed mtDNA (by PCR-RFLP analysis and control region sequencing) and nonrecombinant Y-DNA (by scoring more than 100 biallelic markers and 17 Y-STRs) obtained from Altaian samples, northern Altaians are genetically more similar to Yeniseian, Ugric, and Samoyeds to the north, while southern Altaians having greater affinities to other Turkic speaking populations of southern Siberia and Central Asia. The same study conducted a high-resolution analysis of Y chromosome Haplogroup Q-M242 that was found in Altaian samples and concluded that southern Altaians and indigenous peoples of the Americas share a recent common ancestor.

According to a new study by Russian geneticists, a genetic separation of the northern and southern Altaians is undeniable. The southern Altaians are dominated by such variants of the Y chromosome haplogroup as Q-M242 and R1a, and there are also I-M170 and O-M175. Within the northern Altaians, the R1a haplogroup is dominant, Q-M242 is rarely found, and I-M170 and O-M175 are not found at all.

Mitochondrial DNA

The maternal genetic ancestry of northern and southern Altaian populations was explored by characterizing coding region SNPs and control region sequences from 490 inhabitants of the Altai Republic. Differences in mtDNA haplogroup profiles were observed among northern Altaian ethnic groups and between northern Altaians and Altai-kizhi, with the Chelkans being extraordinarily distinct. Nevertheless, comparisons among other Altaian ethnic groups revealed some consistent patterns. mtDNA haplogroups B, C, D, and U4 were found in all Altaian populations, but at varying frequencies, whereas southern Altaians (Altai-kizhi, Telengits, and Teleuts) tended to have a greater variety of West Eurasian haplogroups at low frequencies. Shors, who have sometimes been categorized as northern Altaians,18 exhibited a similar haplogroup profile to other northern Altaian ethnic groups, including moderate frequencies of C, D, and F1, although they lacked others (N9a and U). Haplogroups C and D were the most frequent mtDNA lineages in the Altaians, consistent with the overall picture of the Siberian mtDNA gene pool.

== See also ==
- Govi-Altai Province
