= Chud (folklore) =

Ancient mythical people in Russian and Finnish folklore

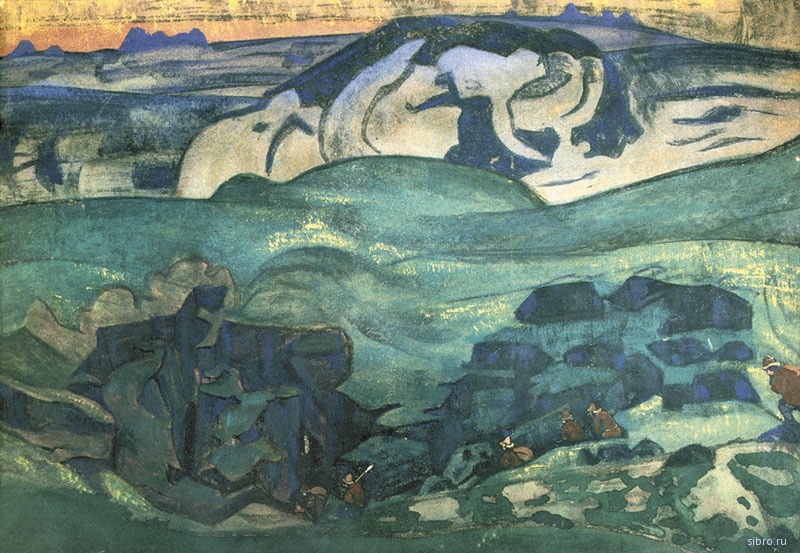
The Chud fleeing underground, depicted by Nicholas Roerich in The Underground Chud (1913)

Chud (chud beloglazaya, Russian: чудь белогла́зая) are an ancient mythical people within Russian and Finno-Ugric (in particular Komi and Sámi) folklore.

Similar legends are known among the Siberian Tatars and Mansi about the Sabirs/Savirs, among the Altai people about the Buruts, and among the Nenets about the Sikhirtya.

== Lore ==
Legends describe the Chud as white-eyed, short-statured people who were incredibly wealthy.

=== Komi ===
In Komi myths, they live "like animals" in the forests, eating game and wearing animal skins. However, when Stephen of Perm came to them wanting to baptize them and the Russian tsar demanded tax from them, the Chud went into hiding underground with all their enormous wealth.

Other Komi sources describe the Chud people as black, anthropomorphic creatures with shaggy hair and pig legs. They lived in a universe where the distance from the earth to the sky could be measured by an outstretched arm of a woman. This compression of space conditioned the small size of the people and the world (i.e. the grass was like a forest - they could hide themselves underneath the teeth of a harrow). During these times, crops grew by themselves, people did not suffer from famine, children walked and spoke from birth, and death was non-existent. This perfect world became our imperfect world due to the erratic and offensive behavior of these people (e.g. digging pits on arable land, mowing grass with chisels, chopping trees with knives, and wiping the sky with dirty cloths). These actions angered the sky God, and so the sky rose high, the crops were less prosperous and the Chud people were replaced with humans. Unlike the Chud, Humans became taller and whiter. They could not walk and speak from birth, but gained the ability to think and use logic. Unable to adapt and bear this new world, the Chud people buried themselves in a pit, which appeared to be death by suicide. The remaining Chud people were transformed into what are now known as Demons.

=== Finno-Ugric ===
Presumably, the legends are based on ancient Finno-Ugric stories about the departure of the indigenous population or the death of the first generation of people. There are two versions of the plot in folklore: a heroic one about idealized ancient times and an anecdotal one about a stupid people who are unlike modern people. These plots coexist in different proportions: among the Komi and Mordvins, the Chud are identified with the ancestral people, while among the Russians and Sami, anecdotes about fools come to the fore.

=== Russian ===
The historical people, previously referred to as the Zavoloch Chud, have now been completely assimilated among the Vepsians, Russians, and Komi, but the Russian population of Zavolochye (historical region in the basin of the Northern Dvina and Onega, part of Arkhangelsk Oblast) has preserved the memory of the Chud who used to live in these areas. Among the surviving legends about the Chud in Verkhokamye (historical and cultural region in the upper Kama river area, covering parts of Perm Krai and Udmurtia), common themes about resistance to Slavic invaders and Christianization are repeated. The forest is called its habitat, and dugouts are its dwelling. For defense, the Chud built earthen fortresses, defended themselves fiercely, and if unsuccessful, fled deeper into the forests or killed themselves; only a few remained in their former places of residence.

A legend was recorded about how the Chud "went underground" - they dug a large hole with an earthen roof on pillars, and buried themselves, cutting down the pillars. D. V. Bubrih in his book The Origin of the Karelian People suggested that the ethnic composition of the historical Zavoloch Chud was heterogeneous; it was formed by representatives of the Ves ("white-eyed Chud") and Meryans ("black Chud"). In the upper reaches of the Moloma and in Karelia, there were stories about the "white-eyed Chud". The legends about the Chud were brought to the Urals by settlers from the Russian North.

The dictionary of Vladimir Dal states:

A savage people who lived, according to legend, in Siberia and left behind only a memory of themselves in the mounds (kurgans, graves); frightened by Yermak and by the white birch that suddenly appeared with him, a sign of the power of the White tsar, the Chud dug tunnels, went there with all their goods, cut the supports and perished.

— V. I. Dal, Explanatory Dictionary of the Living Great Russian Language

== Sources ==
- Bessonov, I. А. (2016), Мордовский эпос о Тюште и русские и финно-угорские предания о чуди [Mordovian Epic of Tyushta and Russian and Finno-Ugric Legends of the Chud], Традиционная культура (in Russian), no. 4, pp. 54–66
- Krinichnaya, Neonila Artemovna (1991). Предания Русского Севера [Legends of the Russian North] (in Russian). St. Petersburg.
- Limerov, P. F. (2009). Образ чуди в коми фольклоре [The Image of Chud in Komi Folklore]. News of the Ural State University. Series 2, Humanities (in Russian) (1/2 (63)): 81–90.
- Petrukhin, Vladimir Yakovlevich (2005). Мифы финно-угров [Myths of the Finno-Ugrians] (PDF). Мифы народов мира (in Russian). Мoscow: Астрель : АСТ : Транзиткнига. ISBN 5-17-019005-0.
- Pimenov, Vladimir Vladimirovich (1965). Вепсы: Очерк этнической истории и генезиса культуры [Vepsians: An Essay on Ethnic History and Genesis of Culture] (in Russian). Мoscow.
