= Kumandins =

Turkic ethnic group in Siberia

Къуманды, Къуванды(г) Kumandy, Kuvandy(g)
- Distribution of Kumandins in the Siberian Federal District

Total population
- 2,892

Regions with significant populations
- Russia: Altai Krai 1,401; Altai Republic 1,062; Kemerovo Oblast 225: 2,892

Languages
- Northern Altai (Kumandin dialect)

Religion
- Orthodox Christianity, also Shamanism, Burkhanism

Related ethnic groups
- Altaians, Siberian Tatars, Khakas, Shors, Teleuts, Tofalar

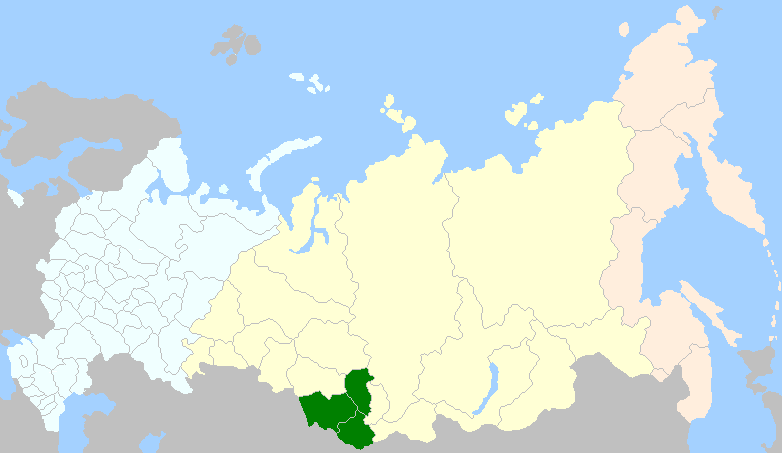
Primarily region of the Kumandins in Siberia.

The Kumandins (natively, Kumandy, Kuvandy(g)) are a Turkic Indigenous people of Siberia. They reside mainly in the Altai Krai and Altai Republic of the Russian Federation. They speak the Northern Altai Kumandin language.

According to the 1926 census, 6,335 Kumandins lived within the territory of Russia. In the 2010 census, the number was only 2,892, but possibly the 1926 census included some related peoples. Some Kumandins, living on the banks of the Biya River, from the Kuu River downstream, almost to the city of Biysk, and along the lower course of the Katun River, by 1969 were conflated with the Russians population.

In the Soviet years and until 2000, the authorities considered the Kumandins to be part of the Altai people. Currently, according to the Resolution of the Government of the Russian Federation No. 255 dated March 24, 2000, as well as the Russian Census (2002), they are recognized as a separate ethnic group within indigenous small-numbered peoples of the North, Siberia and the Far East. For ethnic rights protection was established the "Association of the Kumandin People Revival".

== Origins ==
Omeljan Pritsak claimed that kuman- in the name of the Kumandins is identical in meaning to the names given to the Turkic people, Cumans-Kipchaks and Polovets (a Slavic term for Cumans).

However, the seoks (tribes) of the Kumandins have varying origin myths; L. Potapov proposed that they were originally a federation of peoples from different backgrounds: nomadic steppe pastoralists (such as the Cumans), taiga hunters (Chuvash), deer pastoralists (Nenets), and fishers (Tatars).

[The] Kumans belonged to the Kuman-Kipchak confederation (Polevetses of the Rus annals, Comans of Byzantine sources, Folban of German annals) [and] during the period from the end of the 800s to 1230s CE spread their political influence in the broad steppes from Altai to Crimea and Danube. Irtysh with its adjoining steppes (at least below the lake Zaisan) was in the sphere of that confederation. Members of the confederation undoubtedly also were the ancestors of the present Kumandy and Teleuts, which is evidenced by their language that like the language of the Tobol-Irtysh and Baraba Tatars belongs to the Kypchak group.

By the 17th century, the Kumandins lived along the river Charysh, near its confluence with the river Ob. A subsequent relocation to the Altai was driven by their unwillingness to pay yasak (financial tribute) to the Russian sovereign. N. Aristov linked the Kumandins – and the Chelkans – to the ancient Turks, "who in the 6th-8th CC AD created in Central Asia a powerful nomadic state, which received ... the name Turkic Kaganate".

Potapov regarded the Kumandins as being related anthropologically to the peoples of the Urals, and suggested that they were less East Asian than the Altaians proper. This subjective impression has been borne out to an extent by genetic research (see below).

Six seoks have been identified:

Kumandin seok names	Proposed ethnolinguistic links	Period	Note
Soo (So)	possibly a proto-Turkic people; tribal names similar to Soo – the Sogo, Soko, Soo, and Soky – have been recorded among the Khakas and Yakuts	before 4th century	
Kubandy	possibly part of the Kangar confederation and/or Cumans	7th century	
Tastar	possibly also part of the Kangar confederation, Cumans and/or Ases	7th century	
Diuty (Chooty)	possibly Tele/Teleuts (part of the Türkic Kaganate)	6th to 8th centuries	
Chabash (Chabat)	possibly Chuvash	unknown	
Ton (Ton-Kubandy)	possibly a Nenets tribe, Tongjoan (Altays) and/or Tongak (Tuvinians)	12th century (The Secret History of the Mongols)	

An ancient Turkic legend recorded in the Chinese annal (Book of Zhou 周書, 636 CE) mentions the origin of the Göktürks' ancestors from a possession or state named Suǒ (索國; MC: *sak̚-kwək̚), located "north of the Xiongnu country" (which, in this case, apparently meant Mongolia).

The name of the seok Ton is explained as an ethnonym that reflects their economic specialization, as a word meaning "deer" and "reindeer breeder".Potapov (1969), pp. 60, 61 The remote ancestors of this Kumandy seok Ton were reindeer breeders, reflected in Kumandy hunting legends and fairy tales, for example about milking deer (which is attributed to the Kumandy's mountain spirits). The memory about breeding and milking reindeer belongs to some remote historical ancestors of a part of Kumandy; they can be explained by participation in the Kumandy ethnogenesis of the southern Nenets tribes, who cultivated riding deer, typically used not only for transport but also for food and dress.

== Genetics ==
Genetically, the Kumandins are different from the neighboring Altai peoples, into which they were tried to be included in the Soviet years. They are genetically isolated not only from the southern, but also from the northern Altaians. This is evidenced by the complete absence of the variants of the Y chromosome haplogroups—R1a and Q—which are absolutely dominant in Altai. The most common among the Kumandins is haplogroup N, which more than a half of Kumandin males belong to. Haplogroup R1b is in the second place (around 20%). The highest frequency R1b-M73 reaches among Eushta Tatars (35.3%) and Teleuts (31%).

By genetic research suggesting that most Kumandin males belong to Y-DNA haplogroups that are generally found in populations further to the west, such as R1b (although the Kumandins belong to the Asiatic subclade R1b-M73 rather than R1b-M269, the latter being the subclade to which a majority of Europeans belong) and N-P43 have remarked that, in fact, Chelkans and Kumandins have N-P43 Y chromosomes very similar to ones found in the Ugric-speaking Khanty). However, a majority of mitochondrial DNA lines belonged to the North East Asian haplogroups C or D with also a large minority of west Eurasian lineages such as U5a1 (5/52), H8 (3/52), U4b1b (2/52), X2e (2/52), and T1a (1/52).

== Culture ==
The Kumandins were originally hunters and animals living in the taiga were vital to the local subsistence economy. Around the 19th century, Kumandins took up picking cedar nuts as an additional economic activity.

The traditional dwellings of the Kumandins included polygonal yurts made out of bark or log and topped with a conic bark roof. Other types of dwellings also included conic yurts made out of bark or perches.

Traditional Kumandin dress included short breeches, linen shirts, and single-breasted robes.

== Religion ==
Most modern Kumandins are Orthodox Christians, but shamanism and Burkhanism is also practiced by some.
