= Turkic languages =

Language family of Eurasia

Turkic
- Geographic distribution: Eurasia
- Ethnicity: Turkic peoples
- Native speakers: c. 200 million (2020)
- Linguistic classification: One of the world's primary language families
- Proto-language: Proto-Turkic
- Subdivisions: Common Turkic; Oghuric

Language codes
- ISO 639-5: trk
- Glottolog: turk1311
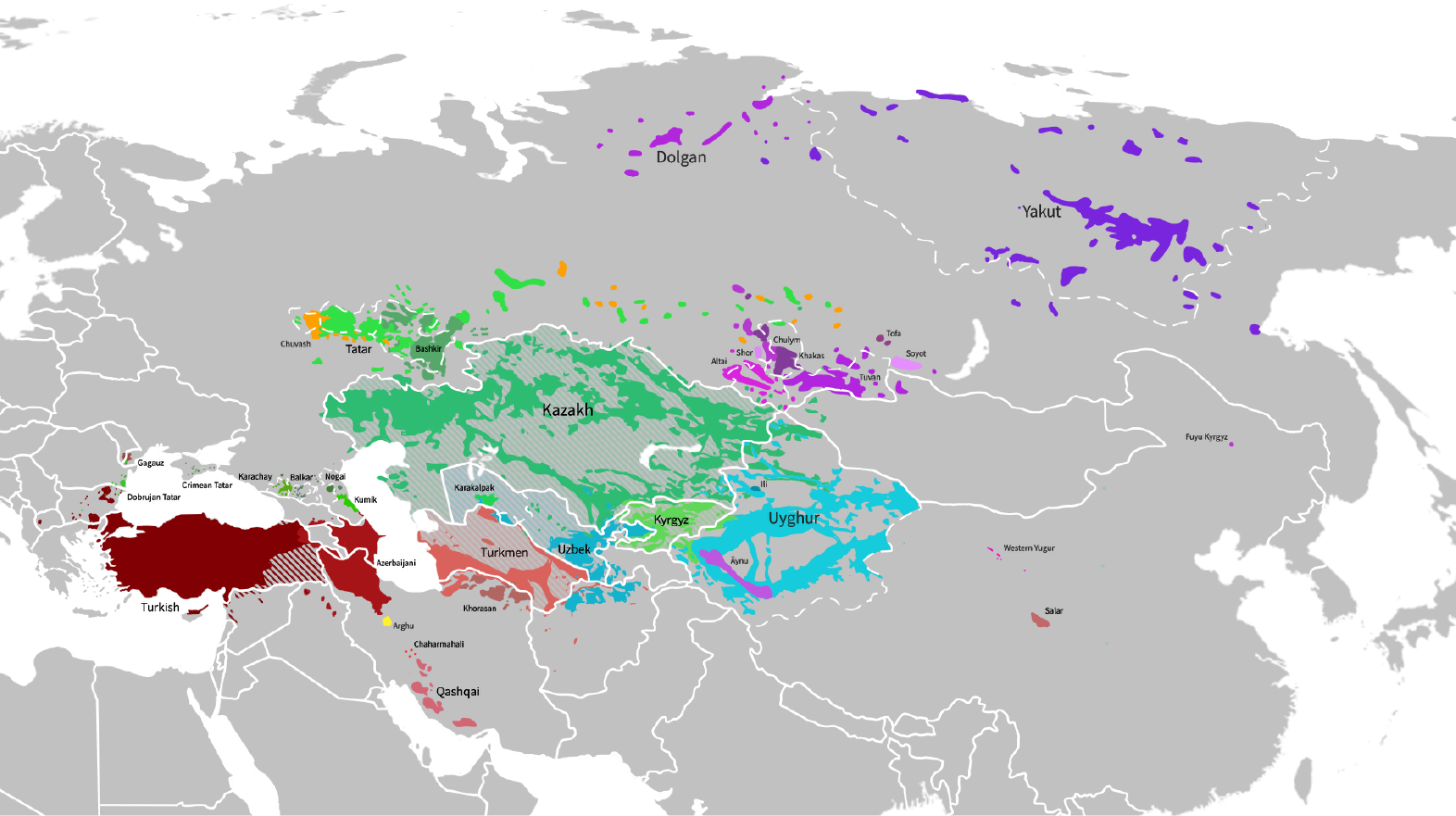
- The distribution of the Turkic languages

The Turkic languages are a language family of more than 35 documented languages spoken by the Turkic peoples of Eurasia, from Southeastern Europe and Eastern Europe to Central Asia, East Asia, North Asia (Siberia), and West Asia. The Turkic languages originated in a region of East Asia spanning from Mongolia to Northwest China, where Proto-Turkic is thought to have been spoken, and from where they expanded to Central Asia and farther west during the first millennium. They are characterized as a dialect continuum.

Turkic languages are spoken by some 200 million people. The Turkic language with the greatest number of speakers is Turkish, spoken mainly in Anatolia and the Balkans; its native speakers account for about 38% of all Turkic speakers, followed by Uzbek.

Characteristic features such as vowel harmony, agglutination, subject-object-verb order, and lack of grammatical gender are almost universal within the Turkic family. There is a high degree of mutual intelligibility, upon moderate exposure, among the various Oghuz languages, which include Turkish, Azerbaijani, Turkmen, Qashqai, Chaharmahali Turkic, Gagauz, and Balkan Gagauz, as well as Oghuz-influenced Crimean Tatar. Other Turkic languages demonstrate varying amounts of mutual intelligibility within their subgroups as well. Although methods of classification vary, the Turkic languages are usually considered to be divided into two branches: Oghur, of which the only surviving member is Chuvash, and Common Turkic, which includes all other Turkic languages.

Turkic languages show many similarities with the Mongolic, Tungusic, Koreanic, and Japonic languages. These similarities have led some linguists (such as Turkologist Talât Tekin) to propose an Altaic language family, though this proposal is widely rejected by historical linguists. Similarities with the Uralic languages even caused these families to be regarded as one for a long time under the Ural-Altaic hypothesis. However, there has not been sufficient evidence to conclude the existence of either of these macrofamilies. The shared characteristics between the languages are attributed presently to extensive prehistoric language contact.

On 15 December 1893, the Orkhon Inscriptions, one of the first Turkic texts, were decrypted. As a result, December 15 is declared as "World Turkic Language Family Day" by UNESCO.

== Characteristics ==
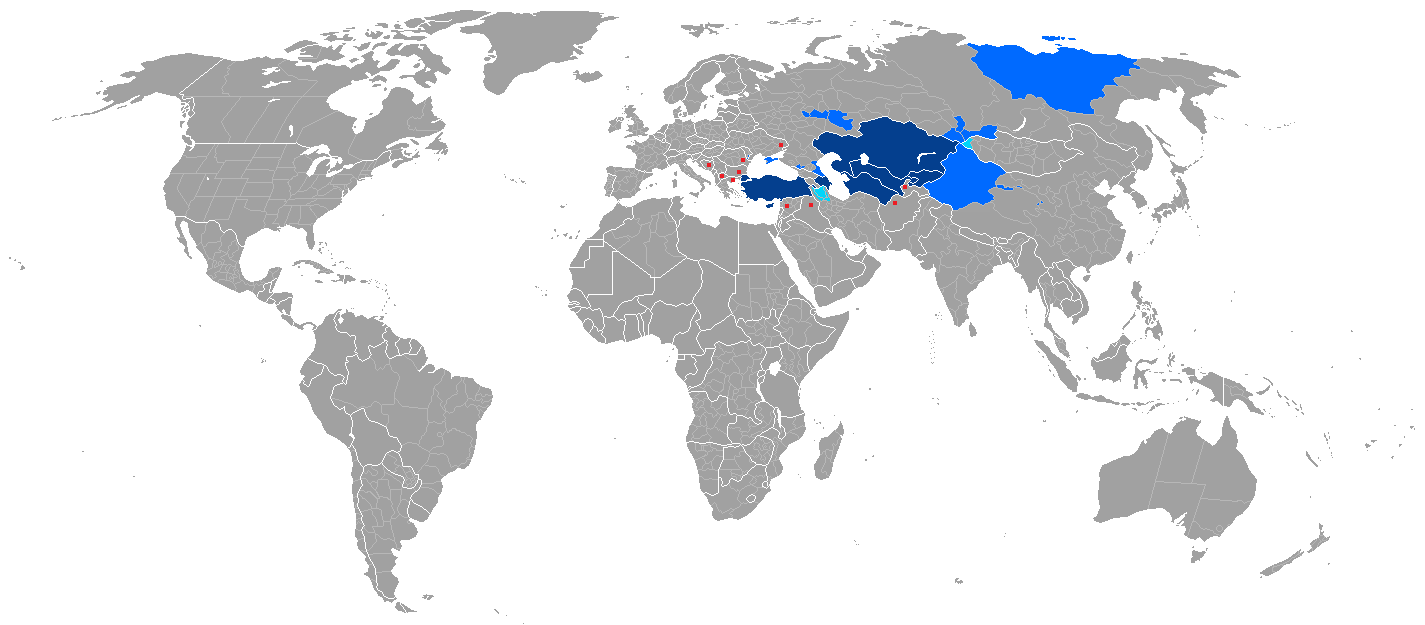
Map showing countries and autonomous subdivisions where a language belonging to the Turkic language family has official status

Turkic languages are null-subject languages, have vowel harmony (with the notable exception of Uzbek due to strong Persian-Tajik influence), converbs, extensive agglutination by means of suffixes and postpositions, and lack of grammatical articles, noun classes, and grammatical gender. Subject–object–verb word order is universal within the family. In terms of the level of vowel harmony in the Turkic language family, Tuvan is characterized as almost fully harmonic whereas Uzbek is the least harmonic or not harmonic at all. Taking into account the documented historical-linguistic development of Turkic languages overall, both inscriptional and textual, the family provides over one millennium of documented stages as well as scenarios in the linguistic evolution of vowel harmony which, in turn, demonstrates harmony evolution along a confidently definable trajectory Though vowel harmony is a common characteristic of major language families spoken in Inner Eurasia (Mongolic, Tungusic, Uralic and Turkic), the type of harmony found in them differs from each other; specifically, Uralic and Turkic have a shared type of vowel harmony (called palatal vowel harmony) whereas Mongolic and Tungusic represent a different type.

== History ==
=== Pre-history ===
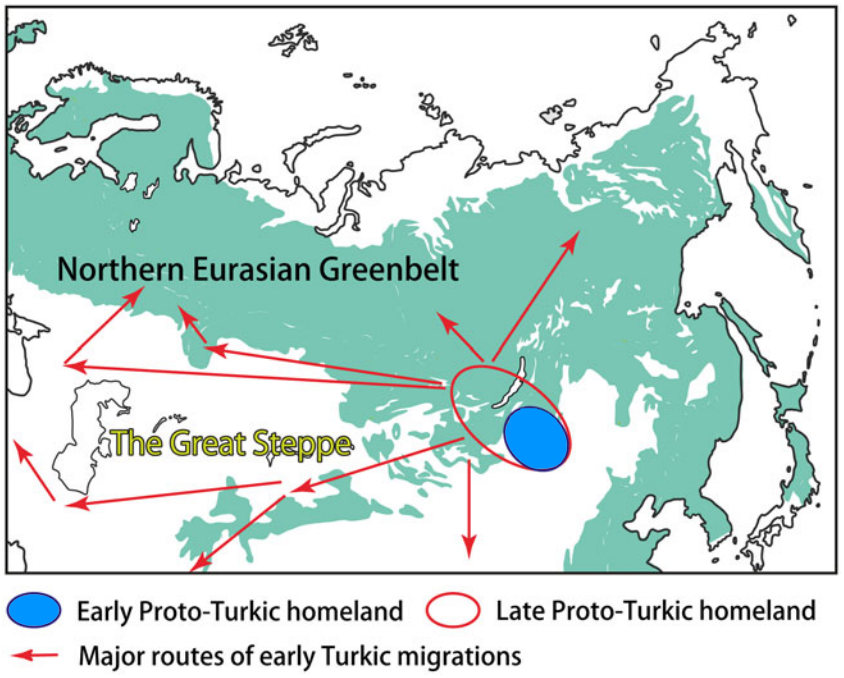
Proto-Turkic homeland and expansion.

The homeland of the Turkic peoples and their language is suggested to be somewhere between the Transcaspian steppe and Northeastern Asia (Manchuria), with genetic evidence pointing to the region near South Siberia and Mongolia as the "Inner Asian Homeland" of the Turkic ethnicity. Similarly several linguists, including Juha Janhunen, Roger Blench and Matthew Spriggs, suggest that modern-day Mongolia is the homeland of the Proto-Turkic language. Relying on Proto-Turkic lexical items about the climate, topography, flora, fauna, people's modes of subsistence, Turkologist Peter Benjamin Golden locates the Proto-Turkic Urheimat either in the southern, taiga-steppe zone of the Sayan-Altay region, or from Lake Baikal to eastern Mongolia.

Extensive contact took place between Proto-Turks and Proto-Mongols approximately during the first millennium BC; the shared cultural tradition between the two Eurasian nomadic groups is called the "Turco-Mongol" tradition. The two groups shared a similar religion system, Tengrism, and there exists a multitude of evident loanwords between Turkic languages and Mongolic languages. Although the loans were bidirectional, today Turkic loanwords constitute the largest foreign component in Mongolian vocabulary.

Some lexical and extensive typological similarities between Turkic and the nearby Tungusic and Mongolic families, as well as the Korean and Japonic families has in more recent years been instead attributed to prehistoric contact amongst the group, sometimes referred to as the Northeast Asian sprachbund. A more recent (circa first millennium BC) contact between "core Altaic" (Turkic, Mongolic, and Tungusic) is distinguished from this, due to the existence of definitive common words that appear to have been mostly borrowed from Turkic into Mongolic, and later from Mongolic into Tungusic, as Turkic borrowings into Mongolic significantly outnumber Mongolic borrowings into Turkic, and Turkic and Tungusic do not share any words that do not also exist in Mongolic.

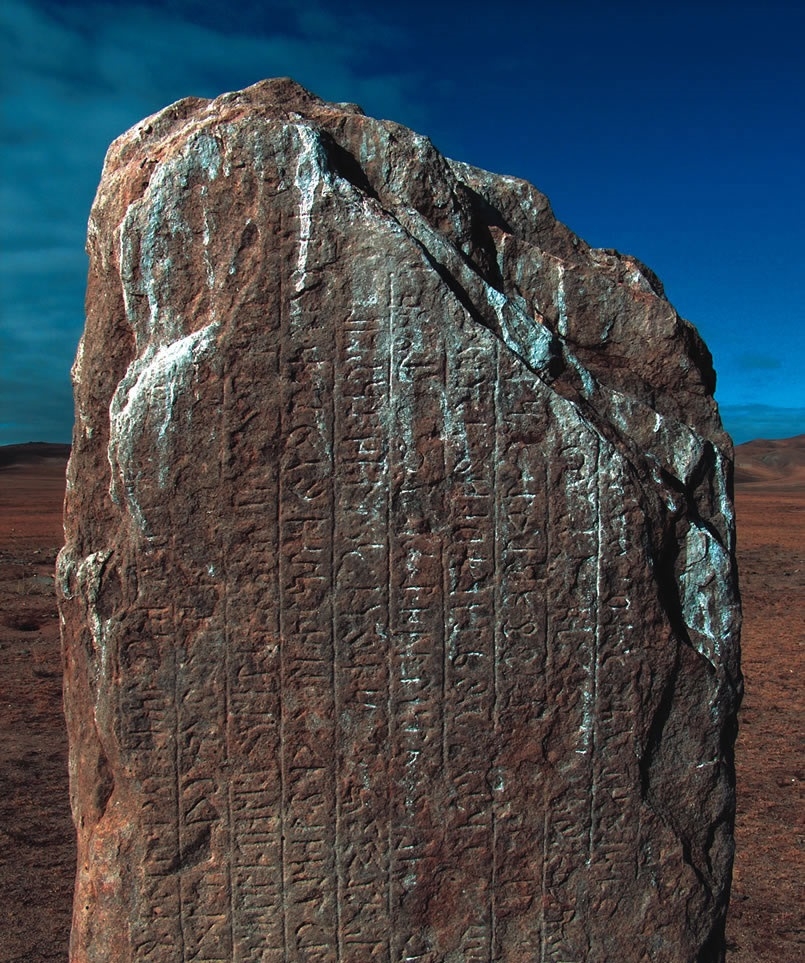
Old Turkic Kul-chur inscription with the Old Turkic alphabet (c. 8th century). Töv Province, Mongolia

Turkic languages also show some Chinese loanwords that point to early contact during the time of Proto-Turkic.

=== Early written records ===
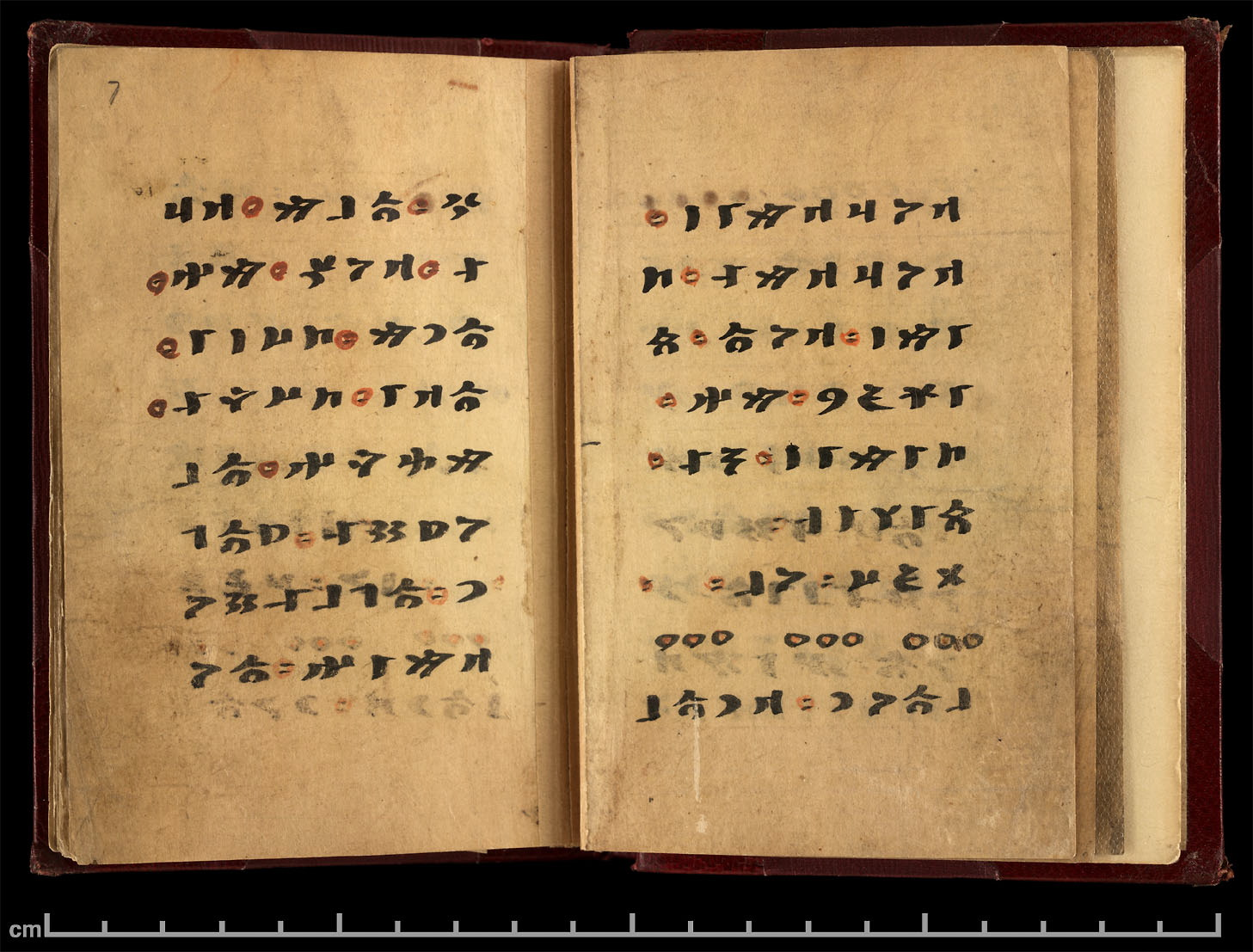
The 9th-century Irk Bitig ("Book of Divination") from Dunhuang, written in Old Uyghur language with the Orkhon script, is an important literary source for early Turko-Mongol mythology.

The first established records of the Turkic languages are the Orkhon inscriptions by the Göktürks, recording the Old Turkic language, which were discovered in 1889 in the Orkhon Valley in Mongolia, and are dated to the eighth century AD. The Compendium of the Turkic Dialects (Divânü Lügati't-Türk), written during the 11th century AD by Kaşgarlı Mahmud of the Kara-Khanid Khanate, constitutes an early linguistic treatment of the family. The Compendium is the first comprehensive dictionary of the Turkic languages and also includes the first known map of the Turkic speakers' geographical distribution. It mainly pertains to the Southwestern branch of the family.

The Codex Cumanicus (12th–13th centuries AD) concerning the Northwestern branch is another early linguistic manual, between the Kipchak language and Latin, used by the Catholic missionaries sent to the Western Cumans inhabiting a region corresponding to present-day Hungary and Romania. The earliest records of the language spoken by Volga Bulgars, debatably the parent or a distant relative of Chuvash language, are dated to the 13th–14th centuries AD.

=== Geographical expansion and development ===
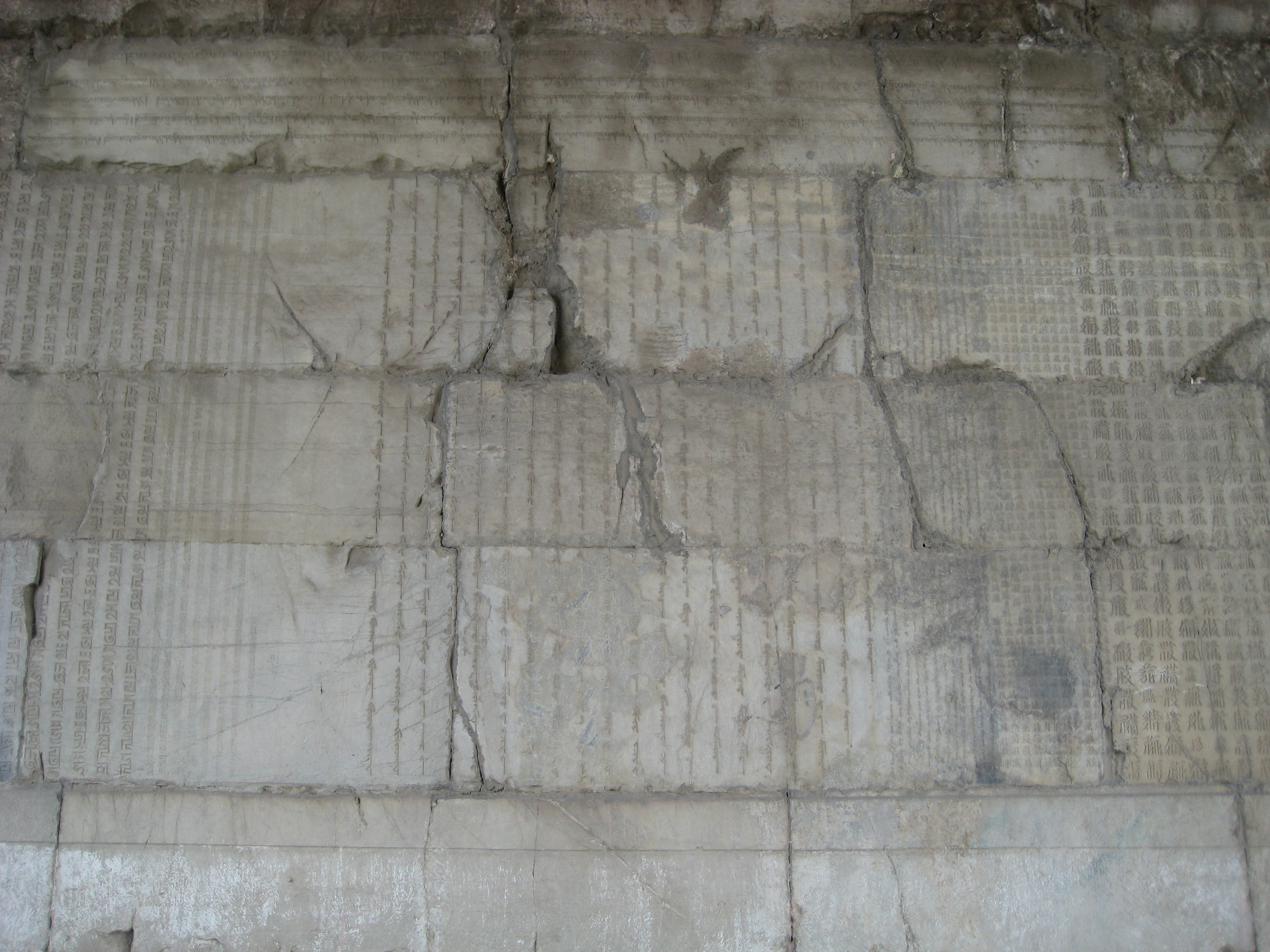
Yuan dynasty Buddhist inscription written in Old Uyghur language with Old Uyghur alphabet on the east wall of the Cloud Platform at Juyong Pass

With the Turkic expansion during the Early Middle Ages (c. 6th–11th centuries AD), Turkic languages, in the course of just a few centuries, spread across Central Asia, from Siberia to the Mediterranean. Various terminologies from the Turkic languages have passed into Persian, Urdu, Ukrainian, Russian, Chinese, Mongolian, Hungarian and to a lesser extent, Arabic.

The geographical distribution of Turkic-speaking peoples across Eurasia since the Ottoman era ranges from the North-East of Siberia to Turkey in the West.

For centuries, the Turkic-speaking peoples have migrated extensively and intermingled continuously, and their languages have been influenced mutually and through contact with the surrounding languages, especially the Iranian, Slavic, and Mongolic languages.

This has obscured the historical developments within each language and/or language group, and as a result, there exist several systems to classify the Turkic languages. The modern genetic classification schemes for Turkic are still largely indebted to Samoilovich (1922).

The Turkic languages may be divided into six branches:

- Turkic
  - Common Turkic
    - Oghuz Turkic (Southwestern)
    - Kipchak Turkic (Northwestern)
    - Karluk Turkic (Southeastern)
    - Siberian Turkic (Northeastern)
    - Arghu Turkic
  - Oghur Turkic

In this classification, Oghur Turkic is also referred to as Lir-Turkic, and the other branches are subsumed under the title of Shaz-Turkic or Common Turkic. It is not clear when these two major types of Turkic can be assumed to have diverged.

With less certainty, the Southwestern, Northwestern, Southeastern and Oghur groups may further be summarized as West Turkic, the Northeastern, Kyrgyz-Kipchak, and Arghu (Khalaj) groups as East Turkic.

Geographically and linguistically, the languages of the Northwestern and Southeastern subgroups belong to the central Turkic languages, while the Northeastern and Khalaj languages are the so-called peripheral languages.

Hruschka, et al. (2014) use computational phylogenetic methods to calculate a tree of Turkic based on phonological sound changes.

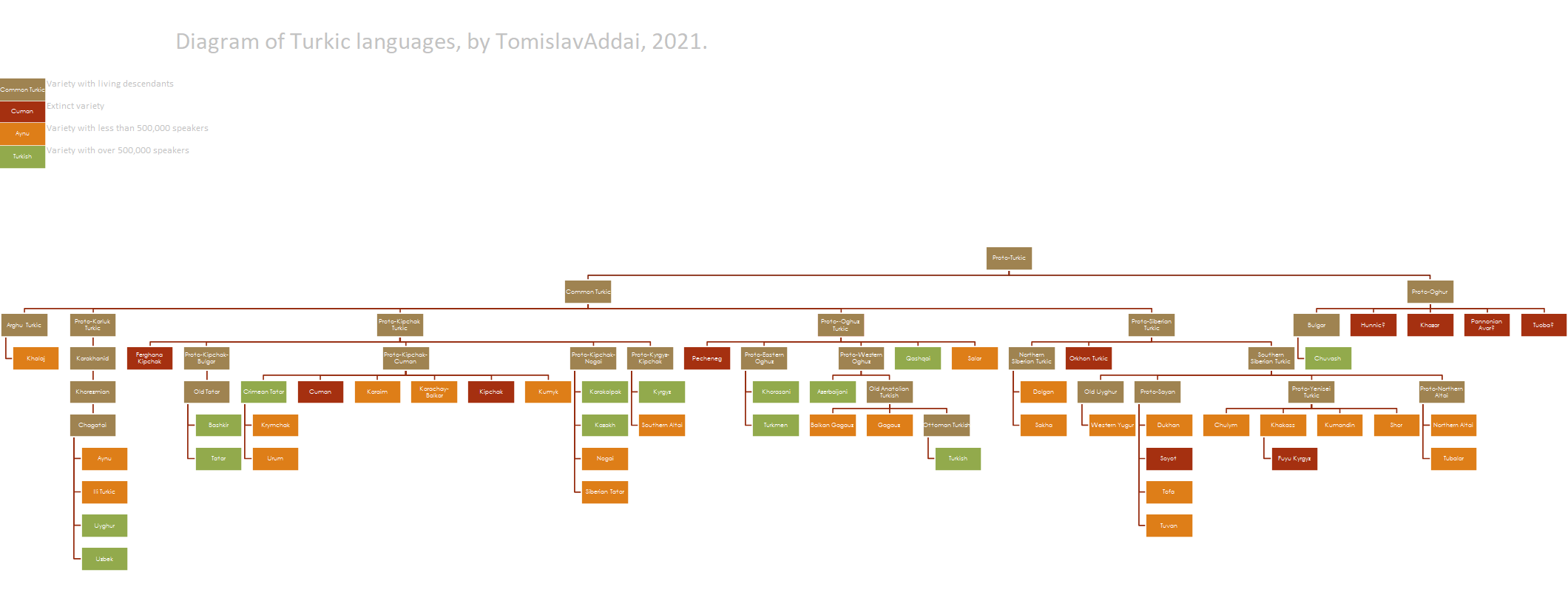
A classification scheme of all the Turkic languages

=== Schema ===
The following isoglosses are traditionally used in the classification of the Turkic languages:

- Rhotacism (or in some views, zetacism), e.g. in the last consonant of the word for "nine" *tokkuz. This separates the Oghur branch, which exhibits /r/, from the rest of Turkic, which exhibits /z/. In this case, rhotacism refers to the development of *-/r/, *-/z/, and *-/d/ to /r/,*-/k/,*-/kh/ in this branch. See Antonov and Jacques (2012) on the debate concerning rhotacism and lambdacism in Turkic.
- Intervocalic *d, e.g. the second consonant in the word for "foot" *hadaq
- Suffix-final -G, e.g. in the suffix *lIG, in e.g. *tāglïg

Additional isoglosses include:

- Preservation of word initial *h, e.g. in the word for "foot" *hadaq. This separates Khalaj as a peripheral language.
- Denasalisation of palatal *ń, e.g. in the word for "moon", *āń

Isogloss	Common Turkic																		Oguric
Isogloss	Siberian						Oghuz				Karluk		Kipchak				Sayan	Arghu	Oguric
Isogloss	Old Turkic	Northern Altai	Western Yugur	Khakas	Sakha/Yakut	Fu-yü Gyrgys	Turkish	Turkmen	Azerbaijani	Qashqai	Uzbek	Uyghur	Tatar	Kazakh	Kyrgyz	Southern Altai	Tuvan	Khalaj	Chuvash
z/r (nine)	toquz	toɣïs	toqïs	toɣïs	toɣus	doɣus	dokuz	dokuz	doqquz	doqquz	toʻqqiz	toqquz	tuɣïz	toğyz	toɣuz	toɣus	tos	toqquz	tăχăr
*h- (foot)	adaq	ayaq	azaq	azaq	ataχ	azïχ	ayak	aýak	ayaq	ayaq	oyoq	ayaq	ayaq	aiaq	ayaq	ayak	adaq	hadaq	ura
*VdV (foot)	adaq	ayaq	azaq	azaχ	hadaq	azïχ	ayak	aýak	ayaq	ayaq	oyoq	ayaq	ayaq	aiaq	ayaq	ayak	adaq	hadaq	ura
*-ɣ (mountain)	tāɣ	taɣ	taɣ	taɣ	tıa	daχ	dağ*	dag	dağ	daɣ	togʻ	tagh	taw	tau	tō	tū	daɣ	tāɣ	tu
suffix *-lïɣ (mountainous)	tāɣlïɣ	taɣlïɣ	taɣliɣ	taɣlïɣ	χayalaaχ		dağlı	dagly	dağlı	daɣlïɣ	togʻlik	taghliq	tawlï	tauly	tōlū	tūlu	daɣlïɣ		tullă

*In the standard Istanbul dialect of Turkish, the ğ in dağ and dağlı is not realized as a consonant, but as a slight lengthening of the preceding vowel.

== Members ==
The following table is based mainly upon the classification scheme presented by Lars Johanson.

Proto-Turkic	Common Turkic	Southwestern Common Turkic (Oghuz)			Salar
Proto-Turkic	Common Turkic	Southwestern Common Turkic (Oghuz)	West Oghuz		Ajem-Turkic (extinct); Old Anatolian Turkish (extinct); Ottoman Turkish (replaced by modern Turkish in the early 20th century); Pecheneg (extinct); Turkish; Gagauz; Azerbaijani
Proto-Turkic	Common Turkic	Southwestern Common Turkic (Oghuz)	East Oghuz		Turkmen; Khorasani Turkic
Proto-Turkic	Common Turkic	Southwestern Common Turkic (Oghuz)	South Oghuz		Qashqai; Chaharmahali Turkic; Afshari Turkic; Sonqori Turkic
Proto-Turkic	Common Turkic	Arghu			Khalaj
Proto-Turkic	Common Turkic	Northwestern Common Turkic (Kipchak)			
Proto-Turkic	Common Turkic	Northwestern Common Turkic (Kipchak)	West Kipchak		Kumyk; Karachay-Balkar; Mountain dialect of Crimean Tatar; Urum; Krymchak; Karaim; Cuman (extinct); Mamluk-Kipchak (extinct); Armeno-Kipchak (extinct)
Proto-Turkic	Common Turkic	Northwestern Common Turkic (Kipchak)	North Kipchak (Volga–Ural Turkic)		Tatar; Bashkir; Old Tatar (extinct)
Proto-Turkic	Common Turkic	Northwestern Common Turkic (Kipchak)	South Kipchak (Aralo-Caspian)		Steppe dialect of Crimean Tatar; Dobrujan Tatar; Kazakh; Karakalpak; Nogai; Western Siberian Tatar; Tobol-Irtysh Tatar
Proto-Turkic	Common Turkic	Northwestern Common Turkic (Kipchak)	Eastern Kipchak (Kyrgyz–Kipchak) (Note: Nikolai Baskakov and some others believe that the Kyrgyz–Kipchak subgroup originally belonged to the Siberian group, but was significantly influenced by the Kipchak languages and can now be included in the Kipchak group.)		Kyrgyz (Note: Lars Johanson once considered Kyrgyz language to be a member of South Kipchak.(Johanson 1998)); Fergana Kipchak (extinct); Eastern Siberian Tatar; Baraba Tatar; Tom Tatar; Southern Altai (Note: Nikolai Baskakov and some others considered Southern Altai language to be a member of Kyrgyz-Kipchak subgroup.); Altai proper; Telengit; Teleut
Proto-Turkic	Common Turkic	Southeastern Common Turkic (Karluk)	West Karluk		Uzbek
Proto-Turkic	Common Turkic	Southeastern Common Turkic (Karluk)	East Karluk		Uyghur; Ili Turki; Äynu (Abdal) (Note: Äynu contains a very large Persian vocabulary component, and is spoken exclusively by adult men, almost as a cryptolect.); Chagatai (extinct); Khorezmian Turkic (extinct); Karakhanid (extinct)
Proto-Turkic	Common Turkic	Northeastern Common Turkic (Siberian)	North Siberian		Yakut (Sakha); Dolgan
Proto-Turkic	Common Turkic	Northeastern Common Turkic (Siberian)	South Siberian (Note: Lars Johanson once classified South Siberian group into 4 subgroups (Sayan Turkic, Yenisei Turkic, Chulym Turkic and Altai Turkic). Sayan Turkic consisted of Tuvan (Soyot, Uriankhai) and Tofa (Karagas). Yenisei Turkic consisted of Khakas, Shor and related dialects (Saghay, Qaca, Qizil). Chulym Turkic consisted of dialects such as Küerik. Altai Turkic consisted of Altay (Oirot) and dialects such as Tuba, Qumanda, Qu, Teleut, Telengit. (Johanson 1998))	Sayan Turkic	Tuvan; Tofa; Soyot-Tsaatan (extinct, partly revitalized); Dukhan
Proto-Turkic	Common Turkic	Northeastern Common Turkic (Siberian)	South Siberian	Altai and Yenisei Turkic	Chulym; Fuyu Kyrgyz (Note: According to Lars Johanson, Fuyu Kyrgyz is considered to be closely related to Khakas.); Khakas; Northern Altai; Kumandin; Chelkan; Tubalar; Shor
Proto-Turkic	Common Turkic	Northeastern Common Turkic (Siberian)	South Siberian		Western Yugur; Orkhon Turkic (extinct); Old Uyghur (extinct)
Proto-Turkic	Oghuric				Chuvash; Khazar (extinct); Bulgar (extinct)

== Vocabulary comparison ==
The following is a brief comparison of cognates among the basic vocabulary across the Turkic language family (about 60 words). Despite being cognates, some of the words may denote a different meaning.

Empty cells do not necessarily imply that a particular language is lacking a word to describe the concept, but rather that the word for the concept in that language may be formed from another stem and is not cognate with the other words in the row or that a loanword is used in its place.

Also, there may be shifts in the meaning from one language to another, and so the "Common meaning" given is only approximate. In some cases, the form given is found only in some dialects of the language, or a loanword is much more common (e.g. in Turkish, the preferred word for "fire" is the Persian-derived ateş, whereas the native od is not in use in the standard language anymore). Forms are given in native Latin orthographies unless otherwise noted.

	Common meaning	Proto-Turkic	Old Turkic	Turkish	Azerbaijani	Karakhanid	Qashqai	Turkmen	Tatar	Karaim	Bashkir	Kazakh	Kyrgyz	Uzbek	Uyghur	Sakha/Yakut	Chuvash
Relationship	father, ancestor	*ata, *kañ	ata, apa, qañ	baba, ata	baba, ata	apa, ata	bowa/ata	ata	ata, atay (Note: Cyrillic: ата, атай)	ata	ata, atay (Note: Cyrillic: ата, атай)	äke, ata	ata	ota	ata (Note: UEY: ئاتا)	ağa (Note: Cyrillic: аҕа)	atte, aśu, aşşĕ (Note: Cyrillic: атте, аҫу, ашшӗ)
Relationship	mother	*ana, *ög	ana, ög	ana, anne	ana	ana, ene	ana/nänä	ene	ana, äni (Note: Cyrillic: ана, әни)	ana	ana, inä(y)/asay (Note: Cyrillic: ана, инә(й)/асай)	ana, apa, şeşe	ene, ana (Note: Cyrillic: эне, ана)	ona, acha	ana (Note: UEY: ئانا)	iỹe (Note: IPA /ij̃e/. Cyrillic: ийэ. The nasal glide /j̃/ is not distinguished from oral glide /j/ in orthography.)	anne, annü, amăşĕ (Note: Cyrillic: анне, аннӳ, амӑшӗ)
Relationship	son	*ogul	oğul	oğul	oğul	oɣul, ohul	oğul	ogul	ul (Note: Cyrillic: ул)	uvul	ul	ūl (Note: Cyrillic: ұл)	uul (Note: Cyrillic: уул)	oʻgʻil	oghul (Note: UEY: ئوغۇل)	uol (Note: Cyrillic: уол)	ıvăl, ul (Note: Cyrillic: ывӑл, ул)
Relationship	man	*ér, *érkek	er	erkek	ər/erkək	erkek	kiši	erkek	ir (Note: Cyrillic: ир)	ėr	ir, irkäk (Note: Cyrillic: ир, иркәк)	er, erkek (Note: Cyrillic: ер, еркек)	er, erkek (Note: Cyrillic: эр, эркек)	erkak	er (Note: UEY: ئەر)	er (Note: Cyrillic: эр)	ar/arśın (Note: Cyrillic: ар/арҫын)
Relationship	girl	*kíŕ	qız	kız	qız	qɨz	qïz/qez	gyz	qız (Note: Cyrillic: кыз)	qɨz	qıð (Note: Cyrillic: ҡыҙ)	qyz (Note: Cyrillic: қыз)	qız	qiz	qiz (Note: UEY: قىز)	kııs (Note: Cyrillic: кыыс)	hĕr (Note: Cyrillic: хӗр)
Relationship	person	*kiĺi, *yạlaŋuk	kişi, yalañuq	kişi	şəxs, adam	kiši		kişi	keşe (Note: Cyrillic: кеше)	kiši	keşe	kısı (Note: Cyrillic: кісі)	kişi (Note: Cyrillic: киши)	kishi	kishi (Note: UEY: كىشى)	kihi (Note: Cyrillic: киһи)	śın (Note: Cyrillic: ҫын)
Relationship	bride	*gélin	kelin	gelin	gəlin	qalɨŋ	gälin	gelin	kilen (Note: Cyrillic: килен)	kelin	kilen	kelın (Note: Cyrillic: келін)	kelin (Note: Cyrillic: келин)	kelin	kelin (Note: UEY: كەلىن)	kiyiit (Note: Cyrillic: кийиит)	kin (Note: Cyrillic: кин)
Relationship	mother-in-law			kaynana	qaynana		qäynänä	gaýyn ene	qayın ana (Note: Cyrillic: кайын ана)		qäynä (Note: Cyrillic: ҡәйнә)	qaıyn ene (Note: Cyrillic: қайын ене)	qaynene (Note: Cyrillic: кайнене)	qaynona	qeyinana (Note: UEY: قەيىنانا)		huńama (Note: Cyrillic: хунама)
Body parts	heart	*yürek	yürek	yürek	ürək	jürek	iräg/üräg	ýürek	yöräk (Note: Cyrillic: йөрәк)	üriak, jürek	yöräk	jürek (Note: Cyrillic: жүрек)	cürök (Note: Cyrillic: жүрөк)	yurak	yürek	sürex (Note: Cyrillic: сүрэх)	çĕre (Note: Cyrillic: чӗре)
Body parts	blood	*kiān	qan	kan	qan	qan	qan	gan	qan (Note: Cyrillic: кан)	qan	qan (Note: Cyrillic: ҡан)	qan (Note: Cyrillic: қан)	qan	qon	qan	xaan (Note: Cyrillic: хаан)	yun
Body parts	head	*baĺč	baš	baş	baş	baš	baš	baş	baş	baš	baş	bas	baş	bosh	bash	bas	puś/poś
Body parts	hair	*s(i)ač, *kïl	sač, qïl	saç, kıl	saç, qıl	sač, qɨl	tik/qel	saç, gyl	çäç, qıl	čač, sač, qɨl	säs, qıl	şaş, qyl	çaç, qıl	soch, qil	sach, qil	battax, kıl	śüś, hul
Body parts	eye	*göŕ	köz	göz	göz	köz	gez/göz	göz	küz	kioź, goz	küð	köz	köz	koʻz	köz	xarax, kös	kuś/koś
Body parts	eyelash	*kirpik	kirpik	kirpik	kirpik	kirpik	kirpig	kirpik	kerfek	kirpik	kerpek	kırpık	kirpik	kiprik	kirpik	kılaman, kirbii	hărpăk
Body parts	ear	*kulkak	qulqaq	kulak	qulaq	qulaq, qulqaq, qulxaq, qulɣaq	qulaq	gulak	qolaq	qulax	qolaq	qūlaq	qulaq	quloq	qulaq	kulgaax	hălha
Body parts	nose	*burun	burun	burun	burun	burun	burn	burun	borın	burun	moron	mūryn	murun	burun	burun	murun, munnu	murun
Body parts	arm	*kol	qol	kol	qol	qol	qol	gol	qul	kol	qul	qol	qol	qoʻl	qol	хol	hul
Body parts	hand	*el-ig	elig	el	əl	elig	äl	el				alaqan	alaqan	ilik	ilik	ilii	ală
Body parts	finger	*erŋek, *biarŋak	erŋek	parmak	barmaq	barmaq	burmaq	barmaq	barmaq	barmax	barmaq	barmaq, sausaq	barmaq	barmoq	barmaq	tarbaq	pürne/porńa
Body parts	fingernail	*dïrŋak	tïrŋaq	tırnak	dırnaq	tɨrŋaq	dïrnaq	dyrnak	tırnaq	tɨrnax	tırnaq	tyrnaq	tırmaq	tirnoq	tirnaq	tıngıraq	çĕrne
Body parts	knee	*dīŕ, *dǖŕ	tiz	diz	diz	tizle-; (to press with one's knees)	diz	dyz	tez	tɨz	teð	tıze	tize	tizza	tiz	tobuk	çĕrśi, çĕrkuśśi
Body parts	calf	*baltïr	baltïr	baldır	baldır	baldɨr	ballïr	baldyr	baltır	baldɨr	baltır	baltyr	baltır	boldir	baldir	ballır	pıl
Body parts	foot	*(h)adak	adaq	ayak	ayaq	aδaq	ayaq	aýak	ayaq	ajax	ayaq	aiaq	but, ayaq	oyoq, adoq	ayaq	ataq	ura
Body parts	belly	*kạrïn	qarïn	karın	qarın	qarɨn	qarn	garyn	qarın	qarɨn	qarın	qaryn	qarın	qorin	qerin	xarın	hırăm
Animals	horse	*(h)at	at	at	at	at	at	at	at	at	at	at	at	ot	at	at	ut/ot
Animals	cattle	*dabar	ingek, tabar	inek, davar, sığır	inək, sığır	ingek, ingen; tavar	seğer	sygyr	sıyır	sɨjɨr	hıyır	siyr, eneke	uy, sıyır, inek	sigir, inak	siyir	ınax	ĕne
Animals	dog	*ït, *köpek	ït	it, köpek	it	ɨt	kepäg	it	et	it´	et	ıt, köpek	it, köbök	it	it	ıt	yıtă
Animals	fish	*bālïk	balïq	balık	balıq	balɨq	balïq	balyk	balıq	balɨx	balıq	balyq	balıq	baliq	beliq	balık	pulă
Animals	louse	*bït	bit	bit	bit	bit	bit	bit	bet	bit	bet	bıt	bit	bit	bit	bıt	pıytă/puťă
Other nouns	house	*eb, *bark	eb, barq	ev, bark	ev	ev	äv	öý	öy	üy, üv	öy	üı	üy	uy	öy		śurt
Other nouns	tent	*otag, *gerekü	otaɣ, kerekü	çadır, otağ	çadır; otaq	otaɣ, kerekü	čador	çadyr; otag	çatır	oda	satır	şatyr, otau	çatır, otoo, otoq	chodir; oʻtoq	chadir; otaq	otuu	çatăr
Other nouns	way	*yōl	yol	yol	yol	jol	yol	ýol	yul	jol	yul	jol	col	yoʻl	yol	suol	śul
Other nouns	bridge	*köprüg	köprüg	köprü	körpü	köprüg		köpri	küper	kiopriu	küper	köpır	köpürö	koʻprik	kövrük	kürpe	kĕper
Other nouns	arrow	*ok	oq	ok	ox	oq	ox/tir	ok	uq	oq	uq	oq	oq	oʻq	oq	ox	uhă
Other nouns	fire	*ōt	ōt	od, ateş (Pers.)	od	ot	ot	ot	ut	ot	ut	ot	ot	oʻt	ot	uot	vut/vot
Other nouns	ash	*kül	kül	kül	kül	kül	kil/kül	kül	köl	kul	köl	kül	kül	kul	kül	kül	kĕl
Other nouns	water	*sub, *sïb	sub	su	su	suv	su	suw	su	su	hıw	su	suu	suv	su	uu	şıv/şu
Other nouns	ship, boat	*gḗmi	kemi	gemi	gəmi	kemi		gämi	köymä	gemi	kämä	keme	keme	kema	keme		kimĕ
Other nouns	lake	*kȫl	köl	göl	göl	köl	göl/gel	köl	kül	giol´	kül	köl	köl	koʻl	köl	küöl	külĕ
Other nouns	sun/day	*güneĺ, *gün	kün	güneş, gün	günəş, gün	kün, qujaš	gin/gün	gün	qoyaş, kön	kujaš	qoyaş, kön	kün	kün	quyosh, kun	quyash, kün	kün	hĕvel, kun
Other nouns	cloud	*bulït	bulut	bulut	bulud	bulut	bulut	bulut	bolıt	bulut	bolot	bult	bulut	bulut	bulut	bılıt	pĕlĕt
Other nouns	star	*yultuŕ	yultuz	yıldız	ulduz	julduz	ulluz	ýyldyz	yoldız	julduz	yondoð	jūldyz	cıldız	yulduz	yultuz	sulus	śăltăr
Other nouns	ground, earth	*toprak	topraq	toprak	torpaq	topraq	torpaq	toprak	tufraq	topraq, toprax	tupraq	topyraq	topuraq	tuproq	tupraq	toburax	tăpra
Other nouns	hilltop	*tepö, *töpö	töpü	tepe	təpə	tepe		depe	tübä	tebe	tübä	töbe	döbö, töbö	tepa	töpe	töbö	tüpĕ
Other nouns	tree/wood	*ïgač	ïɣač	ağaç	ağac	jɨɣač	ağaĵ	agaç	ağaç	ahač	ağas	ağaş, tal, daraq	baq, daraq, cığaç	yogʻoch	yahach	mas	yıvăś
Other nouns	god (Tengri)	*teŋri, *taŋrï	teŋri, burqan	tanrı	tanrı	teŋri	tarï/Allah/Xoda	taňry	täñre	Tieńri	täñre	täñır	teñir	tangri	tengri	tangara	tură/toră
Other nouns	sky	*teŋri, *kȫk	kök, teŋri	gök	göy	kök	gey/göy	gök	kük	kök	kük	kök	kök	koʻk	kök	küöx	kăvak/koak
Adjectives	long	*uŕïn	uzun	uzun	uzun	uzun	uzun	uzyn	ozın	uzun	oðon	ūzyn	uzun	uzun	uzun	uhun	vărăm
Adjectives	new	*yaŋï, *yeŋi	yaŋï	yeni	yeni	jaŋɨ	yeŋi	ýaňy	yaña	jɨŋgɨ	yañı	jaña	cañı	yangi	yengi	saña	śĕnĕ
Adjectives	fat	*semiŕ	semiz	semiz, şişman	səmiz	semiz		semiz	simez	semiz	himeð	semız	semiz	semiz	semiz	emis	samăr
Adjectives	full	*dōlï	tolu	dolu	dolu	tolu	dolu	doly	tulı	tolɨ	tulı	toly, tolyq	toluq, tolu, toluu, tolo	toʻla	toluq	toloru	tulli
Adjectives	white	*āk, *ürüŋ	āq, ürüŋ	ak, beyaz (Ar.)	ağ	aq	aq	ak	aq	aq	aq	aq	aq	oq	aq	ürüñ (үрүҥ)	şură
Adjectives	black	*kara	qara	kara, siyah (Pers.)	qara	qara	qärä	gara	qara	qara	qara	qara	qara	qora	qara	xara	hura, hora
Adjectives	red	*kïŕïl	qïzïl	kızıl, kırmızı (Ar.)	qızıl	qɨzɨl	qïzïl	gyzyl	qızıl	qɨzɨl	qıðıl	qyzyl	qızıl	qizil	qizil	kıhıl	hĕrlĕ
Numbers	1	*bīr	bir	bir	bir	bir	bir	bir	ber	bir, bɨr	ber	bır	bir	bir	bir	biir	pĕrre, pĕr
Numbers	2	*éki	eki	iki	iki	ẹki	ikki	iki	ike	eky	ike	ekı	eki	ikki	ikki	ikki	ikkĕ, ikĕ, ik
Numbers	3	*üč	üč	üç	üç	üč	uǰ, u̇č	üç	öč	üć	ös	üş	üč	uch/u̇č	üch/üç	üs	viśśĕ, viśĕ, viś
Numbers	4	*dȫrt	tört	dört	dörd	tört	derd/dörd	dört	dürt	dört	dürt	tört	tört	toʻrt	tört	tüört	tăvattă, tăvată, tăvat
Numbers	5	*bēĺ(k)	béš	beş	beş	béš		bäş	beş	beš	biš	bes	beş	besh/beş	besh/beş	bies	pillĕk, pilĕk
Numbers	6	*altï	altï	altı	altı	altï	altï	alty (altï)	altï	altï	altï	alty	altı	olti (ålti)	altä	alta	ulttă, ultă, ult
Numbers	7	*yéti	yeti	yedi	yeddi	jeti	yeddi	ýedi	cide	jedi	yete	jetı	ceti	yetti	yetti	sette	śiççĕ, śiçĕ, śiç
Numbers	8	*sekiŕ	säkiz	sekiz	səkkiz	sek(k)iz, sik(k)iz	sӓkkiz	sekiz	sigez	sekiz	higeð	segız	segiz	säkkiz	säkkiz	aɣïs	sakkăr, sakăr
Numbers	9	*tokuŕ	toquz	dokuz	doqquz	toquz	doġġuz	dokuz	tugïz	toɣuz	tuɣïð	toğyz	toğuz	to'qqiz	toqquz	toɣus	tăxxăr, tăxăr
Numbers	10	*ōn	on	on	on	on	on	on	un	on	un	on	on	oʻn	on	uon	vunnă, vună, vun
Numbers	20	*yẹgirmi	yigirmi/yégirmi	yirmi	iyirmi	yigirmi, yigirme	igirmi, iyirmi	yigrimi	yegerme	yigirmi	yegerme	jiyrma	cıyırma	yigirmä	yigirmä	süürbe	śirĕm
Numbers	30	*otuŕ	otuz	otuz	otuz	otuz	ottiz	otuz (otuð)	otuz	otuz	utïð	otyz	otuz	o'ttiz	ottuz	otut	vătăr
Numbers	40	*kïrk	qïrq	kırk	qırx	qïrq	ġèrḫ (ɢərx)	kyrk (kïrk)	qırq (qïrq)	kïrx	qïrq	qyryq	qırq	qirq	qirq	tüört uon	xĕrĕx
Numbers	50	*ellig	älig	elli	ǝlli (älli)	el(l)ig	älli, ẹlli	elli	ille			elu	elüü				allă, ală, al
Numbers	60	*altmïĺ	altmïš	altmış	altmış (altmïš)	altmïš	altmïš	altmyş (altmïš)	altmïš	altïmïš	altïmïš	alpys	altımış	oltmish (åltmiš)	altmiš	alta uon	ultmăl
Numbers	70	*yẹtmiĺ	yētmiš/s	yetmiş	yetmiş	yetmiš	yetmiš	ýetmiş (yetmiš)	ǰitmeš	yetmiš/s	yetmeš	jetpıs	cetimiş	yetmiš	yätmiš	sette uon	śitmĕl
Numbers	80	*sekiŕ ōn	säkiz on	seksen	sǝksǝn (säksän)	seksün	sӓɣsen	segsen	seksen	seksen, seksan	hikhen	seksen	seksen	sakson (säksån)	säksän	aɣïs uon	sakăr vunnă, sakăr vun
Numbers	90	*dokuŕ ōn	toquz on	doksan	doxsan	toqsan		togsan	tuksan	toksan, toxsan	tukhan	toqsan	toqson	to'qson (tȯksån)	toqsan	toɣus uon	tăxăr vunnă, tăxăr vun
Numbers	100	*yǖŕ	yüz	yüz	yüz	jüz	iz/yüz	ýüz	yöz	jiz, juz, jüz	yöð	jüz	cüz	yuz	yüz	süüs	śĕr
Numbers	1000	*bïŋ	bïŋ	bin	min	miŋ, men	min	müň (müŋ)	meŋ	min, bin	meŋ	myñ	miñ	ming (miŋ)	miŋ	tïhïïnča	pin
	Common meaning	Proto-Turkic	Old Turkic	Turkish	Azerbaijani	Karakhanid	Qashqai	Turkmen	Tatar	Karaim	Bashkir	Kazakh	Kyrgyz	Uzbek	Uyghur	Sakha/Yakut	Chuvash

Azerbaijani "ǝ" and "ä": IPA /æ/

Azerbaijani "q": IPA /g/, word-final "q": IPA /x/

Turkish and Azerbaijani "ı", Karakhanid "ɨ", Turkmen "y", and Sakha "ï": IPA /ɯ/

Turkmen "ň", Karakhanid "ŋ": IPA /ŋ/

Turkish and Azerbaijani "y", Turkmen "ý" and "j" in other languages: IPA /j/

All "ş" and "š" letters: IPA /ʃ/

All "ç" and "č" letters: IPA /t͡ʃ/

Kyrgyz "c": IPA /d͡ʒ/

Kazakh "j": IPA /ʒ/

== Other possible relations ==
The Turkic language family is currently regarded as one of the world's primary language families. Turkic is one of the main members of the controversial Altaic language family, but Altaic currently lacks support from a majority of linguists. None of the theories linking Turkic languages to other families have a wide degree of acceptance at present. Shared features with languages grouped together as Altaic have been interpreted by most mainstream linguists to be the result of a sprachbund.

=== Rejected or controversial theories ===
==== Korean ====
The possibility of a genetic relation between Turkic and Koreanic, independently from Altaic, is suggested by some linguists. Baris Kabak (2006) of the University of Würzburg states that Turkic and Korean share similar phonology as well as morphology.| Li Yong-Sŏng (2014) suggest that there are several cognates between Turkic and Old Korean. He states that these supposed cognates can be useful to reconstruct the early Turkic language. According to him, words related to nature, earth and ruling but especially to the sky and stars seem to be cognates.

The linguist Choi suggested already in 1996 a close relationship between Turkic and Korean regardless of any Altaic connections:

In addition, the fact that the morphological elements are not easily borrowed between languages, added to the fact that the common morphological elements between Korean and Turkic are not less numerous than between Turkic and other Altaic languages, strengthens the possibility that there is a close genetic affinity between Korean and Turkic.

— Choi Han-Woo, A Comparative Study of Korean and Turkic (Hoseo University)

Many historians also point out a close non-linguistic relationship between Turkic peoples and Koreans. Especially close were the relations between the Göktürks and Goguryeo.

==== Uralic ====
Some linguists suggested a relation to Uralic languages, especially to the Ugric languages. This view is rejected and seen as obsolete by mainstream linguists. Similarities are because of language contact and borrowings mostly from Turkic into Ugric languages. Stachowski (2015) states that any relation between Turkic and Uralic must be a contact one.

== See also ==
- Altaic languages
- List of Turkic languages
- List of Turkic-languages poets
- List of Ukrainian words of Turkic origin
- Middle Turkic languages
- Old Turkic
- Old Turkic script
- Proto-Turkic language

== Sources ==
- Akhatov G. Kh. 1960. "About the stress in the language of the Siberian Tatars in connection with the stress of modern Tatar literary language" .- Sat *"Problems of Turkic and the history of Russian Oriental Studies." Kazan. (in Russian)
- Akhatov G.Kh. 1963. "Dialect West Siberian Tatars" (monograph). Ufa. (in Russian)
- Baskakov, N. A. (1962, 1969). Introduction to the study of the Turkic languages. Moscow. (in Russian)
- Boeschoten, Hendrik & Lars Johanson. 2006. Turkic languages in contact. Turcologica, Bd. 61. Wiesbaden: Harrassowitz. ISBN 3-447-05212-0
- Clausen, Gerard. 1972. An etymological dictionary of pre-thirteenth-century Turkish. Oxford: Oxford University Press.
- Deny, Jean et al. 1959–1964. Philologiae Turcicae Fundamenta. Wiesbaden: Harrassowitz.
- Dolatkhah, Sohrab. 2016. Parlons qashqay. In: collection "parlons". Paris: L'Harmattan.
- Dolatkhah, Sohrab. 2016. Le qashqay: langue turcique d'Iran. CreateSpace Independent Publishing Platform (online).
- Dolatkhah, Sohrab. 2015. Qashqay Folktales. CreateSpace Independent Publishing Platform (online).
- Johanson, Lars & Éva Agnes Csató (ed.). 2022. The Turkic Languages. Second edition. London: Routledge. ISBN 978-0-415-73856-9.
- Johanson, Lars. 1998. "Turkic languages." In: Encyclopædia Britannica. CD 98. Encyclopædia Britannica Online, 5 September 2007. Archived 23 June 2008 at the Wayback Machine
- Menges, K. H. 1968. The Turkic languages and peoples: An introduction to Turkic studies. Wiesbaden: Harrassowitz.
- Öztopçu, Kurtuluş. 1996. Dictionary of the Turkic languages: English, Azerbaijani, Kazakh, Kyrgyz, Tatar, Turkish, Turkmen, Uighur, Uzbek. London: Routledge. ISBN 0-415-14198-2
- Samoilovich, A. N. 1922. Some additions to the classification of the Turkish languages. Petrograd.
- Savelyev, Alexander and Martine Robbeets. (2019). lexibank/savelyevturkic: Turkic Basic Vocabulary Database (Version v1.0) [Data set]. Zenodo. doi:10.5281/zenodo.3556518
- Schönig, Claus. 1997–1998. "A new attempt to classify the Turkic languages I-III." Turkic Languages 1:1.117–133, 1:2.262–277, 2:1.130–151.
- Schönig, Claus. "The Internal Division of Modern Turkic and Its Historical Implications". In: Acta Orientalia Academiae Scientiarum Hungaricae, vol. 52, no. 1, 1999, pp. 63–95. JSTOR, http://www.jstor.org/stable/43391369 Archived 3 January 2023 at the Wayback Machine. Accessed 3 January 2023.
- Starostin, Sergei A., Anna V. Dybo, and Oleg A. Mudrak. 2003. Etymological Dictionary of the Altaic Languages. Leiden: Brill. ISBN 90-04-13153-1
- Uchiyama, Junzo; Gillam, J. Christopher; Savelyev, Alexander; Ning, Chao (2020). "Populations dynamics in Northern Eurasian forests: a long-term perspective from Northeast Asia". Evolutionary Human Sciences. 2: 11. doi:10.1017/ehs.2020.11. ISSN 2513-843X. PMC 10427466.
- Voegelin, C.F. & F.M. Voegelin. 1977. Classification and index of the World's languages. New York: Elsevier.
