= Chelkan language =

Turkic language

Chelkan
- Kuu-Kizhi, Chalkan
- куу, къуу, чалкъанду, шалкъанду
- Native to: Russia
- Region: Altai Republic
- Ethnicity: Chelkans
- Native speakers: 648 (2021)
- Language family: Turkic: Siberian Turkic; Southern Siberian; Northern Altai; Chelkan
- Writing system: Cyrillic script

Language codes
- ISO 639-3: –
- Glottolog: chel1242
- A map of the Altai languages, including Chelkan (in red).

Chelkan (also Chalkan, Chalqandu) is a Turkic language spoken in the Altai Republic in Russia by 648 Chelkans.

== The Chelkans ==
The Chelkans are sometimes called "Lebeds" (Russian: Лебедины, Lebediny), of the name of the river which runs through the Altai Republic, or Qu'Kiji. In the 2002 Russian census, their population rose to 855 people.

== Classification ==
Chelkan is classified in the Siberian Turkic languages. It is considered to be a dialect of Northern Altai. The Chelkan, aside from knowing Chelkan, can also understand Tubalar and Kumandin, which comprise the Northern Altai language.

== Phonology ==
=== Consonants ===
The word-final guttural phonemes of Chelkan are more stable than in literary Altai, for example Chelkan таг versus literary туу 'mountain'.

Consonants in Chelkan
		Labial	Alveolar	Postalveolar	Palatal	Velar	Uvular	Pharyngeal
Nasal		m	n		ɲ	ŋ		
Stop	voiceless	p	t			k	/q/	
Stop	voiced		d			/g/		
Fricative	voiceless		s	ʃ				/ħ/
Fricative	voiced	β	z	ʒ		ɣ		
Approximant		w	l		j			
Vibrant			r					

=== Vowels ===
Chelkan has vowel harmony.

Vowels of Chelkan
	Front				Back			
	unrounded		rounded		unrounded		rounded	
	short	long	short	long	short	long	short	long
Close	i	iː	ʏ	ʏː	ɪ	ɪː	ʊ	ʊː
Close	e	eː						
Mid			œ	œː			ɔ	ɔː
Open							ɑ	ɑː

== Orthography ==
In 2008, an alphabet was created for the Chelkan language. However, only one textbook has been published, "Аба-jыштың-аң-куштары" (Animals and Birds of Primeval Taiga), in 2004.

А а	Б б	В в	Г г	Ӷ ӷ	Д д	Ј ј	Е е	Ё ё	Ж ж
З з	И и	Й й	К к	Л л	М м	Н н	Ң ң	О о	Ӧ ӧ
П п	Р р	С с	Т т	У у	Ӱ ӱ	Ф ф	Х х	Ц ц	Ч ч
Ш ш	Щ щ	Ъ ъ	Ы ы	Ь ь	Э э	Ю ю	Я я

In 2017-18, the alphabet was modified with the addition of the letter Њ њ.

А а	Б б	В в	Г г	Ғ ғ	Д д	Ј ј	Е е	Ё ё	Ж ж
З з	И и	Й й	К к	Қ қ	Л л	М м	Н н	Ҥ ҥ	Њ њ
О о	Ӧ ӧ	П п	Р р	С с	Т т	У у	Ӱ ӱ	Ф ф	Х х
Ц ц	Ч ч	Ш ш	Щ щ	Ъ ъ	Ы ы	Ь ь	Э э	Ю ю	Я я

== Sources ==
- (ru) Баскаков, Н.A., Диалект чернёвых татар (туба-кижи), Северные диалекты алтаиского (ойротского) языка, 2 volumes, Moscou, Nauka, 1965–1966.
