= Kumandin language =

Turkic language

Kumandin
- къуманды, къубанды, къуўанды, къувандыг
- Native to: Russia
- Region: Altai Republic, Altai Krai
- Ethnicity: Kumandins
- Native speakers: 654 (2021)
- Language family: Turkic: Common Turkic; Siberian Turkic; South Siberian; Yenisei Turkic; Northern Altai; Kumandin
- Writing system: Cyrillic, Latin (formerly)

Language codes
- ISO 639-3: –
- Glottolog: kuma1284
- ELP: Kumandin
- A map of the Altai languages, including Kumandin (in blue).

The Kumandin language is a Turkic language spoken in the Altai Republic in Russia, spoken by the Kumandins, who name themselves "Kumandi-Kiji". It was formerly counted as a dialect of Altai, but it is more modernly seen as a separate language, with differing curricula from it and Chelkan, which also comprises the Northern Altai language.

== Classification ==
Kumandin is classed in the Siberian Turkic branch of the Turkic languages. It is considered as a dialect of Northern Altai. The Kumandin subgroup of the Altai can understand Tubalar and Chelkan, aside from Kumandin.

== Phonology ==
=== Consonants ===
Kumandin consonants
		Labial	Dental/ Alveolar	Palatal (-alveolar)	Velar
Nasal		m	n	ɲ	ŋ
Stop	plain	p	t		k
Stop	long	pː	tː		kː
Fricative	voiceless		s	ʃ	
Fricative	voiced				ɣ
Affricate				t͡ʃ	
Approximant			l	j	
Trill			r		

=== Vowels ===
Kumandin vowels
	Front		Back	
	unrounded	rounded	unrounded	rounded
High	i, iː	y, yː	ɯ, ɯː	u, uː
Low	ɛ, ɛː	œ, œː	ɑ, ɑː	ɒ, ɒː

== Orthography ==
During the Latinisation period in the Soviet Union, a Latin-based script was developed for the Kumandin language. It was used from 1932 to 1939, when teaching in Kumandin was stopped.

A a	B ʙ	C c	D d	E e	F f	G g	I i
J j	K k	L l	M m	N n	Ꞑ ꞑ	O o	Ɵ ɵ
P p	R r	S s	Ş ş	T t	U u	V v	X x
Y y	Z z	Ƶ ƶ	Ь ь

In recent years, the Kumandin language is being written again. The orthography below was created in 2005, when it was published for use by children.

А а	Б б	В в	Г г	Ғ ғ	Д д	Е е	Ё ё
Ж ж	З з	И и	Й й	К к	Л л	М м	Н н
Ҥ ҥ	Нь нь	О о	Ö ö	П п	Р р	С с	Т т
У у	Ӱ ӱ	Ф ф	Х х	Ц ц	Ч ч	Ш ш	Щ щ
Ъ ъ	Ы ы	Ь ь	Э э	Ю ю	Я я

== Grammar ==
=== Pronouns ===
The pronouns of Kumandin are as follows:

Personal pronouns in Qumandin
	Singular	Plural
1st person	мен men I	пис pis we
2nd person	сен sen you (singular)	снер sner you (plural, formal)
3rd person	ол ol he/she/it	анар anar they

== Bibliography ==
- (ru) Баскаков, Н.A., Диалект чернёвых татар (туба-кижи), Северные диалекты алтаиского (ойротского) языка, 2 volumes, Moscow, Nauka, 1965-1966.
