= List of Ukrainian words of Turkic origin =

This is a partial list of Ukrainian words of Turkic origin.

- майдан: public square; from a Turkic language, compare Turkish meydan = square, ultimately from Persian and Arabic الميدان
- лелека: stork; Ottoman Turkish leylek = stork, from Persian لک‌لک
- беркут: golden eagle; from a Turkic source; compare Kazakh бүркіт, Tatar бөркет, etc.
- баклажан: eggplant; via Ottoman Turkish from Persian بادنجان
- карий: brown, hazel; from a Turkic source, possibly Bulgarian *kar; compare Turkish kara = black
- торба: pouch, bag; from torba = bag, sack
- кизил: cornel, dogwood, From Proto-Turkic *kïŕïl (“red”), compare Turkish kızılcık = cornel
- чабан: shepherd; from çoban= shepherd, from Persian چوپان
- гайдамак: 18th century peasant rebel in Ukraine; another meaning is brigand (highway robber); related to Turkish haydamak = to herd animals
- килим: carpet; from kilim = carpet
- кавун: watermelon; from kavun = melon
- гарбуз: pumpkin; via a Turkic language from Persian خربزه (melon)
- йогурт: yogurt; from yoğurt = yogurt
- тютюн: tobacco; from tütün = tobacco
- туман: fog; from a Turkic source, compare Turkish duman = smoke, fog, Kazakh тұман = mist, fog, Tatar томан = fog, mist
