= Chelkans =

Чалканду, Шалканду Chalkandu, Shalkandu

Regions with significant populations
- Russia: Altai Republic: 1,181

Languages
- Northern Altai (Chelkan), Altai, Russian

Religion
- Russian Orthodox, Burkhanism, shamanism

Related ethnic groups
- Khakas, Kumandins, Shors, Teleuts, Siberian Tatars

The Chelkans (native name—Chalkandu, Shalkandu) are a small group of Turkic Indigenous people of Siberia. They speak the Northern Altai Chelkan language. Those residing in Altai Republic are sometimes grouped together with the Altai ethnic group and those in Kemerovo Oblast are grouped with the Shors; however, they are recognized as a separate ethnic group within the list of Indigenous small-numbered peoples of the North, Siberia and the Far East by ethnographers and the Resolution of the Government of the Russian Federation No. 255 dated March 24, 2000, and Russian Census (2002). But, during the 2010 census, they were again "united" with the Altaians. According to the 2010 census, there were 1,181 Chelkans in Russia.

== History ==
The Chelkans emerged from the mixing of Turkic clans with Ket, Samoyed, and other native Siberian groups. This was a process that began as early as the period when the Yenisei Kygryz dominated the region. The Mongols then ruled over the region and people from the 13th to 18th centuries. The Dzungars then briefly controlled the area until the Chelkans (along with other Altaians) submitted to the Russians.

== Language ==
The Chelkans speak the Chelkan language sometimes classified as a dialect of Northern Altai. The language was counted as separate in the 2002 Russian Census but not the 2010 census which counted 2000 speakers, a writing system was developed in 2014.

== Culture ==
The Chelkans originally mainly hunted local animals, who were vital to their subsistence lifestyle. Around the 19th century, the Chelkans took up cedar nut picking as an additional economic activity.

The Chelkans traditional dwellings included polygonal yurts made out of bark or log and topped with a conic bark roof. Other types of dwellings also included conic yurts made out of bark or perches.

Traditional Chelkan dress included short breeches, linen shirts, and single-breasted robes.

== Religion ==
Most modern Chelkans are Orthodox Christian. However, Burkhanism and shamanism is also found among the Chelkans.
