= Chude (disambiguation) =

Chude or Chud is a historical term for several Baltic Finnic peoples.

Chude may also refer to:

- Chude Jideonwo, Nigerian TV host, filmmaker and media entrepreneur
- Chude Pam Allen, American activist of the civil rights movement and women's liberation movement
- Chude, Poland, village in Poland

== See also ==
- Chud (disambiguation)
