= Northern Altai language =

Siberian Turkic language of the Altai Republic, Russia

Northern Altai
- тӱндӱк алтай тили, tündük altay tili
- Native to: Russia
- Region: Altai Republic; Altai Krai
- Ethnicity: Northern Altai
- Native speakers: 57,000 (2010)
- Language family: Turkic: Common Turkic; Siberian Turkic; South Siberian; Yenisei Turkic; Northern Altai
- Dialects: Kumandy; Chelkan; ?Tubalar
- Writing system: Cyrillic

Language codes
- ISO 639-3: atv
- Glottolog: nort2686
- ELP: Northern Altai
- Map showing the locations of the Northern and Southern Altai varieties in Russia

Northern Altai or Northern Altay is a collective name for a grouping of three moribund Turkic dialects spoken in the Altai Republic of Russia. Though traditionally considered one language, Southern and Northern Altai are not fully mutually intelligible. Written Altai is based on Southern Altai, and is rejected by Northern Altai children.

Northern Altai is written in Cyrillic. In 2006, in the Altay kray, an alphabet was created for the Kumandin variety.

== Demographics ==
According to data from the 2002 Russian Census, 65,534 people in Russia stated that they have command of the Altay language. Only around 10% of them speak Northern Altay varieties, while the remaining speak Southern Altay varieties. Furthermore, according to some data, only 2% of Altays fluently speak the Altay language.

== Dialects ==
Northern Altay consists of the following varieties:

- Kumandin dialect (also Qubandy/Quwandy). 1,862 Kumandins claim to know their national language, but 1,044 people were registered as knowing Kumandy. Kumandy has the following three sub-varieties:
  - Turačak
  - Solton
  - Starobardinian
- Chelkan dialect (also Kuu/Quu, Chalkandu/Shalkanduu, Lebedin). 466 Chelkans claim to speak their national language, and 539 people in all claim to know Chelkan.

The Tubalar language (Tuba) is also often ascribed to belong to the Northern Altai group, but its relation to other languages is dubious and it may belong to the Kipchak languages. 408 Tubalars claim to know their national language, and 436 people in all reported knowing Tuba.

Closely related to the northern varieties of Altay are the Kondoma dialect of the Shor language and the Lower Chulym dialect of the Chulym language.

== Phonology ==
Northern Altai has 8 vowels, which may be long or short, and 20 consonants, plus marginal consonants that occur only in loan words.

=== Vowels ===
Northern Altai vowels
	Front	Back
High	i y	ɯ u
Low	e ø	a o

=== Consonants ===
Northern Altai consonants
	Labial	Alveolar	Post-alveloar	Velar	Uvular
Plosive	p b	t d	c dʒ	k ɡ	q
Affricate		(ts)	c dʒ		
Fricative	f v	s z	ʃ ʒ	(x) ɣ	
Nasal	m	n		ŋ	
Trill		r			
Approximant		l	j		

Phonemes in parentheses occur only in Russian loanwords.

== Linguistic features ==
The following features refer to the outcome of commonly used Turkic isoglosses in Northern Altay.

- */ag/ — Proto-Turkic */ag/ is found in three variations throughout Northern Altay: /u/, /aw/, /aʁ/
- */eb/ — Proto-Turkic */eb/ is found as either /yj/ or /yg/, depending on the variety
- */VdV/ — With a few lexical exceptions (likely borrowings), proto-Turkic intervocalic */d/ results in /j/.
