= Tubalar language =

Turkic language

Tubalar
- Туба, Тума
- Native to: Russia
- Region: Altai Republic, Altai Krai
- Ethnicity: Tubalars
- Native speakers: 930 (2020)
- Language family: Turkic: Common Turkic; Kipchak/Siberian Turkic; Kyrgyz-Kipchak/South Siberian; Yenisei Turkic; Northern Altai; Tubalar
- Writing system: Cyrillic

Language codes
- ISO 639-3: –
- Glottolog: tuba1280
- A map of the Altai languages, including Tubalar (in green).

Tuba-Kiji, Tubalar or Tuba is a Turkic language spoken in the Altai Republic in Russia, by the Tuba-Kiji, who are sometimes called "Black Tatars" (Russian: чернёвых татар) or Tubalars.

== Classification ==
The language is classified in the Siberian Turkic languages. It is considered to be a Northern Altai dialect. However, this classification is disputed, and it may be a Kipchak language. The Tubalars, aside from knowing Tubalar, also can understand Chelkan and Kumandin.

== Orthography ==
In 2010, a Russian-Tubalar phrasebook was published, with the following orthography:

А а	Б б	В в	Г г	Ғ ғ	Д д	Ј ј	Е е
Ё ё	Ж ж	Җ җ	З з	И и	Й й	К к	Қ қ
Л л	Љ љ	М м	Н н	Ҥ ҥ	Њ њ	О о	Ӧ ӧ
П п	Р р	С с	Т т	У у	Ӱ ӱ	Ф ф	Х х
Ц ц	Ч ч	Ҷ ҷ	Ш ш	Щ щ	Ъ ъ	Ы ы	Ь ь
Э э	Ю ю	Я я

== Sources ==
- (ru) Баскаков, Н.A., Диалект чернёвых татар (туба-кижи), Северные диалекты алтаиского (ойротского) языка, 2 volumes, Moscou, Nauka, 1965–1966.
