= Siberian Turkic languages =

Sub-branch of the Turkic language family

Siberian Turkic
- Northeastern Turkic
- Geographic distribution: Siberia
- Linguistic classification: Turkic: Common Turkic; Siberian Turkic
- Early form: Old Turkic
- Subdivisions: North; South

Language codes
- Glottolog: nort2688 (North) sout2693 (South) west2402 (West Yugur)
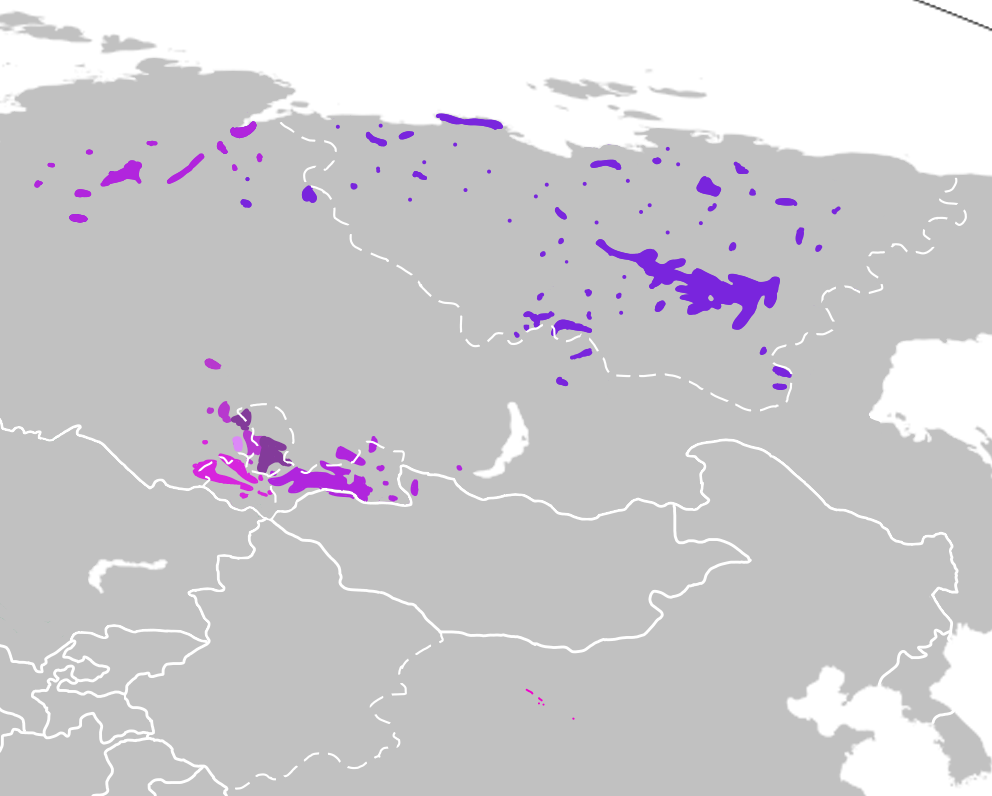
- Yakut Dolgan Khakas Chulym Shor Northern Altai Tuvan Tofa W. Yugur

The Siberian Turkic or Northeastern Common Turkic languages are a sub-branch of the Turkic language family. The following table is based upon the classification scheme presented by Lars Johanson (1998). All languages of the branch combined have approximately 670,000 native and second language speakers, with most widely spoken members being Yakut (c. 450,000 speakers), Tuvan (c. 130,000 speakers), Northern Altai (c. 57,000 speakers) and Khakas (c. 29,000 speakers). Despite their usual English name, two major Turkic languages spoken in Siberia, Siberian Tatar and Southern Altai, are not classified as Siberian Turkic, but are rather part of the Kipchak subgroup. Many of these languages have a Yeniseian substratum.

== Classification ==
Proto-Turkic	Common Turkic	Northeastern Common Turkic (Siberian)	North Siberian		Sakha (Yakut); Dolgan
Proto-Turkic	Common Turkic	Northeastern Common Turkic (Siberian)	South Siberian	Sayan Turkic	Tuvan; Tofa; † Soyot-Tsaatan; Tuha; Dukhan
Proto-Turkic	Common Turkic	Northeastern Common Turkic (Siberian)	South Siberian	Yenisei Turkic	Khakas; Northern Altai; Chelkan (Chalkan, Chalqandu); Kumandin; Tubalar; Shor (Saghay Qaca, Qizil); Western Yugur (Western Uyghur, Yellow Uyghur)
Proto-Turkic	Common Turkic	Northeastern Common Turkic (Siberian)	South Siberian	Chulym Turkic	Chulym († Lower and Middle)
Proto-Turkic	Common Turkic	Northeastern Common Turkic (Siberian)	South Siberian	Old Turkic	† Orkhon Turkic; † Old Uyghur

Alexander Vovin (2017) notes that Tofa and other Siberian Turkic languages, especially Sayan Turkic, have Yeniseian loanwords.
