= Sihirtia =

Mythical dwarf-like creatures

Sihirtia (Nenets: сихиртя) or Sirtia (Nenets: сиртя) were a mythical people who lived in the tundra before the arrival of the Nenets. The name is often encountered in the folklore of the Nenets.

According to legends, Sihirtia were of a very short stature, wearing beautiful clothes with metal pendants. Tall sandy hills served them as homes. They came out to the surface of the tundra at night or in the mist; they lived under the ground, where they traveled on dogs and pastured mammoths ("earth deer"). Sihirtia were skilled smiths and good warriors. Meeting a Sihirtia brought either misfortune or good luck. There were cases of marriage between Nenets and Sihirtia.

The folklore image of Sihirtia might have mythologically imprinted features of a real people (probably of Samoyedic or Paleo-Siberian origin) who lived in Europe and West Siberian tundra in antiquity. According to archeological data, the predecessors of the Nenets were not shepherds–reindeer herders, but engaged in fishing and hunting wild reindeer and sea mammals.

== See also ==
- Huldufólk, a similar concept in Icelandic folklore
- Pre-Finno-Ugric substrate

== Sources ==
- Уральская историческая энциклопедия. Изд. 2-е, перераб. и доп. / Гл. ред. В.В. Алексеев. Екатеринбург: Академкнига, 2000. 640 с.
