= Unified list of indigenous minority peoples of the North, Siberia, and the Far East of Russia =

Russian census classification

The Indigenous minority peoples of the North, Siberia, and the Far East of Russia (Note: Russian: коренные малочисленные народы Севера, Сибири и Дальнего Востока, romanized: korennyje maločislennyje narody Severa, Sibiri i Daljnego Vostoka) is a Russian census classification of local indigenous peoples, assigned to groups with fewer than 50,000 members, living in the Russian Far North, Siberia, or Russian Far East.

== Definition ==
Today, 40 indigenous peoples are officially recognised by Russia as indigenous small-numbered peoples and are listed in the Unified Register of the Indigenous Small-Numbered Peoples. (Note: Russian: Единый перечень коренных, малочисленных народов Российской Федерации, romanized: Jedinyj perečenj korennyh, maločislennyh narodov Rossijskoj Federaciji) This register includes 46 indigenous peoples. Six of these peoples do not live in either the Extreme North or territories equated to it, so that the total number of recognised indigenous peoples of the North is 40. The Komi-Izhemtsy or Izvatas, a subgroup of the Komi peoples, are seeking recognition from the Russian government as a distinct indigenous people of the North.

The Far North is the part of Russia which lies mainly beyond the Arctic Circle. However, this is the smaller part of the total territories inhabited by indigenous peoples. These territories extend southward as far as to Vladivostok. Approximately 261,763 people are altogether part of this classification.

== List of indigenous peoples of the North ==
The Unified Register lists the following peoples:

Name	Location	Population
Aleuts (алеуты)	Kamchatka Krai	482
Alyutors (алюторцы)	Kamchatka Krai	482
Chelkans (челканцы)	Altai Republic, Altai Krai	1,181
Chukchis (чукчи)	Chukotka Autonomous Okrug, Kamchatka Krai, Magadan Oblast, Sakha	16,000
Chulyms (чулымцы)	Krasnoyarsk Krai, Tomsk Oblast	382
Chuvans (чуванцы)	Chukotka Autonomous Okrug, Magadan Oblast	1,300
Dolgans (долганы)	Krasnoyarsk Krai, Sakha	7,885
Enets (энцы) (Yenets, Russian plural: Entsy, obsolete: Yenisei Samoyeds):	Krasnoyarsk Krai	227
Eskimo (Siberian Yupik) (эскимосы)	Chukotka Autonomous Okrug, Magadan Oblast	1,738
Evenks (эвенки):	Amur Oblast, Buryatian Republic, Irkutsk Oblast, Krasnoyarsk Krai, Khabarovsk Krai, Sakha, Zabaykalsky Krai	39,226
Evens (эвены)	Chukotka Autonomous Okrug, Kamchatka Krai, Khabarovsk Krai, Magadan Oblast, Sakha,	19,913
Itelmens (ительмены)	Kamchatka Krai, Magadan Oblast	3,193
Kamchadals (камчадалы, a general term for mixed population of Kamchatka Peninsula)	Kamchatka Krai, Magadan Oblast	1,927
Kereks (кереки)	Chukotka Autonomous Okrug	23
Kets (кеты)	Khanty-Mansi Autonomous Okrug-Yugra, Krasnoyarsk Krai, Tomsk Oblast, Yamal-Nenets Autonomous Okrug	1,088
Khanty (ханты) (old Russian term: Ostyaks)	Khanty-Mansi Autonomous Okrug-Yugra, Tyumen Oblast, Tomsk Oblast, Magadan Oblast, Yamal-Nenets Autonomous Okrug	31,467
Koryaks (коряки)	Chukotka Autonomous Okrug, Kamchatka Krai, Khabarovsk Krai, Krasnoyarsk Krai, Primorsky Krai, Sverdlovsk Oblast, Sakha	7,485
Kumandins (кумандинцы)	Altai Krai, Altai Republic, Kemerovo Oblast	2,892
Mansi (манси) (old Russian term: Voguls)	Khanty-Mansi Autonomous Okrug-Yugra, Sverdlovsk Oblast, Tyumen Oblast, Yamal-Nenets Autonomous Okrug	12,228
Nanai (нанайцы)	Jewish Autonomous Oblast, Kamchatka Krai, Khabarovsk Krai, Primorsky Krai, Sakhalin Oblast, Sakha	11,623
Naukan	Chukotka Autonomous Okrug	510
Negidals (негидальцы)	Khabarovsk Krai	481
Nenets (Russian plural: Nentsy, old Russian name: Samoyeds) (ненцы)	Arkhangelsk Oblast, Murmansk Oblast, Nenets Autonomous Okrug, Khanty-Mansi Autonomous Okrug-Yugra, Komi Republic, Krasnoyarsk Krai, Yamal-Nenets Autonomous Okrug,	49,646
Nganasans (Tavgi) (нганасаны)	Irkutsk Oblast, Krasnoyarsk Krai, Kurgan Oblast, Omsk Oblast, Primorsky Krai, Sakha, Sverdlovsk Oblast,	978
Nivkhs (нивхи)	Khabarovsk Krai, Sakhalin Oblast	4,652
Oroks (ороки)	Buryatia, Khabarovsk Krai, Primorsky Krai, Sakhalin Oblast	295
Orochs (орочи)	Khabarovsk Krai, Magadan Oblast, Sakhalin Oblast, Primorsky Krai	527
Sami (old Russian name: Lopar, i.e., Lapp) (саамы, саами)	Murmansk Oblast	1,530
Selkups (селькупы)	Krasnoyarsk Krai, Tomsk Oblast, Yamal-Nenets Autonomous Okrug	3,649
Shors (шорцы)	Altai Krai, Altai Republic, Kemerovo Oblask, Khakassia, Krasnoyarsk Krai	10,507
Soyots (сойоты)	Buryatia, Irkutsk Oblast	3,608
Taz (тазы)	Primorsky Krai	274
Telengits (теленгиты)	Altai Republic, Altai Krai	3,712
Teleuts (телеуты)	Altai Republic, Altai Krai, Kemerovo Oblast	2,643
Tofalars or Tofa (тофалары или тофы)	Buryatia, Irkutsk Oblast, Khakassia, Krasnoyarsk Krai, Sakha, Tomsk Oblast, Tuva Republic	719
Tubalars (тубалары)	Altai Republic, Altai Krai, Irkutsk Oblast	1,965
Tozhu (тувинцы-тоджинцы)	Tuva Republic	7,278
Udege (удэгейцы)	Khabarovsk Krai, Primorsky Krai	1,325
Ulchs (ульчи)	Jewish Autonomous Oblast, Kamchatka Krai, Khabarovsk Krai, Primorsky Krai	2,472
Veps (вепсы)	Republic of Karelia, Leningrad Oblast, Vologda Oblast	4,534
Votes (Водь)	Leningrad Oblast	99
Yukaghirs (юкагиры)	Chukotka, Magadan Oblast, Sakha	1,802

== See also ==
- Ainu in Russia
- Demographics of Siberia
- Indigenous peoples of Siberia
- List of minor Indigenous peoples of Russia
