= Shamanism in Siberia =

Indigenous religions in Siberia

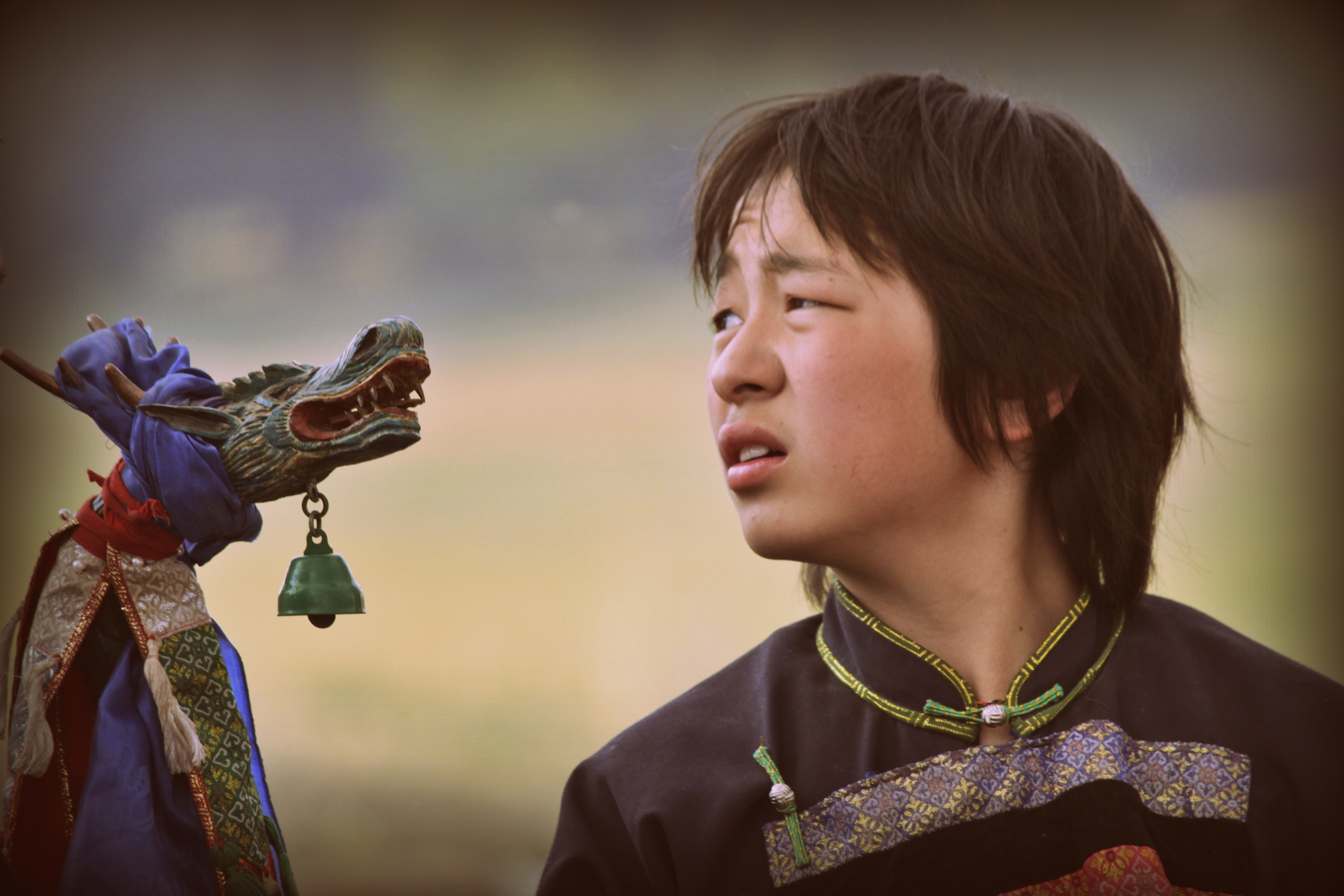
A Buryat boy in a shaman ritual

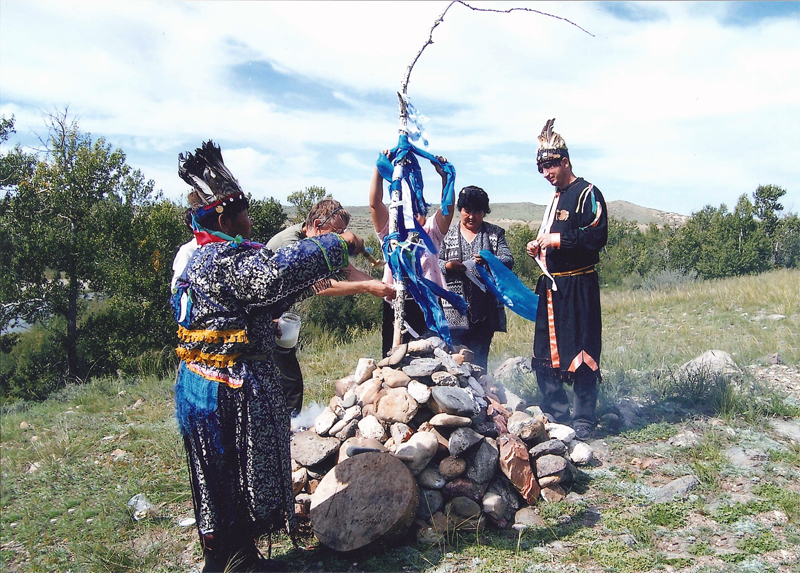
Tuvan shaman Tash-ool Buuevich Kunga consecrating an ovoo.

A large minority of people in North Asia, particularly in Siberia, follow the religio-cultural practices of shamanism. Some researchers regard Siberia as the heartland of shamanism.

The people of Siberia comprise a variety of ethnic groups, many of whom continue to observe shamanistic practices in modern times. Many classical ethnographers recorded the sources of the idea of "shamanism" among Siberian peoples.

== Terminology in Siberian languages ==
- 'shaman': saman (Nedigal, Nanay, Ulcha, Orok), sama (Manchu). The variant /šaman/ (i.e., pronounced "shaman") is Evenk (whence it was borrowed into Russian).
- 'shaman': alman, olman, wolmen (Yukagir)
- 'shaman': [qam] (Tatar, Shor, Oyrat), [xam] (Tuva, Tofalar)
- The Buryat word for shaman is бөө (böö) [bøː], from early Mongolian böge. Itself borrowed from Proto-Turkic *bögü ("sage, wizard")
- 'shaman': ńajt (Khanty, Mansi), from Proto-Uralic *nojta (cf. Sámi noaidi)
- 'shamaness': [iduɣan] (Mongol), [udaɣan] (Yakut), udagan (Buryat), udugan (Evenki, Lamut), odogan (Negidal). Related forms found in various Siberian languages include utagan, ubakan, utygan, utügun, iduan, or duana. All these are related to the Mongolian name of Etügen, the hearth goddess, and Etügen Eke 'Mother Earth'. Maria Czaplicka points out that Siberian languages use words for male shamans from diverse roots, but the words for female shaman are almost all from the same root. She connects this with the theory that women's practice of shamanism was established earlier than men's, that "shamans were originally female."

== Spirit-journey ==
Siberian shamans' spirit-journeys (reenacting their dreams wherein they had rescued the soul of the client) were conducted in, e.g., Oroch, Altai, and Nganasan healing séances.

== Songs, music ==
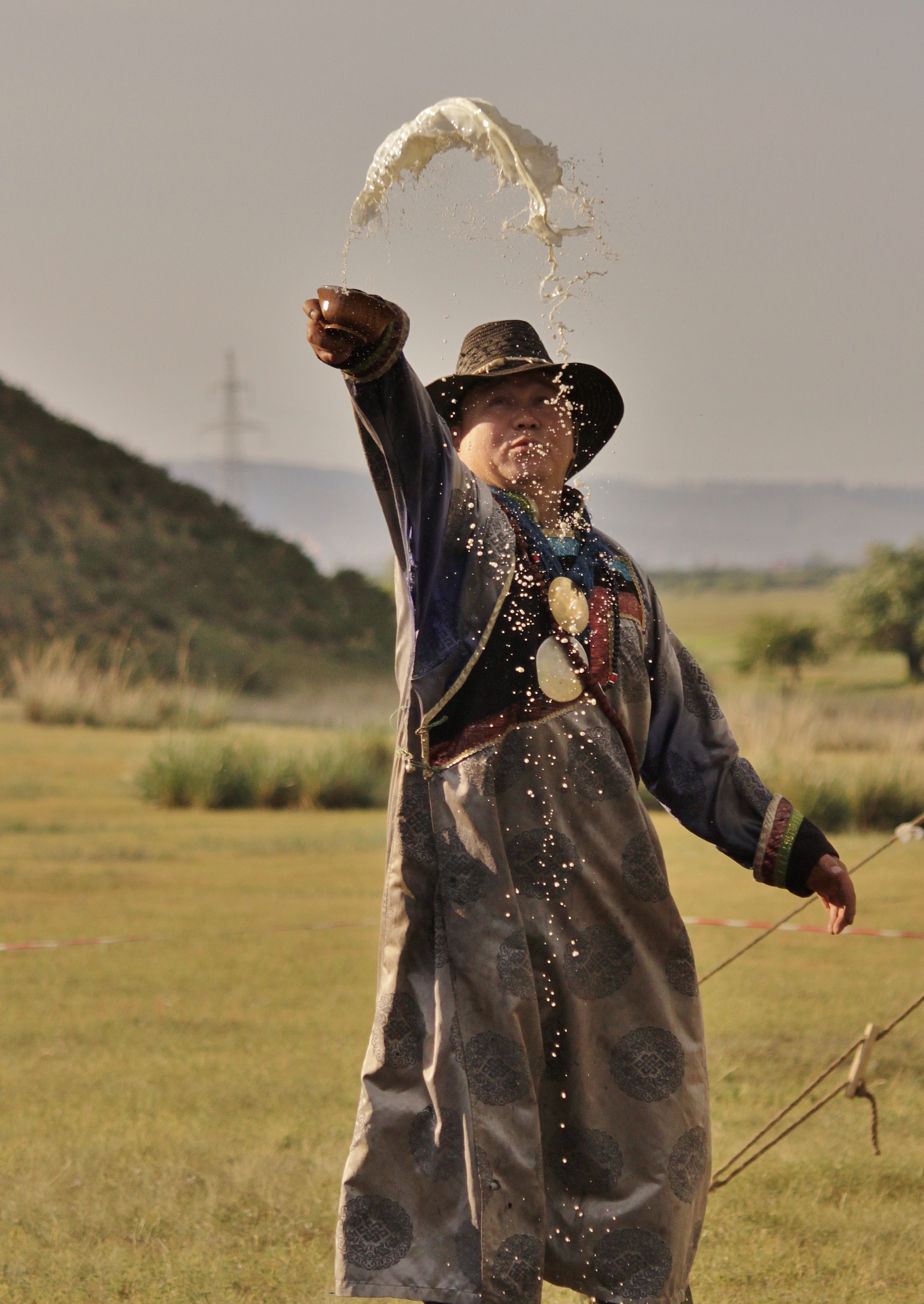
Buryat shaman performing a libation.

Shamanistic practice shows great diversity, even if restricted to Siberia. In some cultures, the music or song related to shamanistic practice may mimic natural sounds, sometimes with onomatopoeia.

This holds true for the practices of the noaidi among Sami groups. Although the Sami people live outside of Siberia, many of their shamanistic beliefs and practice shared important features with those of some Siberian cultures. The joiks of the Sami were sung on shamanistic rites. Recently, joiks are sung in two different styles: one of these is sung only by young people; the traditional one may be the other, the "mumbling" style, which resembles magic spells. Several surprising characteristics of joiks can be explained by comparing the music ideals, as observed in joiks and contrasted to music ideals of other cultures. Some joiks intend to mimic natural sounds. This can be contrasted to bel canto, which intends to exploit human speech organs on the highest level to achieve an almost "superhuman" sound.

The intention to mimic natural sounds is present in some Siberian cultures as well: overtone singing, and also shamanic songs of some cultures can be examples.

- In a Soyot shamanic song, sounds of bird and wolf are imitated to represent helping spirits of the shaman.
- The seances of Nganasan shamans were accompanied by women imitating the sounds of the reindeer calf, (thought to provide fertility for those women). In 1931, A. Popov observed the Nganasan shaman Dyukhade Kosterkin imitating the sound of polar bear: the shaman was believed to have transformed into a polar bear.

Sound mimesis is not restricted to Siberian cultures and is not necessarily linked to shamanistic beliefs or practices. See, for example, Inuit throat singing, a game played by women, an example of Inuit music that employs overtone singing, and, in some cases, the imitation of natural sounds (mostly those of animals, e.g. geese). The imitation of animal sounds can also serve such practical reasons as luring game in hunt.

== Grouped by linguistic relatedness ==
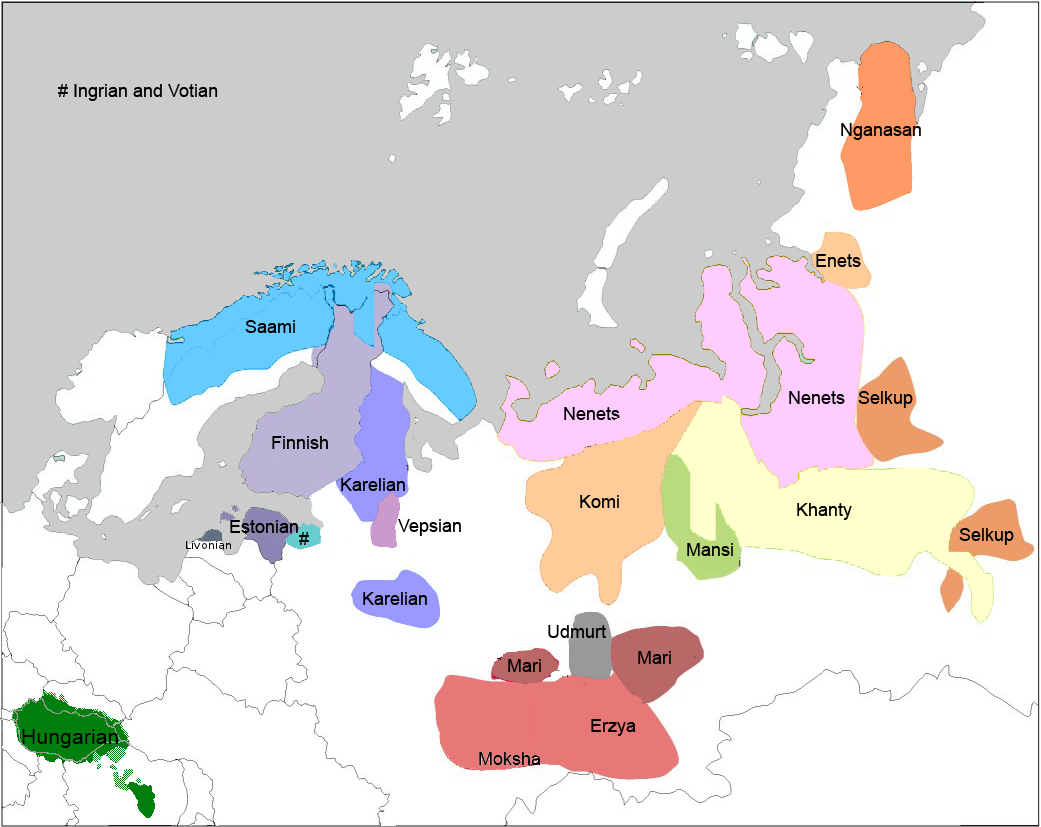
Uralic languages.

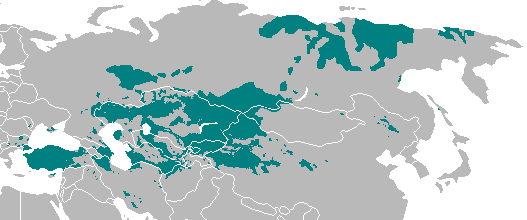
Turkic languages, including also North Siberian Yakuts (but Dolgans are omitted), South Siberian areas, and also Central Asia

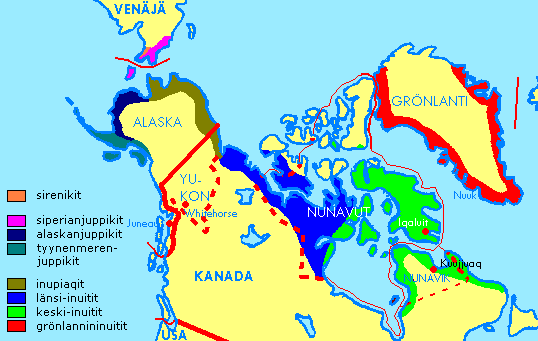
Eskimo language branch of the Eskimo–Aleut language family

=== Uralic ===
Uralic languages are proven to form a genealogical unit, a language family. Not all speakers of these languages live in Siberia or have shamanistic religions. The largest populations, the Hungarians and Finns, live outside Siberia and are mostly Christian. Sámi people had kept shamanic practices alive for a long time. They live in Europe, but practiced shamanism until the 18th century. Most others (e.g. Hungarian, Finnic, Mari) have only remnant elements of shamanism. The majority lives outside Siberia. Some of them used to live in Siberia, but have migrated to their present locations since then. The original location of the Proto-Uralic peoples (and its extent) is debated. Combined phytogeographical and linguistic considerations (distribution of various tree species and the presence of their names in various Uralic languages) suggest that this area was somewhere between the Kama and Vyatka rivers on the western side of the Ural Mountains.

==== Samoyedic ====
Among several Samoyedic peoples shamanism was a living tradition also in modern times, especially at groups living in isolation until recent times (Nganasans). There were distinguished several types of shamans among the Nenets, Enets, and Selkup people. (The Nganasan shaman used three different crowns, according to the situation: one for upper world, one for underneath word, one for occasion of childbirth.)

Nenets, Enets, and Nganasans speak Northern Samoyedic languages. They live in North Siberia (Nenets live also in European parts), they provide classical examples. Selkups are the only ones who speak Southern Samoyedic languages nowadays. They live more to the south, shamanism was in decline also at the beginning of the 20th century, although folklore memories could be recorded even in the 1960s. Other Southern Samoyedic languages were spoken by some peoples living in the Sayan Mountains, but language shift has taken place, making all these languages extinct.

==== Nenets ====
There were several types of shamans distinguishing ones contacting upper world, ones contacting underneath world, ones contacting the dead.

==== Nganasan ====
The isolated location of the Nganasan people ensured that shamanism was a living phenomenon among them even in the beginning of the 20th century, the last notable Nganasan shaman's seances could be recorded on film in the 1970s.

One of the occasions in which the shaman partook was the clean tent rite, held after the polar night, which included sacrifices.

==== Sayan Samoyedic ====
Some peoples of the Sayan Mountains spoke once Southern Samoyedic languages. Most of them underwent a language shift in the beginning and middle of the 19th century, borrowing the language of neighboring Turkic peoples. The Kamassian language survived longer: 14 old people spoke it yet in 1914. In the late 20th century, some old people had passive or uncertain knowledge of the language, but collecting reliable scientific data was no longer possible. Today Kamassian is regarded as extinct.

The shamanism of Samoyedic peoples in the Sayan Mountains survived longer (if we regard Karagas as a Samoyedic people, although such approaches have been refined: the problem of their origin may be more complex). Diószegi Vilmos could record not only folklore memories in the late 1950s, but he managed also to talk personally to (no longer practicing) shamans, record their personal memories, songs, some of their paraphernalia.

Whether this shamanism is borrowed entirely from neighboring Turkic peoples, or whether it has some ethnic features, maybe remnants of Samoyedic origin, is unresolved. Comparative considerations suggest, that

- Karagas shamanism is affected by Abakan-Turkic and Buryat influence. Among the various Soyot cultures, the central Soyot groups, keeping cattle and horses, show Khalkha Mongol phenomena in their shamanism, the shamanism of Western Soyots, living on the steppe, is similar to that of Altai Turkic peoples. A shaman story narrates contacts between Soyots and Abakan Turkic peoples in a mythical form.
- Karagas and Eastern (reindeer-breeding, mountain-inhabiting) Soyots. have many similarities in their culture and shamanism. It was these two cultures who presented some ethnic features, phenomena lacking among neighboring Turkic peoples. E.g., the structure of their shamanic drum showed such peculiarity: it had two transoms. It was also these two cultures who showed some features, which could be possibly of Samoyedic origin: the shaman's headdress, dress and boots has the effigies symbolizing human organs, mostly bones; in the case of headdress, representation of human face. Also the dress-initiating song of the Karagas shaman Kokuyev contained the expression "my shamanic dress with seven vertebrae". Hoppál interprets the skeleton-like overlay of the Karagas shaman-dress as symbol of shamanic rebirth, similar remark applies for the skeleton-like iron ornamentation of the (not Samoyedic, but genealogically unclassified, Paleosiberian) Ket shamanic dress, although it may symbolize also the bones of the loon (the helper animal of the shaman). (The theory of Ket origin of the Karagas has already been mentioned above.) The skeleton-like overlay symbolized shamanic rebirth also among some other Siberian cultures.

==== Hungarian ====
Starting from the late 9th century onwards, the ancestors of the Hungarian people migrated from their Proto-Uralic homeland in Siberia to the Pannonian Basin, an area that includes present-day Hungary. Today, shamanism is no longer widely practiced by Hungarians, but elements of shamanism have been preserved in their folklore. Comparative methods reveal that some motifs used in folktales, fragments of songs and folk rhymes retain aspects of the ancient belief system. In an effort to prove that shamanistic remnants existed within Hungarian folklore ethnographer, Diószegi Vilmos, compared ethnographic records of Hungarian and neighboring peoples, and works about various shamanic traditions of some Siberian peoples. Mihály Hoppál continued Diószegi Vilmos's work comparing shamanic beliefs of speakers of Uralic languages with those of several non-Uralic Siberian peoples.

Although Ugrian folklore preserves many traces of shamanism, shamanism itself was a dying practice among the Khanty and Mansi people by the 1930s. Shamanism is still practiced by many indigenous peoples, but, among the modern Ugrians, shamanism is largely practiced by the Khanty.

=== Ket ===
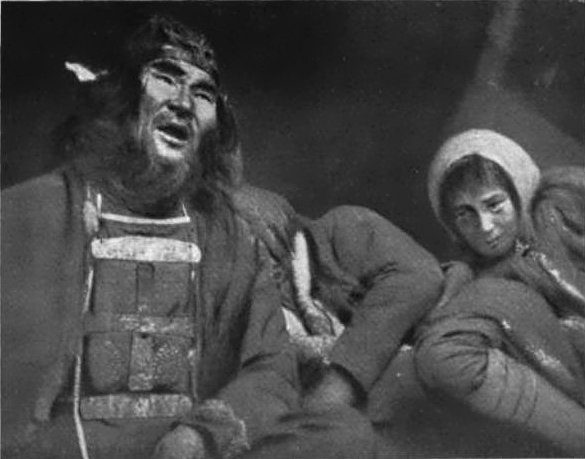
Ket shaman, 1914.

Traditional culture of Ket people was researched by Matthias Castrén, Vasiliy Ivanovich Anuchin, Kai Donner, Hans Findeisen, Yevgeniya Alekseyevna Alekseyenko. Shamanism was a living practice in the 1930s yet, but by the 1960s almost no authentic shaman could be found. Ket shamanism shared features with those of Turkic and Mongolic peoples. Besides that, there were several types of shamans, differing in function (sacral rites, curing), power and associated animal (deer, bear). Also among Kets (like at several other Siberian peoples, e.g. Karagas), there are examples of using skeleton symbolics, Hoppál interprets it as a symbol of shamanic rebirth, although it may symbolize also the bones of the loon (the helper animal of the shaman, joining air and underwater world, just like the shaman who travelled both to the sky and the underworld as well). The skeleton-like overlay represented shamanic rebirth also among some other Siberian cultures.

=== Turkic ===
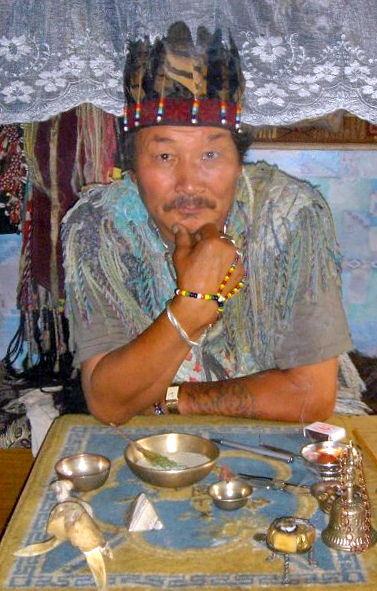
A shaman doctor of Kyzyl, Tuva.

Turkic peoples spread over large territories, and are far from alike. In some cases, shamanism has been widely amalgamated with Islam, in others with Buddhism, but there are surviving traditions among the Siberian Tatars, Tuvans, and Tofalar.

The Altai Turks may be related to neighboring Ugrian, Samoyed, Ket, or Mongols. There may be also ethnographic traces of such past of these nowadays Turkic-speaking peoples of the Altai. For example, some of them have phallic-erotic fertility rites, and that can be compared to similar rites of Ugrians.

=== Tungusic ===
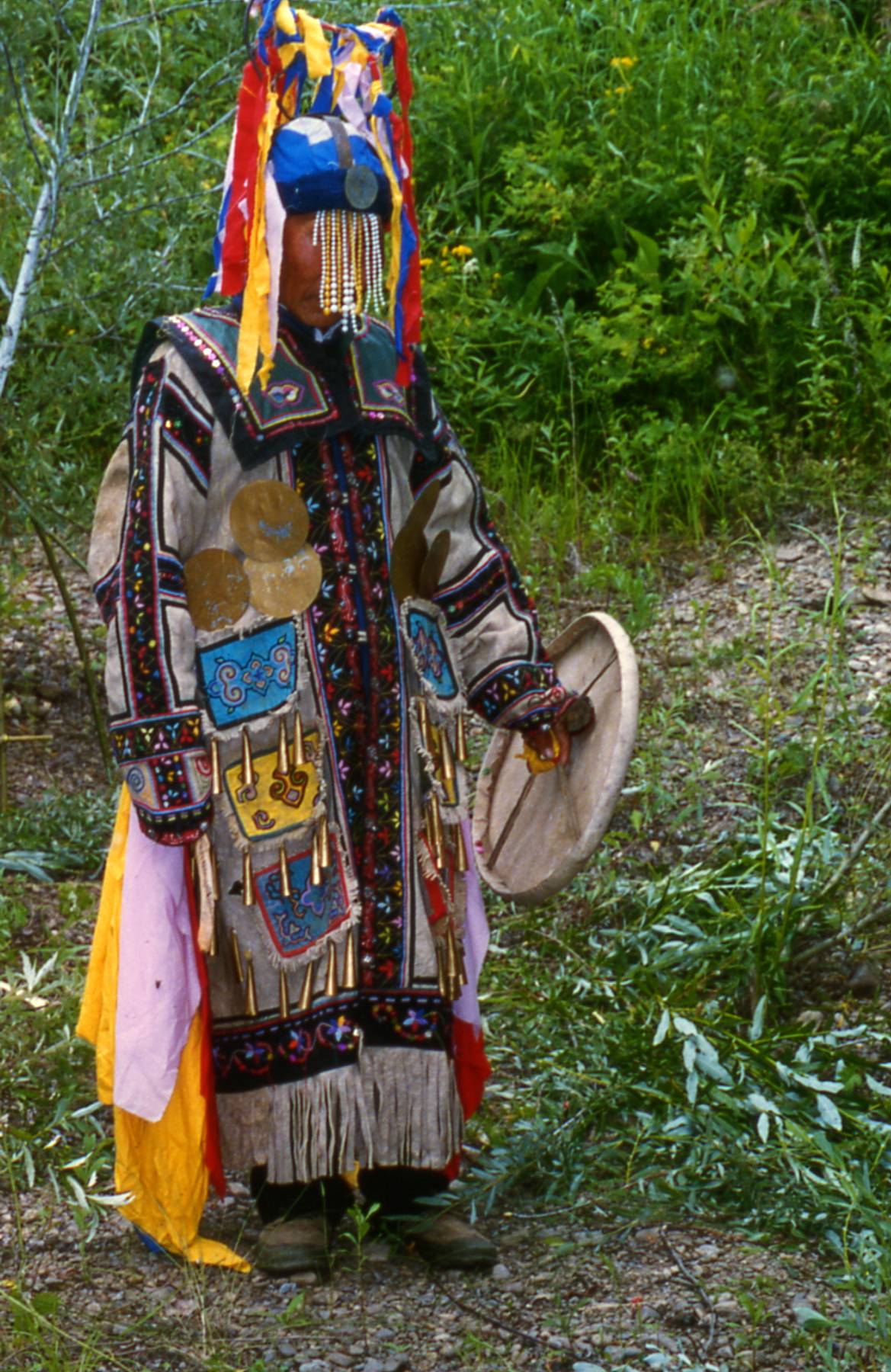
Chuonnasuan (1927–2000), the last shaman of the Oroqen people, picture taken by Richard Noll in July 1994 in Manchuria near the border between China and Russia. Oroqen shamanism is now extinct.

Among the Tungusic peoples of Siberia, shamanism is also widespread.

The Tale of the Nisan Shaman, a famous piece of folklore which describes the resurrection of a rich landowner's son by a female shaman, is known among various Tungusic peoples including the Manchus, Evenks, and Nanai people.

=== Koryak and Chukchi ===
Linguistically, Koryak and Chukchi are close congeners of Yup'il. Koryak shamanism is known.

=== Yupik ===
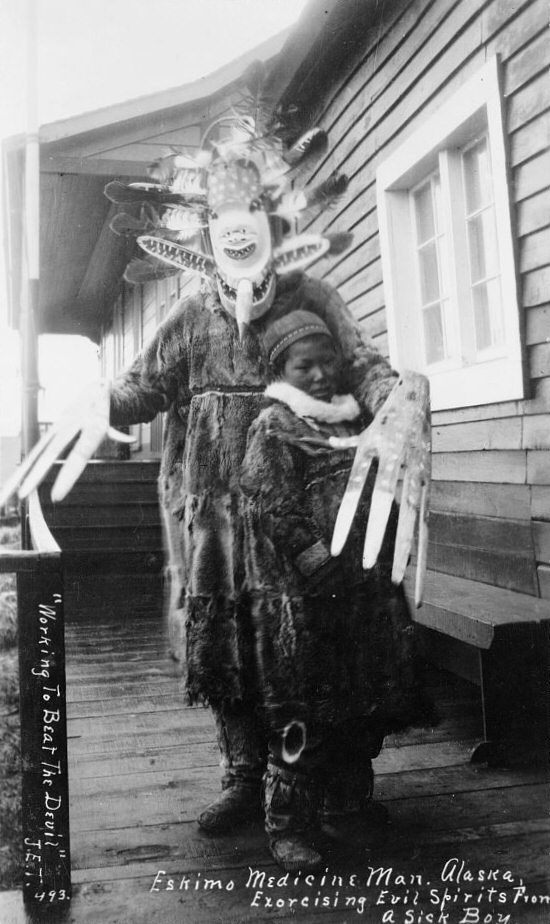
Yup'ik shaman exorcising evil spirits from a sick boy, Nushagak, Alaska, 1890s

Yup'ik groups comprise a huge area stretching from Eastern Siberia through Alaska and Northern Canada (including Labrador Peninsula) to Greenland. Shamanistic practice and beliefs have been recorded at several parts of this vast area crosscutting continental borders.

Like Yup'ik cultures themselves, shamanistic practices reveal diversity. Some mosaic-like examples from various cultures: the soul concepts of the various cultures were diverse as well, some groups believed that the young child had to be taken for by guardian names inherited from a recently deceased relative. Among some groups, this belief amounted to a kind of reincarnation. Also shamanism might include beliefs in soul dualism, where the free-soul of the shaman could fly to celestial or underneath realms, contacting mythological beings, negotiating with them in order to cease calamities or achieve success in hunt. If their wrath was believed to be caused by taboo breaches, the shaman asked for confessions by members of the community.

In most cultures, shamanism could be refused by the candidate: calling could be felt by visions, but generally, becoming a shaman followed conscious considerations.

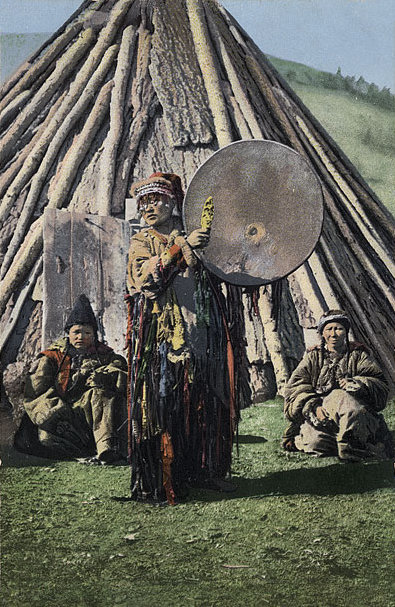
An Altai Kizhi or Khakas shaman woman – her exact origin cannot be ascertained from the image alone. Early 20th century.

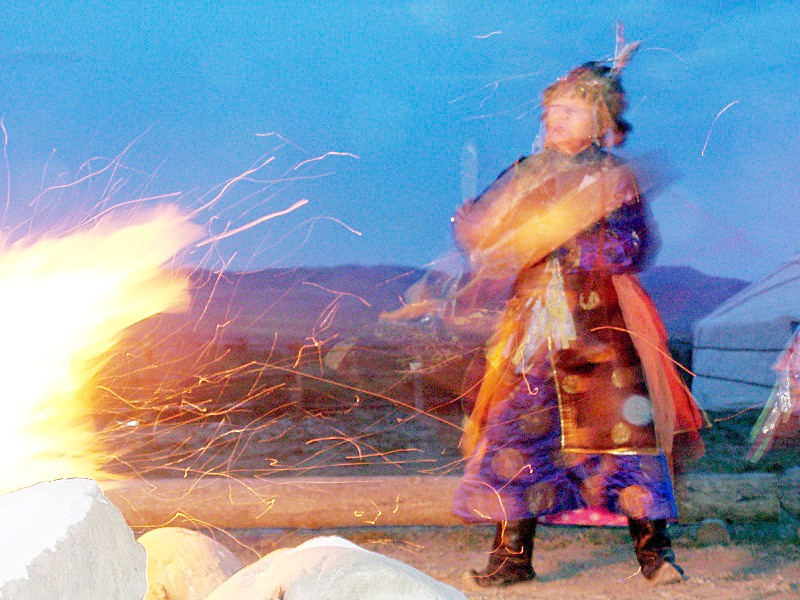
Shaman holding a séance by fire. Settlement Kyzyl, region Tuva, Russia

=== Nivkh ===
Shamanism was a central part of religious and spiritual traditions of the Nivkhs, who are indigenous to the Amur river basin and adjacent Sakhalin island. Shamans (ch'am) traditionally diagnosed and cured disease. The rare shamans typically wore an elaborate coats with belts often made of metal. Remedies composed of plant and sometimes animal matter were employed to cure sickness. Talismans were used or offered to patients to prevent sickness. Shamans additionally functioned as a conduit to combat and ward off evil spirits that cause death. A shaman's services usually were compensated with goods, quarters and food. Chiyo Nakamura, a Sakhalin Nivkh shaman, was responsible for recording, preserving, and donating artifacts related to Nivkh shamanism as it declined.

== Demographics ==
The 2002 census of the Russian Federation reports 123,423 (0.23% of the population) people of ethnic groups which dominantly adhere to "traditional beliefs"

Traditional beliefs in Russia, based on 2002 Russian Census and Ethnic Group predominant religion
Ethnic Group	Population (2002)
Evenks	35,527
Nanais	12,160
Evens	19,071
Chukchi	15,767
Mansi	11,432
Koryaks	8,743
Nivkhs	5,162
Itelmeni	3,180
Ulchs	2,913
Yup'ik	1,750
Udege	1,657
Ket	1,494
Chuvans	1,087
Tofalar	837
Nganasans	834
Orochs	686
Aleut	540
Oroks	346
Enets	237
Total	123,423

== See also ==
- Indigenous peoples of the Russian North
- Shamanism in the Qing dynasty
- Shamanism in Russia
- Ainu religion
- Chinese shamanism
- Hungarian Native Faith
- Korean shamanism
- Manchu shamanism
- Mongolian shamanism
- Uralic neopaganism
- Yakut shamanism
- Reindeer in Siberian Shamanism
