= Natural sounds =

Sounds from non-human sources

Audio clip of the natural sounds of rainfall and birdsong

Natural sounds are any sounds produced by non-human organisms as well as those generated by natural, non-biological sources within their normal soundscapes. It is a category whose definition is open for discussion. Natural sounds create an acoustic space.

The definition of the soundscape can be broken down into three components: the geophony, non-biological natural sounds that include the effects of water by a stream or waves at the ocean, the effects of wind in the trees or grasses, and sound generated by the earth, itself, for example, glaciers, avalanches and earthquakes; the biophony, all the non-human, non-domestic sounds that emanate from a relatively undisturbed habitat; and anthrophony, all sound generated by human endeavor, whether music, theatre, or electromechanical.

== Definition ==
Humans are a product of nature this could be considered part of nature. However, humans have long-considered themselves to be separate and in conflict. For that reason, a special category of the soundscape has been set aside for humans alone. Called anthrophony, it includes all of the sound that humans produce, whether structured (i. e. music, theatre, film, etc.), or entropic, as in the electromechanical chaotic and uncontrolled signals we generate by whatever means. Anthrophony has a profound effect on the natural soundscape and the featured organisms who play seminal roles in those habitats, but the nature of that effect varies with the types and families of sound and their relative intensity.

Natural sounds are restricted to natural sources in their normal soundscape because clips of isolated natural sources are like sound bites: without context the sounds are prone to be misinterpreted.

== History ==
The historical background of natural sounds as they have come to be defined, begins with the recording of a single bird, by Ludwig Koch, as early as 1889. Koch's efforts in the late 19th and early 20th centuries set the stage for the universal audio capture model of single-species—primarily birds at the outset—that subsumed all others during the first half of the 20th century and well into the latter half and into the early 21st, as well.

In late 1968, influenced by acoustic efforts in the fields of music and film, this model began to evolve into a much more holistic effort with attention paid to the acoustic experience of entire habitats, inclusive of all the wild animal voices. Expressed as wild soundscapes, these phenomena included sounds primarily from two main sources, non-human and non-domestic wild ones, and non-biological sources in relatively undisturbed habitats.

== Humans ==
Humans can benefit from natural environments to restore from stress and directed attention fatigue. A human can endure high levels of stress for short time periods as long as these periods are interrupted by restoration moments.

While a natural environment provides more sensory input than the soundscape there are indications that the soundscape alone also affords restoration. A majority of humans indicate that they find natural sounds pleasurable.

== Animals ==
=== Territory sounds ===
These are sounds, calls, or audible signals made by any one species to its own or any other species, establishing boundaries so like or unlike species will not transgress those boundaries.

Male baboons make sounds heard for miles by other baboons, communicating to those other male baboons, the territory of that male baboon. The strength, volume, and timbre, inherent in that "call", determine whether or not rival males attempt to invade that male baboon's territory.

They do this to make them sound impressive and then to attract the female to them.

=== Courtship and/or mate attracting sounds ===
These are sounds made by the male baboon to attract females to his territory for courtship and mating. Again, the strength, quality, and timbre of those sounds, often determine the ability of that species to attract females for reproduction. These mating calls, often low and guttural, are the main criteria, used by the female baboon to determine which male she mates with.

== Cultural references ==
The imitation of natural sounds in various cultures is a diverse phenomenon. and can fill in various functions. In several instances, it is related to the belief system, for example, imitation of natural sounds can be linked to various shamanistic beliefs or practice (e.g. yoiks of the Sami, some other shamanic songs and rituals, overtone singing of some cultures). It may serve also such practical goals as luring game in the hunt; or entertainment (such as the katajjaq of the Inuit).

== See also ==
- Animal communication
- Animal language
- Bioacoustics
- Bird vocalization
- Soundscape
- Soundscape ecology
- Bernie Krause
- Whale sound
- Biophony
- Geophony
- Anthrophony
