= Imitation of sounds in shamanism =

Sound mimesis in shamanic practices

Shamanism in various cultures shows great diversity. In some cultures, shamanic music may intentionally mimic natural sounds, sometimes with onomatopoeia. Imitation of natural sounds may also serve other functions not necessarily related to shamanism, such as luring in the hunt; and entertainment (katajjaqs of the Inuit).

== Localities ==
=== Sami ===
This holds e. g. for shamanism among Sami groups. Some of their shamanistic beliefs and practice shared important features with those of some Siberian cultures. Some of the Sami yoiks were sung during shamanistic rites, this memory is conserved also in folklore tales of shamans. In the modern day, yoiks are sung in two different styles, one only used by young people. The more common style of singing, the "mumbling" style, resembles magic spell-chanting.

Several characteristics of yoiks can be explained through comparing the concepts of musical ideals as observed in yoiks with the ideals of other cultures. Some yoiks intend to mimic natural sounds. This can be contrasted with bel canto, which intends to exploit the human speech organs on the highest level to achieve a nearly "superhuman" sound.

=== Siberia ===
Shamanism in Siberia is far from being homogeneous. In some of the various cultures there, mimicking natural sounds can be present: some instances of overtone singing, and also certain shamanic songs of some cultures can be examples.

==== Samoyedic ====
The seances of Nganasan shamans were accompanied by women imitating the sounds of a reindeer calf, (thought to provide fertility for women). In 1931, A. Popov observed the Nganasan shaman Dyukhade Kosterkin imitating the sound of a polar bear in order to spiritually transform into one.

==== Obi-Ugric ====
A Russian traveler described a Khanty shamanic séance: it took place in a birch bark tent in full darkness. Only the song and the dombra music of the shaman could be heard: he invoked his spirits. It was performed in a way to suggest the direction of the sound was moving: implying that the shaman had flown around inside the tent before leaving it. Later, the voices of various animals (cuckoo, owl, hoopoe, duck, squirrel) could be heard. Later, the shaman performed a "flight" back into the tent via the song.

==== Altai ====
Among several peoples near the Altai Mountains, the new drum of a shaman must go through a special ritual. This is regarded as "giving the drum life": the tree and the deer who gave their wood and skin for the new drum narrate their whole lives and promise to the shaman that they will serve him. The ritual itself involves a libation: beer is poured onto the skin and wood of the drum, and these materials "come to life" and speak with the voice of the shaman in the name of the tree and the deer. Among the Tubalar, this means the imitation of the behavior and the voice of the animal by the shaman.

In a Soyot shamanic song, the sounds of birds and wolves are imitated to represent the spirits helping the shaman.
