= Sound mimesis in various cultures =

Cultural role of sound memesis

The imitation of natural sounds in various cultures is a diverse phenomenon and can fill in various functions. In several instances, it is related to the belief system (yoiks of the Sami, some other shamanic songs and rituals, overtone singing of some cultures). It may serve also such practical goals as luring in the hunt; or entertainment (katajjaqs of Inuit).

Among some peoples of the Altai-Sayan region, including Tofa, the ability to mimic sounds of the environment includes hunting calls, and is present also in a traditional singing tradition preserved only by some old people.

== Fields ==
=== Shamanism ===
Shamanism in various cultures shows great diversity. In some cultures, the music or songs related to shamanistic practice may mimic natural sounds, sometimes with onomatopoeia.

=== Entertainment ===
The intention to mimic natural sounds is not necessarily linked to shamanistic beliefs or practice alone. Katajjaq (a "genre" of music of some Inuit groups) is a game played by women, for entertainment. In some instances, natural sounds (mostly those of animals, e.g. geese) are imitated.

=== Luring animals ===
The kind of katajjaq mentioned above, which mimics the cry of geese, shows some similarities with the practice of hunters to lure game.

Some Inuit used a tool (shaped like a claw) to scratch the ice of the frozen sea in order to attract seals.

== See also ==
- Onomatopoeia
- Prehistoric music
- Vocal learning
- Pishing - imitation of bird sounds by birdwatchers
