= Soyot =

Turkic ethnic group in Buryatia

Soyot сойоты
- Distribution of Soyots in Okinsky District of Buryatia

Total population
- 4,368 (2021)

Regions with significant populations
- Russia: Buryatia: 4,368

Languages
- Buryat, Soyot (partly revitalized)

Religion
- Tibetan Buddhism, Tengrism (shamanism)

Related ethnic groups
- Buryats, Dukhans, Tofalar, Tozhu Tuvans, Koibals

The Soyot are an ethnic group who mainly live in the Oka region in the Okinsky District in Buryatia, Russia. They share much of their history with the Tofalar, Tozhu Tuvans, Dukha, and Buryat; the Soyot have taken on a great deal of Buryat cultural influence and were grouped together with them under Soviet policy. Due to intermarriage between Soyots and Buryats, the Soyot population is heavily mixed with the Buryat. In 2000, they were reinstated as a distinct ethnic group.

Like other taiga peoples, the Soyot traditionally practiced reindeer breeding and hunting and lived nomadically, but today most Soyot live in villages. According to the 2021 census, there were 4,368 Soyots in Russia.

The Soyot language is Turkic, and closely corresponds with the Tofalar language; most Soyot spoke Buryat during Russian rule, but following the collapse of the Soviet Union, there has been an active effort to revitalize the formerly extinct Soyot language.

== Etymology ==
The name Soyot is from the endonym 'soyyt.' The Buryat call them 'hoyod' and the Tofalar call them 'hazut' which is derived from the name of the largest Soyot clan, the Khaazuut.

== History ==
=== Origin ===
According to Larisa R. Pavlinskaya, a Russian ethnographer based in St. Petersburg, Russia, the ancestor of the Soyots (and the closely related Tofalars, Tozhu Tuvans, and Dukha) were proto-Samoyedic hunter-gatherers who arrived in the Eastern Sayan region from Western Siberia at the end of the third millennium BC and the beginning of the second millennium BC. At the beginning the first millennium AD, Turkic speaking cattle and horse breeders migrated from the Inner Asian steppes and would go on to significantly influence the Samoyedic, Ket, and Tungus populations of the Eastern Sayan Mountains. Despite adopting their language, these groups resisted full Turkification by retreating into the inaccessible mountains and traded with the new steppe peoples by providing them with furs throughout the Middle Ages.

Around 350–400 years ago, the Soyots moved from the Lake Khövsgöl area to modern day Buryatia, where the Dukha and Uyghur-Uryankhay (Tuha) people were still living. Many reindeer herding Soyots moved to the mountain range dividing the Oka River and Irkut River.

=== Russian imperial expansion ===
In the mid 1600s, the Russian Empire first reached the Eastern Sayans and had asserted full control of the area by the beginning of the 1700s; following the Treaty of Kiakhta in 1727, the Russian government then resettled 100 Buryat families from the regions of Pribaikalia and Transbaikilia to the Okinsky area to guard the Chinese border. The newly arrived Buryats adopted some Soyot customs, such as taking up yak breeding and seasonal migration. They also adopted the practice of using reindeer as mounts to hunt but never took up reindeer-herding, preferring to instead borrow reindeer during the hunting season or keeping their reindeer among Soyot herds.

The Buryats greatly influenced the Soyots. By the end of the 1800s, the Buryats dominated administration and their language displaced the Soyot language, and even their cattle-breeding culture came to predominate the Soyots' traditional reindeer-herding.

A Norwegian scientific expedition in the early 1910s collected information on the customs of the Soyot, eventually publishing the book Et primitivt folk de mongolske rennomader in 1915; it had several dozen photographs, recorded a short list of Soyot words and a retelling of a Soyot shamanistic tale of divination, along with accounts of both shamanistic and Buddhist rituals practiced by the Soyot.

=== Russian civil war ===
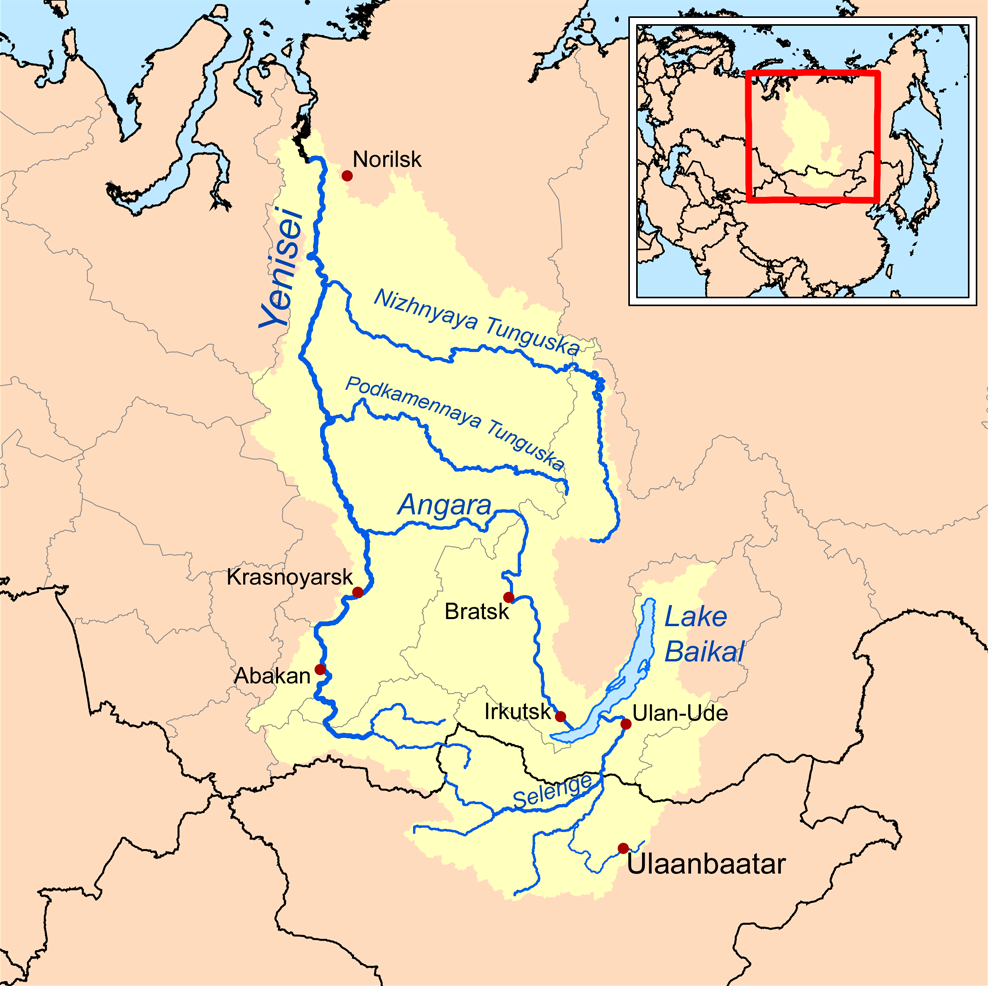
In 1920 Dr. Ossendowski traveled from Krasnoyarsk, on the Yenisei River through the land of the Soyot

In 1920, the Polish scientist and writer Dr. Ferdinand Ossendowski, narrowly escaped being arrested by the Red Army and fled into the Siberia with his companions where he traveled through the traditional lands of the Soyot. He first spent some time living in the taiga along the shores of the Yenisei River, where he and his companions followed the Tuba and Anyl Rivers to the Sayan Mountains. He later wrote and published a book entitled Beasts, Men and Gods recounting his experiences.

After three days we crossed the northern ridge of the Sayan chain, passed the border river Algiak and, after this day, were abroad in the territory of Urianhai. This wonderful land, rich in most diverse forms of natural wealth, is inhabited by a branch of the Mongols, which is now only sixty thousand and which is gradually dying off, speaking a language quite different from any of the other dialects of this folk and holding as their life ideal the tenet of "Eternal Peace." Urianhai long ago became the scene of administrative attempts by Russians, Mongols and Chinese, all of whom claimed sovereignty over the region whose unfortunate inhabitants, the Soyots, had to pay tribute to all three of these overlords.

— Ferdinand Ossendowski, Beasts, Men and Gods

While in Urianhai, Ossendowski met Ta Lama, Prince of Soldjak and High Priest of the Buddhist Temple; after healing the prince's wife's eyes, the prince ordered one of the Soyots to guide the party to Lake Khövsgöl. Their Soyot guide took them through the Ulaan Taiga and the Darkhad Valley where they encountered Soyot herdmen rapidly driving their cattle over the Darkhat plain and towards the Orgarkha Ola. They told Ossendowski's party that they were fleeing Bolsheviks from the Irkutsk district who had crossed the Mongolian border and captured the Russian colony at Khathyl and were continuing to advance.

The inhabitants of Urianhai, the Soyots, are proud of being the genuine Buddhists and of retaining the pure doctrine of holy Rama and the deep wisdom of Sakkia-Mouni. They are the eternal enemies of war and of the shedding of blood. Away back in the thirteenth century they preferred to move out from their native land and take refuge in the north rather than fight or become a part of the empire of the bloody conqueror Jenghiz Khan, who wanted to add to his forces these wonderful horsemen and skilled archers. Three times in their history they have thus trekked northward to avoid struggle and now no one can say that on the hands of the Soyots there has ever been seen human blood. With their love of peace they struggled against the evils of war. Even the severe Chinese administrators could not apply here in this country of peace the full measure of their implacable laws. In the same manner the Soyots conducted themselves when the Russian people, mad with blood and crime, brought this infection into their land. They avoided persistently meetings and encounters with the Red troops and Partisans, trekking off with their families and cattle southward into the distant principalities of Kemchik and Soldjak. The eastern branch of this stream of emigration passed through the valley of the Buret Hei, where we constantly outstrode groups of them with their cattle and herds.

— Ferdinand Ossendowski, Beasts, Men and Gods

In 1926, Bernhard Eduardovich Petri, a professor of ethnology at the Irkutsk University, led the first anthropological expedition into the Soyot reindeer-herding region where he claimed that the Soyot reindeer-herding was a "dying branch of the economy." After the civil war, Petri was involved in planning changes in the economic lives of the minorities of the greater Altai-Sayan and Buryatia regions, including the Evenk, Soyot, and Tofalar. He was later accused of spying for British and German intelligence and establishing contacts with Buryat nationalists, leading to his execution in 1937. Despite these difficulties, later research and data collected from Soyot elders showed that the practice of reindeer-herding survived until the mid 20th century.

=== Soviet collectivization ===
In the early 1930s, the Soviet state merged all individually owned herds into one collective herd owned by the state and forced the Soyot and other Siberian peoples into sedentarism. Between 1928 and 1940, many Soyots were moved to Sorok, Khurga, Bokson, and Orlik, the administrative center of Okinsky District; Soyots were also moved to cattle-breeding farms where they switched to Buryat-style husbandry. In 1963, the Soviet government labeled traditional nomadic reindeer-herding unprofitable and disbanded the herd.

In 1940, the Okinsky Region was designated as an aimag and recognized its entire population as Buryat, causing the Soyot to lose their official identity as a Russian ethnic group. There was widespread disapproval of the decision, but few were willing to protest against the decision. This policy caused Soyot national identity to erode, and Soyots were heavily assimilated into the Buryat population. By the late 1980s, only 30 people still identified as Soyots.

=== After Soviet collapse ===
Following the collapse of the Soviet Union in 1991, there was a dramatic revival of Soyot culture. In 1993, the Association of the Soyot Nation was founded. In 2000, the People's Khural of the Republic of Buryatia changed the name of the Okinsky Region of the Soyot National Aimag at the request of the Okinsky Region's government. In the same year, the Soyot succeeded in restoring their name and identity as one of the officially recognized Indigenous small-numbered peoples of the North, Siberia and the Far East.

== Language ==
The Soyot language is a member of the Turkic family, and is closely related to the Tofa language; the Soyot language has many Buryat and medieval and contemporary Mongol loanwords. However, the Soyot language lost ground to the Buryat language due to Buryat influence and intermarriage between the two groups beginning in the 1800s; by 1996, the language was almost lost entirely.

After many years of research, the Russian linguist Valentin I. Rassadin developed an alphabet for the Soyot language in the early 2000s, before going onto develop the first Soyot dictionary and primer. The Sorok secondary school, a state boarding for Soyot children, then began to teach the Soyot language to its students.

== Reindeer herding ==
Reindeer herding was a large facet of Soyot life. It enabled them to travel through vast territories of mountainous taiga and were indispensable for hunting; it also provided them with clothing, shelter, milk, meat, and various other household items. However, the Soyot tradition of herding reindeer was ended in 1963 when the Soviet government disbanded the collective Soyot reindeer herd.

Sevyan Vainshtein, a Russian ethnographer and professor at the Institute of Ethnology and Anthropology of the Russian Academy of Sciences in Moscow, undertook several expeditions to study reindeer herders, including the Soyot, and published a number of works on the subject. He argued that Sayan reindeer-herding was "the oldest form of reindeer-herding" and associated with the earlier domestication of the reindeer of the Samoyedic taiga population. He went so far to propose the Sayan region as the origin of the economic and cultural complex of reindeer hunters-herdsmen seen among the Evenki groups and peoples of the Sayan area.

Daniel Plumely suggested that the Soyot, Tofalar, Tozhu Tuvans, and Dukha, may have all "traded, inter-married and related across the breadth and width of the Sayans."

Though linguists may disagree on the nature of the differences between these peoples, the facts remain that their linguistic backgrounds are Turkic in origin, that their ecological habitats and the reindeer they raised nomadically are essentially the same. As the breadth of this region of the Sayans and into Hovsgol of Mongolia covers a distance of less than 800 kilometers – and the annual range territory of reindeer herds can be as much as several hundred kilometers in and of themselves – it is very possible that these people have traded, inter-married and related across the breadth and width of the Sayans – and that their languages and ancestry are all closely related to the old Tuvan language and possibly original heritage.

— Daniel Plumley, Requiem or Recovery: The 21st Century Fate of the Reindeer-Herding Peoples of Geographical Central Asia

Part of the efforts to revive Soyot culture involve reintroducing reindeer-herding. In 1992, the region's administration, with the help of Ecologically Sustainable Development, a U.S. based NGO, purchased 63 reindeer from the neighboring Tofa and gave them to a Soyot cattle-breeding family living in an area where reindeer were traditionally herded. The family received two years of herder training from the Tofa, and were able to increase the reindeer herd to more than 100 head. Unfortunately, foreign support eventually dried up, and wolf predation and lack of experience from the Soyot herders led to the decline of the herd. In 1997, the 76 remaining deer were given to another family, which reorganized the herd with more care and vigilance, but a sudden episode of necrobacilliosis and frequent winter wolf attacks killed off more of the herd; in 1999 fewer than 60 reindeer remained, and only 12 survived a year later. In 2000, the reindeer-herding peoples of Mongolia and Russia were working on collaborative efforts to rebuild reindeer-herding. To date, there are approximately 20 Soyot engaged in reindeer-herding.

== Religion ==
The religion and shamanistic practices of the Soyots show influence from both Khalkha Mongols and Altai Turkic peoples. They share many cultural and religious similarities with the Tofa people, some of which are not seen in neighboring Turkic peoples. Soyots have been exposed to Mongolian and Tibetan Buddhism since the mid 1700s, but many only began to properly follow Buddhism in the 1800s and 1900s. According to Rassadin, Buryat Buddhist lamas attempted to put an end to Soyot shamanism.

== See also ==
- Reindeer in Russia
