= Alag-Shulun =

Alag-Shulun Алаг-Шулун
- Ulus
- Location within Republic of Buryatia Location within Russia
- Coordinates: 52°48′N 100°07′E
- Country: Russia
- Region: Republic of Buryatia
- District: Okinsky District
- Time zone: UTC+8:00

Alag-Shulun (Russian: Алаг-Шулун; Buryat: Алаг Шулуун, Alag Shuluun) is a rural locality (an ulus) in Okinsky District, Republic of Buryatia, Russia. The population was 168 as of 2010.

== Geography ==
Alag-Shulun is located 71 km northeast of Orlik (the district's administrative centre) by road. Khuzhir is the nearest rural locality.
