= Botogol =

Botogol Ботогол
- Settlement
- Location within Republic of Buryatia Location within Russia
- Coordinates: 52°22′N 100°44′E
- Country: Russia
- Region: Republic of Buryatia
- District: Okinsky District
- Time zone: UTC+8:00

Botogol (Russian: Ботогол) is a rural locality (a settlement) in Okinsky District, Republic of Buryatia, Russia. The population was 10 as of 2010. There are 4 streets.

== Geography ==
Botogol is located 45 km southeast of Orlik (the district's administrative centre) by road. Sorok is the nearest rural locality.
