= Sorok, Republic of Buryatia =

Sorok Сорок
- Ulus
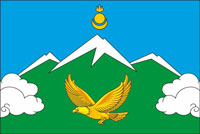
- Flag

- Location within Republic of Buryatia Location within Russia
- Coordinates: 52°19′N 100°10′E
- Country: Russia
- Region: Republic of Buryatia
- District: Okinsky District
- Time zone: UTC+8:00

Sorok (Russian: Сорок; Buryat: Сорог, Sorog) is a rural locality (an ulus) in Okinsky District, Republic of Buryatia, Russia. The population was 739 as of 2010. There are 24 streets.

== Geography ==
Sorok is located 41 km south of Orlik (the district's administrative centre) by road. Khurga is the nearest rural locality.
