= Subarya =

Subarya Субаря
- Ulus
- Location within Republic of Buryatia Location within Russia
- Coordinates: 52°06′N 99°56′E
- Country: Russia
- Region: Republic of Buryatia
- District: Okinsky District
- Time zone: UTC+8:00

Subarya (Russian: Субаря; Buryat: Һубаряа, Hubariaa) is a rural locality (an ulus) in Okinsky District, Republic of Buryatia, Russia. The population was 26 as of 2010. There are 4 streets.

== Geography ==
Subarya is located 32 km south of Orlik (the district's administrative centre) by road. Khurga is the nearest rural locality.
