= Zun-Kholba =

Zun-Kholba Зун-Холба
- Ulus
- Location within Republic of Buryatia Location within Russia
- Coordinates: 52°09′N 100°57′E
- Country: Russia
- Region: Republic of Buryatia
- District: Okinsky District
- Time zone: UTC+8:00

Zun-Kholba (Russian: Зун-Холба; Buryat: Зγγн Холбо, Züün Kholbo) is a rural locality (an ulus) in Okinsky District, Republic of Buryatia, Russia. The population was 29 as of 2010. There are 3 streets.

== Geography ==
Zun-Kholba is located 171 km southeast of Orlik (the district's administrative centre) by road. Samarta is the nearest rural locality.
