= Shasnur =

Shasnur Шаснур
- Ulus
- Location within Republic of Buryatia Location within Russia
- Coordinates: 52°40′N 99°30′E
- Country: Russia
- Region: Republic of Buryatia
- District: Okinsky District
- Time zone: UTC+8:00

Shasnur (Russian: Шаснур) is a rural locality (an ulus) in Okinsky District, Republic of Buryatia, Russia. The population was 50 as of 2010. There is 1 street.

== Geography ==
Shasnur is located 36 km northwest of Orlik (the district's administrative centre) by road. Khutel is the nearest rural locality.
