= Khara-Khuzhir =

Khara-Khuzhir Хара-Хужир
- Ulus
- Location within Republic of Buryatia Location within Russia
- Coordinates: 52°36′N 99°42′E
- Country: Russia
- Region: Republic of Buryatia
- District: Okinsky District
- Time zone: UTC+8:00

Khara-Khuzhir (Russian: Хара-Хужир; Buryat: Хара Хужар, Khara Khujar) is a rural locality (an ulus) in Okinsky District, Republic of Buryatia, Russia. The population was 214 as of 2010. There are 4 streets.

== Geography ==
Khara-Khuzhir is located 15 km north of Orlik (the district's administrative centre) by road. Orlik is the nearest rural locality.
