= Orlik Airport =

Airport in Orlik, Buryatia, Russia

- IATA: none; ICAO: none

Summary
- Airport type: Public / military
- Owner: Russian Federation
- Serves: Orlik
- Location: Orlik, Russia
- Opened: 1951
- Closed: 1993
- Passenger services ceased: 1992
- Coordinates: 52.507032°N 99.820448°E

Map
- Location within Republic of Buryatia Location within Russia

Orlik Airport (Buryat: Орлик Аэропорт) is a former airport in Buryatia, Russia. It provided a vital transportation link to the Okinsky District before the construction of a road from Mondy.

== History ==
Land was cleared for an airfield in the village of Orlik in 1951. The runway was designed to handle Antonov An-2 and Polikarpov Po-2 type aircraft for passenger, cargo and medical flights. Typically, this airfield served flights to Kyren. In 1970, a larger airport was built near the village of Sayany, some 28 km (17 mi) north of Orlik. This had a 1,200 m (3,900 ft) runway that was capable of handling larger aircraft such as the Lisunov Li-2 and Antonov An-24 that allowed direct flights to Ulan-Ude when weather permitted. As construction progressed of the Mondy-Orlik road, a transfer service between Orlik and Kyren was introduced in the 1980s using off-road vehicles during inclement weather to mitigate against the frequent closure of the airfields.

The two airports served Orlik simultaneously until the liquidation of Buryat Airlines in 1993. As of 2021, neither site remains in operation as a registered airport. The Orlik town runway still exists in the town but is not in use, while the longer "Oka" runway near Sayany is listed only as a "landing ground".
