= PANH =

Airline based in Ulan-Ude, Russia

IATA	ICAO	Call sign
PA	PAN	PANH
- Founded: 2013
- Hubs: Ulan-Ude - Baikal International Airport
- Focus cities: Irkutsk - International Airport Irkutsk
- Fleet size: 4
- Parent company: Bural
- Headquarters: Ulan-Ude, Russia

PANH is an airline based in Ulan-Ude, Russia. It operates trunk and regional passenger services. Its main base is Ulan-Ude Airport.

== History ==
The airline was established in 2013 as an affiliate of Bural.

== Fleet ==
The PANH fleet includes the following aircraft (at March 2013):

- 4 Cessna 208
- 3 Let L-410

== Destinations ==
Russia

- Buryatia
  - Bagdarin – Bagdarin Airport
  - Kurumkan – Kurumkan Airport
  - Kyren – Kyren Airport
  - Nizhneangarsk – Nizhneangarsk Airport
  - Orlik – Orlik Airport
  - Taksimo – Taksimo Airport
  - Ulan-Ude – Ulan-Ude Airport Main hub
  Irkutsk Oblast
  - Bratsk – Bratsk Airport
  - Irkutsk – Irkutsk Airport
  - Kazachinskoe – Kazachinskoe Airport
  - Ust-Ilimsk – Ust-Ilimsk Airport

== History ==
In 2016, the State Transport Leasing Company (STLC) seized five aircraft from the company owing to financial problems.
