= Kyren Airport =

Airport in Kyren, Buryatia, Russia

Kyren
- IATA: none; ICAO: UIIN

Summary
- Airport type: Public
- Location: Kyren
- Elevation AMSL: 2,290 ft / 698 m
- Coordinates: 51°40′42.25″N 102°9′32.72″E
- Interactive map of Kyren

Runways
| Direction | Length | | Surface |
| Direction | ft | m | Surface |
|---|---|---|---|
| | 5,823 | 1,775 | Asphalt |

Kyren Airport (Buryat: Кырен Аэропорт) is a civilian airport 1 km southeast of Kyren in Buryatia, Russia. The runway is asphalt.

== Destinations ==
| Airlines | Destinations |
|---|---|
| Bural operated by PANH | Ulan-Ude |

== See also ==
- List of airports in Russia
