= Omulyakh Bay =

Bay of the East Siberian Sea

- Омуляхская губа / Уомуллаах тамах
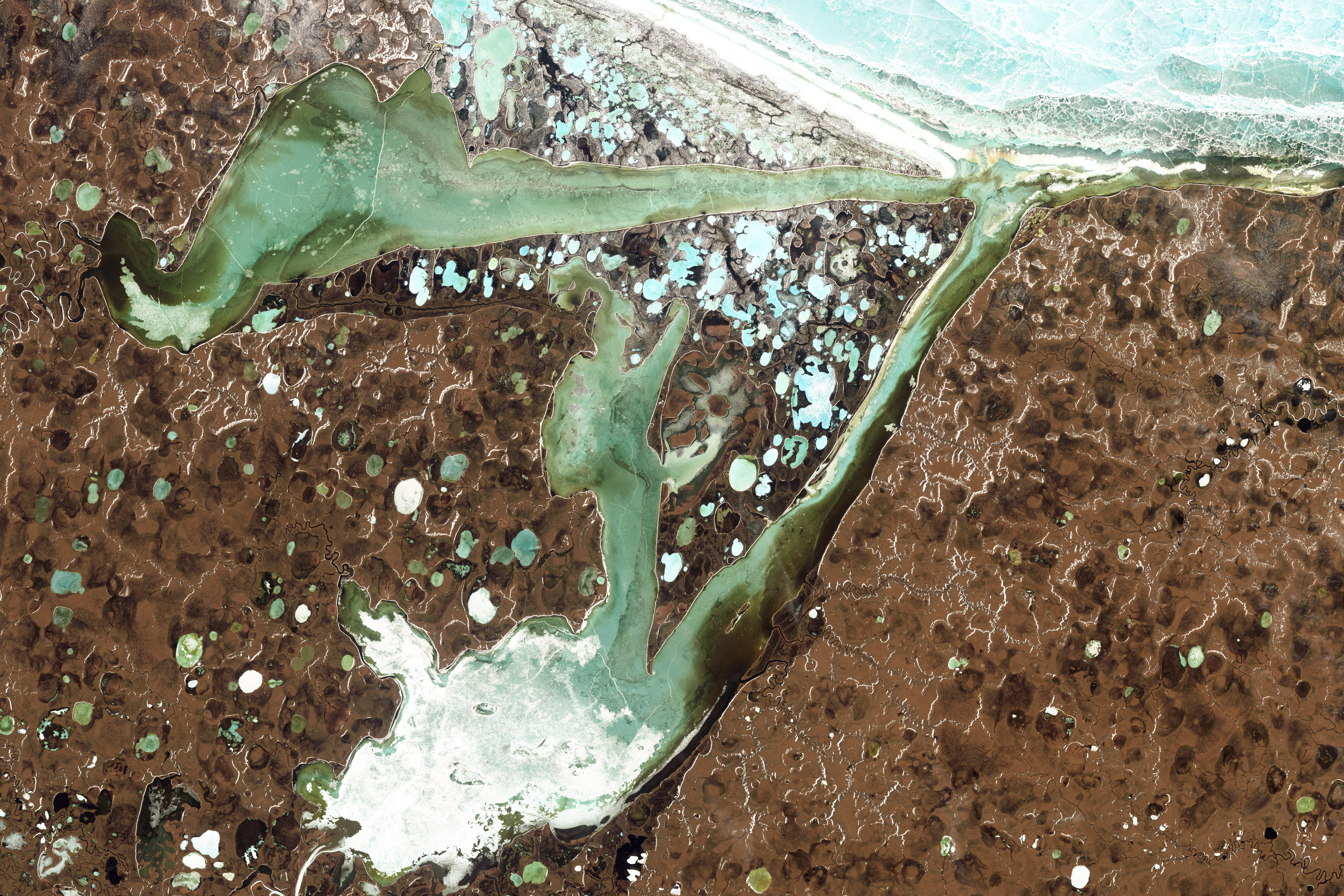
- Satellite image of the Omulyakh and Khroma bays.

- Location in Sakha Republic

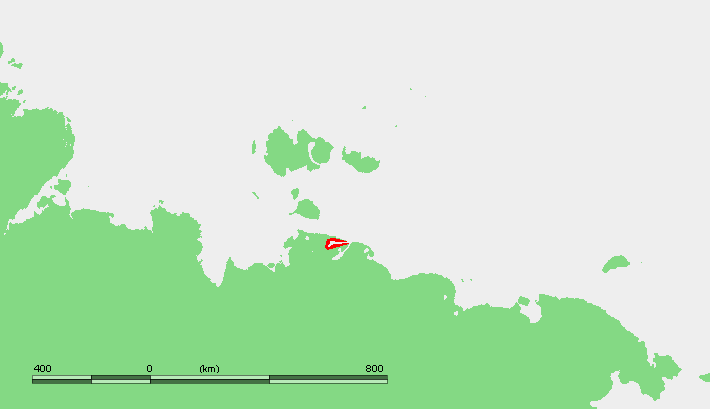
- Map showing the location of the bay
- Location: Far North
- Coordinates: 72.3333°N 145.2667°E
- Ocean/sea sources: East Siberian Sea
- Basin countries: Russia
- Max. length: 115 km (71 mi)
- Max. width: 25 km (16 mi)

The Omulyakh Bay (Russian: Омуляхская губа; Yakut: Уомуллаах тамах, romanized: Uomullaax tamax) is a bay of the East Siberian Sea in the Sakha Republic (Yakutia), Russian Federation.

== Geography ==
This bay is located in the shores of the East Siberian Lowland, west of the Sundrun River region and east of the Yana Bay.

Omulyakh Bay is open to the east through a narrow and straight channel and is 115 km in length. Starting from its mouth the bay widens inside, until it reaches a width of 25 km (16 mi). It has a curved inlet at its end. The Khroma Bay is very similar to this bay and lies only 40 km south. Both bays share the same mouth.

=== Hydrography ===
The 186 km (116 mi) long Kyuenekhtyakh (Кюэнехтях) and the 303 km (188 mi) long San-Yuryakh (Сан-Юрях) are the main rivers flowing into the bay. The bay is in an area of wetlands; lakes and marshes dot the whole landscape. Owing to is northerly location the Omullyakh Bay is covered with ice most of the year.
