= Khurga =

Khurga Хурга
- Ulus
- Location within Republic of Buryatia Location within Russia
- Coordinates: 52°22′N 99°54′E
- Country: Russia
- Region: Republic of Buryatia
- District: Okinsky District
- Time zone: UTC+8:00

Khurga (Russian: Хурга) is a rural locality (an ulus) in Okinsky District, Republic of Buryatia, Russia. The population was 117 as of 2010. There are 10 streets.

== Geography ==
Khurga is located 19 km south of Orlik (the district's administrative centre) by road. Orlik is the nearest rural locality.
