= Kurumkan Airport =

Airport in Kurumkan, Buryatia, Russia

- IATA: none; ICAO: UI69

Summary
- Airport type: Public / Military
- Owner: Russian Federation
- Operator: JSC "Domestic Airport Kurumkan"
- Serves: Kurumkan
- Location: Kurumkan, Russia
- Coordinates: 54.30989°N 110.296888°E

Map

Kurumkan Airport (Buryat: Хурамхан Аэропорт) is located in Kurumkan in Buryatia, Russian Federation. Re-opened in 2013, services operate to Baikal International Airport.

== History ==
The Kurumkan Airport was constructed during the Soviet era, as an airport for seasonal beach tourism around Lake Baikal. In 1992 the airport was partially closed, and closed altogether in 2001 due to financial difficulties of the Bural airline. In 2013 the airport was re-opened, when PANH opened the new regular flight to Ulan-Ude.

== Airlines and destinations ==
Airlines	Destinations
Bural operated by PANH	Ulan-Ude
