= Bokson =

Bokson Боксон
- Settlement
- Location within Republic of Buryatia Location within Russia
- Coordinates: 52°09′N 100°19′E
- Country: Russia
- Region: Republic of Buryatia
- District: Okinsky District
- Time zone: UTC+8:00

Bokson (Russian: Боксон) is a rural locality (a settlement) in Okinsky District, Republic of Buryatia, Russia. The population was 122 as of 2010. There are 10 streets.

== Geography ==
Bokson is located 66 km southeast of Orlik (the district's administrative centre) by road. Sorok is the nearest rural locality.
