= Sayany, Republic of Buryatia =

Sayany Саяны
- Selo
- Location within Republic of Buryatia Location within Russia
- Coordinates: 52°41′N 99°40′E
- Country: Russia
- Region: Republic of Buryatia
- District: Okinsky District
- Time zone: UTC+8:00

Sayany (Russian: Саяны) is a rural locality (a selo) in Okinsky District, Republic of Buryatia, Russia. The population was 408 as of 2010. There are 7 streets.

== Geography ==
Sayany is located 28 km north of Orlik (the district's administrative centre) by road. Khara-Khuzhir is the nearest rural locality.
