= Khroma =

Khroma Хрома
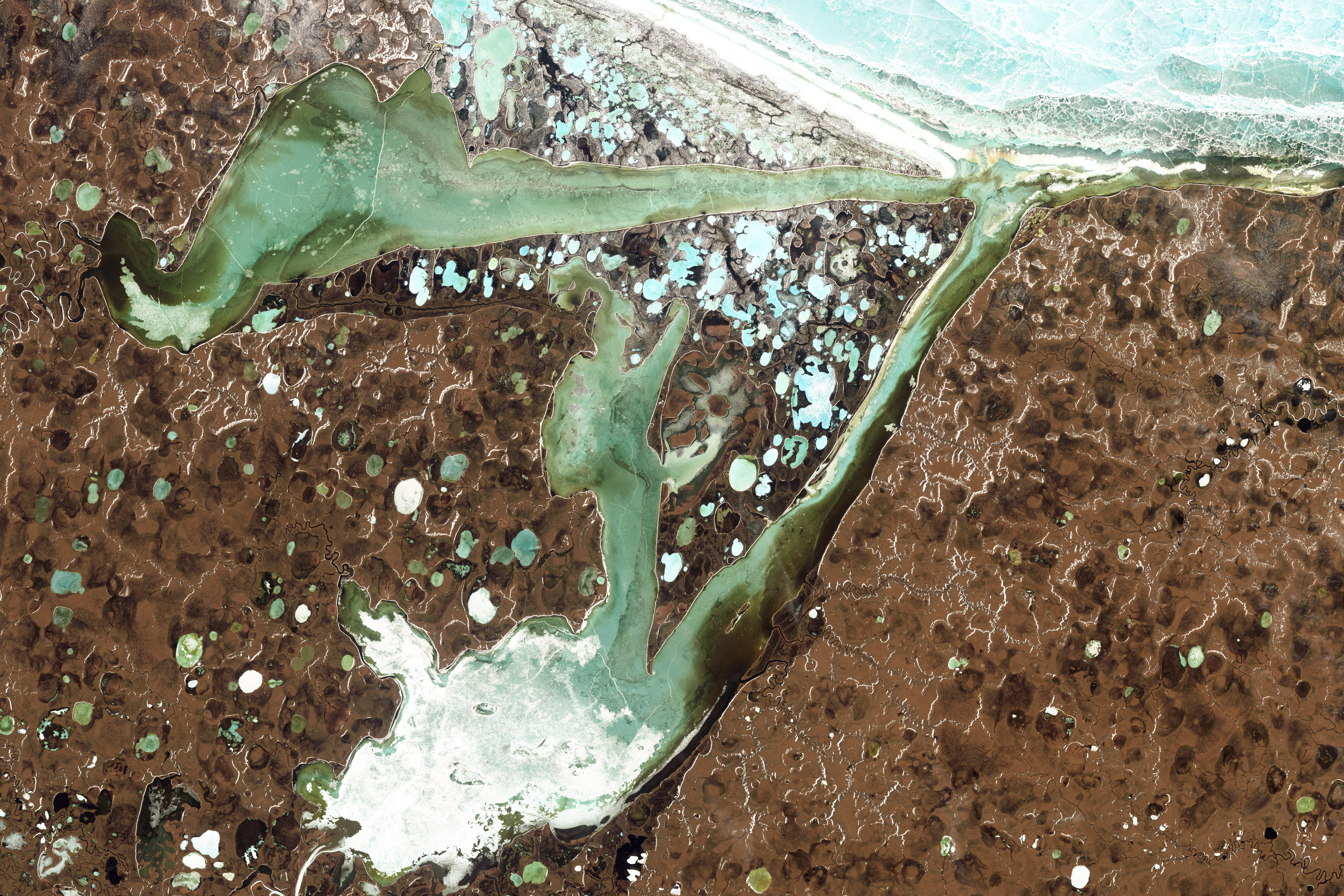
- Khroma estuary below and Omulyakh Bay above

- Mouth location in Yakutia, Russia

Location
- Country: Russia
- Location: Sakha

Physical characteristics
- Source
  - location: Polousny Range
  - coordinates: 69°59′37″N 141°56′26″E
  - elevation: 88 m (289 ft)
- Mouth
  - location: East Siberian Sea
  - coordinates: 71°41′31″N 144°59′50″E
  - elevation: 0 m (0 ft)
- Length: 685 km (426 mi)
- Basin size: 19,700 km^{2} (7,600 sq mi)

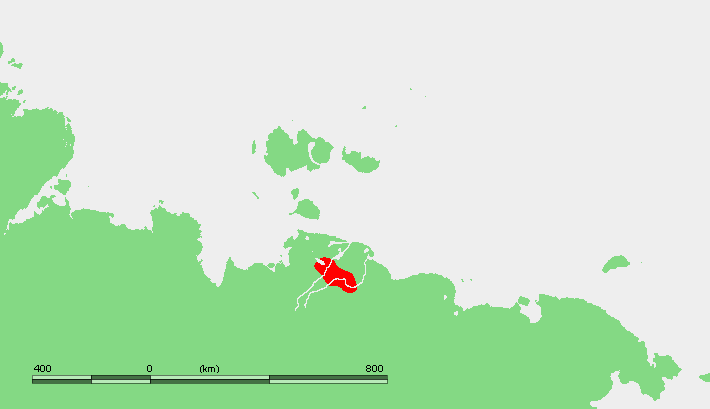
Location of the Khroma-Sundrun Interfluvial Area; the Khroma is on the left.

The Khroma (Russian: Хрома) is a river in the Sakha Republic (Yakutia) of the Russian Federation. It is 685 kilometres (426 mi) long, and has a drainage basin of 19,700 square kilometres (7,600 sq mi).

== Course ==
The source of the Khroma is at the confluence of the Tamteken and the Nemalak-Arangas, flowing down from the Polousny Range. It crosses the Yana-Indigirka Lowland, part of the greater East Siberian Lowland. It flows across the tundra roughly northeastwards and finally it has its mouth west of the mouth of the Lapcha in Khroma Bay which is connected with the East Siberian Sea. Owing to its extreme northerly location the Khroma River freezes up in early October and remains icebound until June.

=== Tributaries ===
The main tributary of the Khroma is the 314 km (195 mi) long Yuryung-Ulakh (Юрюнг-Уулаах) that joins its left bank 9.4 km (5.8 mi) before its mouth.

== Wetlands ==
The Kytalyk Wetlands, located between the Khroma and the Sundrun (Khroma-Sundrun Interfluvial Area) is an ecologically important area, providing a favorable habitat for many rare animals. The region is practically uninhabited and full of lakes and marshes. Wild reindeer, Siberian cranes, Canadian cranes, marsh sandpipers and Ross's gulls are abundant in the Khroma River wetlands.

The lesser white-fronted goose, brent goose, Bewick's swan and the spectacled eider are also found in the Khroma-Sundrun Interfluvial Area.

Gold and tin mining upriver are affecting the ecology of the region by destroying fish and bird habitat.

== See also ==
- List of rivers of Russia
