= Uryung-Ulakh =

River in Yakutia, Russia

Uryung-Ulakh Юрюнг-Уулаах / Үрүҥ Уулаах
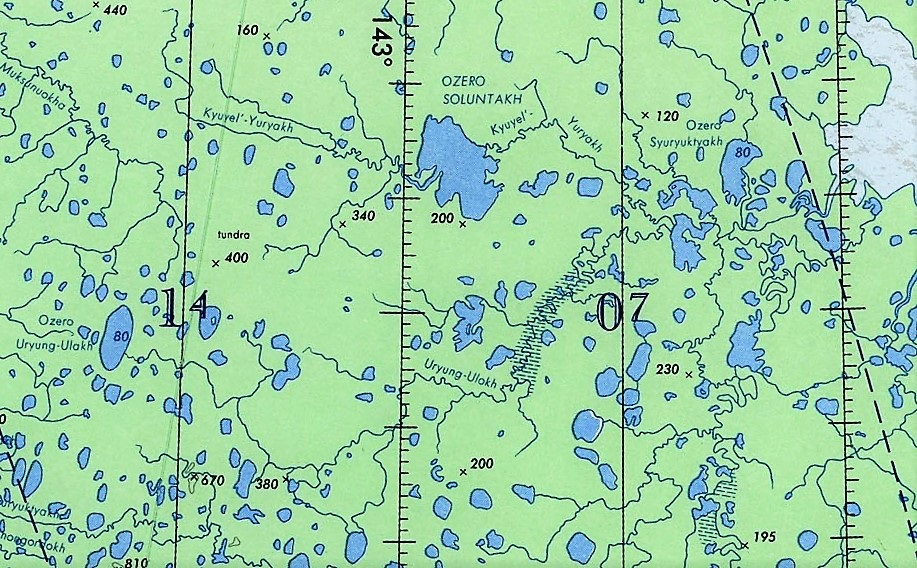
- Course of the Uryung-Ulakh ONC map section

- Mouth location in Yakutia, Russia

Location
- Country: Russia

Physical characteristics
- Source
  - location: Lake Uryung-Ulakh
  - coordinates: 71°27′32″N 141°41′43″E
  - elevation: 15 metres (49 ft)
- Mouth: Khroma
  - coordinates: 71°39′03″N 144°51′31″E
  - elevation: 0 metres (0 ft)
- Length: 314 km (195 mi)
- Basin size: 6,210 km^{2} (2,400 sq mi)

Basin features
- Progression: Khroma → East Siberian Sea

The Uryung-Ulakh or Yuryung-Ulakh (Russian: Урюнг-Улах or Юрюнг-Уулаах; Yakut: Үрүҥ Уулаах, Ürün Uulaax) is a river in the Sakha Republic (Yakutia), Russia. It has a length of 314 kilometres (195 mi) and a drainage basin area of 6,210 square kilometres (2,400 mi^{2}).

The river flows north of the Arctic Circle, across territories of the East Siberian Lowland in Allaikhovsky District marked by permafrost. There are no settlements along its course.

== Course ==
The Uryung-Ulakh is the main tributary of the Khroma. It has its sources in the lake of the same name, a fairly large lake of the southeastern part of the Yana-Indigirka Lowland located to the south of the Muksunuokha basin. The river heads first roughly southeastwards across a tundra area of swamps and numerous small lakes. After a long stretch it bends and meanders in an northeastern direction until it meets the western shore of lake Usun-Ulakh-Tubata (Усун-Уулаах-Тубата), south of the mouth of the Kyuyol-Yuryakh in the same lake. The Uryung-Ulakh then flows out of the lake from the northeastern shore, meandering strongly eastwards, joining the left bank of the Khroma 9.4 km (5.8 mi) from its mouth in the Khroma Bay of the East Siberian Sea.

=== Tributaries ===
The main tributary of the Uryung-Ulakh is the 50 km (31 mi) long Abasylakh-Seene (Абаасылаах-Сээнэ) on the left. There are over 1,600 lakes in its basin. The river is frozen between late September and mid June.

== Fauna ==
The Uryung-Ulakh is one of the sites providing a breeding place for the Siberian crane, a critically endangered species.

== See also ==
- List of rivers of Russia
