= Reindeer in Russia =

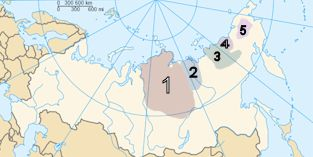
Map of R.t. sibiricus herds in Russia based on Russell and Gunn November 2013 NOAA. 1. Taimyr Herd 2. Lena-Olene 3. Yana-Indigirka herd 4. Sundrun herd 5. Chukotka herd

Reindeer in Russia include tundra and forest reindeer and are subspecies of Rangifer tarandus. Tundra reindeer include the Novaya Zemlya (R.t.pearsoni) and Sápmi (R.t. tarandus) subspecies and the Siberian tundra reindeer (R.t. sibiricus).

== Novaya Zemlya reindeer ==
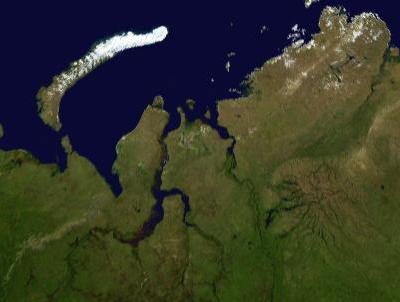
Novaya Zemlya reindeer R.t.pearsoni

The subspecies of reindeer, the Novaya Zemlya (R.t.pearsoni). on the islands of the Novaya Zemlya, were herded by the Nenets. Novaya Zemlya is an archipelago in the Arctic Ocean in the North of Russia and the extreme Northeast of Europe, the easternmost point of Europe lying at Cape Flissingsky on the Northern island. The indigenous population (from 1872 to the 1950s when it was resettled to the mainland) consisted of about 50–300 Nenetses who subsisted mainly on reindeer herding, fishing, trapping, polar bear hunting and seal hunting.

== Sami reindeer ==
A subspecies of reindeer, R.t. tarandus, a semi-domesticated reindeer are widespread in Sápmi. Reindeer herds visit the grasslands of the Kola Peninsula in summer.

=== Sami people and reindeer herding ===
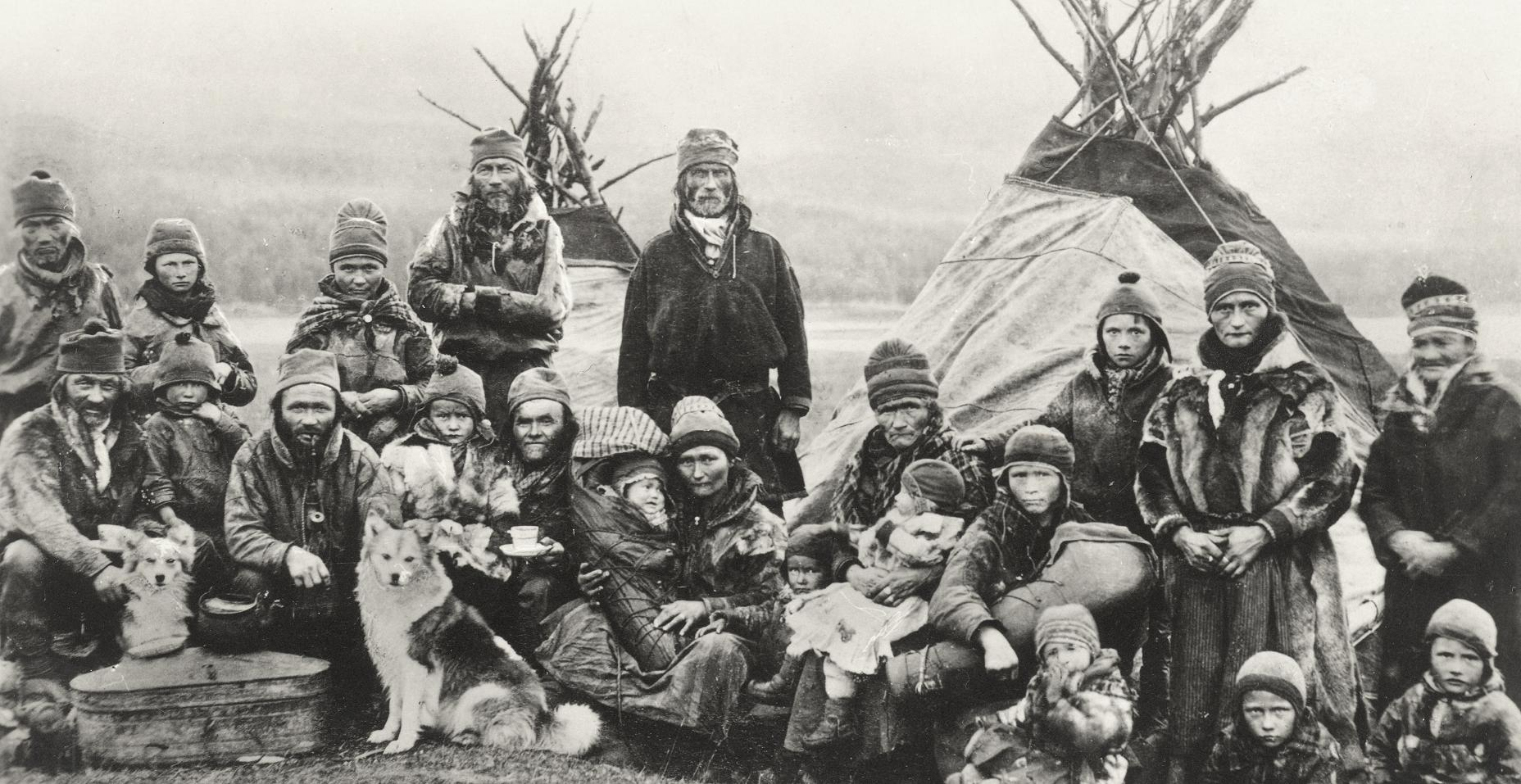
Nomadic Sami people with reindeer skin tents and clothing in 1900–1920.

By the end of the 1st millennium CE, the Kola Peninsula was settled only by the Sami people. who were engaged mostly in reindeer herding and fishing. The Sami people are one people living in four countries. There are about 2000 Sami in Russia, the only country to keep exact count. They are an indigenous Finno-Ugric-speaking people inhabiting the Arctic area of Sápmi, which today encompasses parts of the Kola Peninsula of Russia, far northern Norway, Sweden, Finland and the border area between south and middle Sweden and Norway. Their best-known means of livelihood was semi-nomadic reindeer herding. The Sami are the only indigenous people of Scandinavia recognized and protected under the international conventions of indigenous peoples, and are hence the northernmost indigenous people of Europe. By the end of the 19th century, the indigenous Sami population had been mostly forced north by the Russians and the Komi and Nenets people who migrated here to escape a reindeer disease epidemics in their home lands. The Sami peoples were subject to forced collectivization, with more than half of their reindeer herds collectivized in 1928–1930. The collectivization efforts in the 1930s lead to the concentration of the reindeer herds in kolkhozes (collective farms), which, in turn, were further consolidated into a few large-scale state farms in the late 1950s–early 1970s. In addition, the traditional Sami herding practices were phased out in favor of the more economically profitable Komi approach, which emphasized permanent settlements over free herding. Since the Sami culture is strongly tied to the herding practices, this resulted in the Sami people gradually losing their language and traditional herding knowledge. Most Sami were forced to settle in the village of Lovozero; those resisting the collectivization were subject to forced labor or death. Various forms of repression against the Sami continued until Stalin's death in 1953. In the 1990s, 40% of the Sami lived in urbanized areas, although some herd reindeer across much of the region.

== Siberian tundra reindeer ==
Siberian tundra reindeer (R.t. sibiricus) "may be divided further into regional forms: the Taimyr Bulun, Yano-Indigirka and Novosibirsk islands (Egorov, 1971)."

There are three large herds of migratory tundra wild reindeer in central Siberia's Yakutia region: Lena-Olenek, Yana-Indigirka and Sundrun herds. While the population of the Lena-Olenek herd is stable, the others are declining.

Further east again, the Chukotka herd is also in decline. In 1971 there were 587,000 animals. They recovered after a severe decline in 1986 to only 32,200 individuals, but their numbers fell again. According to Kolpashikov, by 2009 there were less than 70,000.

=== Taimyr reindeer herd ===
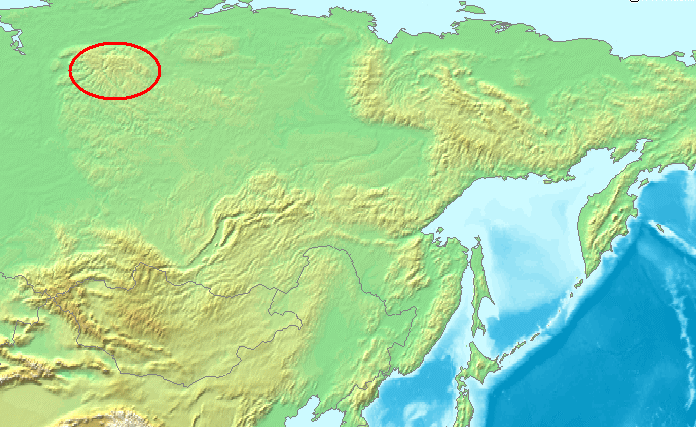
Putoran Mountains Taimyr reindeer winter taiga pastures

The Taimyr reindeer herd, a migrating tundra reindeer (R.t. sibiricus), is the largest reindeer herd in the world. In the 1950s there were 110,000. In 2000 the herd increased to 1,000,000 but by 2006, there were 700,000 animals, and 600,000 by 2016. The reduction in numbers is partly due to climate change, along with industrial development and other human activity.

The Putorana Nature Reserve, covering 1,887,251 hectares (4,663,500 acres), (a World Heritage Site since 2010), was established in 1988 to protect Taimyr reindeer herd as well as snow sheep. The reserve is located on the Putorana Plateau, a mountainous area at the northwestern edge of the Central Siberian Plateau, to the south of Taymyr Peninsula. Taimyr tundra reindeer migrate to winter taiga pastures in Evenkia and Putoran Mountains. in the forest-tundra and taiga from the river Taz in the west and to the Anabar in the east.

"In the 1960s up to 80% of reindeer wintered in the Putoran Mountains, but in the late 1970s most animals moved to the mountain taiga of the northern Evenkia and the western region of Yakutia. The shift in winter distribution occurred after the increase in population size, which resulted in deterioration of forage (Kuksoc, 1981). Lineitzev's (1983) observations at the biological station at Ayan Lake in the Putoran Mountains revealed the pattern of reindeer distribution in the piedmont. After some critical density was exceeded, migration was initiated through the Putoran plateau to the south. The new wintering grounds of the Taimyr reindeer are 1000-1200 km away from the calving grounds, and consequently the reindeer reach the Taimyr lowland later. The reindeer linger where the snow melts earlier on the winter mountain ranges. Then the reindeer have to migrate quickly but frequently do not reach the rivers before breakup. Then the reindeer have to stop at the river barrier to calve along the right bank of the Pyasina River and at the bend of the middle flow (central section) of the Agape River (Kuksov, 1981). In years with a warm autumn, reindeer were observed to linger on the southern Taimyr tundra until December (up to 100 thousand head). Those animals headed for new winter ranges at the left bank of the Enisei River, and when the ice conditions prevented them from crossing, they dispersed southward along the Enisei bank up to Turukhansk (Yakushkin et aL, 1970).

— Baskin 1986

== Forest reindeer ==
"Flerov (1952) and Sokolov (1959) divided forest reindeer into Siberian (R.t. valentinae) and Okhotsk (R.t. phylarchus). Egorov (1971), Vodopyanov (1970), Stremilov (1973) and Mukhachev (1981), however, inferred from their studies that the forest reindeer of Evenkia, Trans-Baikal Territory, Southern Yakutia and Far East are the same subspecies."

Wild forest reindeer, are similar to the woodland caribou in North America. The male wild forest reindeer weighs 150 kg (330 lb)-200 kg (440 lb) and the female 60 kg (130 lb)-100 kg (220 lb).

As the ice sheets melted 10,000 years ago, wild reindeer reached Fennoscandia from the eastern side of the Baltic Sea. Their range reached its peak in the 1600s-1700s. At that time wild forest reindeer inhabited nearly the "entire Eastern Fennoscandian and Northwestern Russian areas all the way to Ilmajärvi." By the eighteenth century their range was being reduced and fragmented. They were "hunted to extinction in Finland in the late 1910s, but continued to live in the remote backwoods of Russian Karelia." By the early 2000s "the southern boundary of the range of wild forest reindeer in Karelia has retreated to the north, and the population is fragmented." Today the wild forest reindeer is found in Russia, in Kom and Arkhangelsk, as well as Karelia.

The wild forest reindeer is an increasingly rare species in most of Russia. Mountain reindeer in the Kirov area are extremely endangered. Many are listed in the Red Book as endangered: Republik of Komi: wild mountain reindeer; Krasnoyarsk area: R. t. valentinae, two subspecies: Angara stock, Altai-Sayan stock; Altai Republic: Siberian forest reindeer, R.t.valentinae; Buryatia Republic: Mountain reindeer; Kamchatka region: Ohota orkamchatka forest reindeer, R. t. phylarchus; Sakhalin area: Ohota forest reindeer, R. t. phylarchus.

Other populations are listed as vulnerable and rare including the Republic of Karelia: Wild forest reindeer, Rangifer tarandus fennicus; Tjumen area: Mountain reindeer, Rangifer tarandus; Kemerovo area: R.t. angustifrons; Irkutsk area: Siberian forest reindeer R. t. valentinae, wild forest reindeer subspecies Sayano-Altai stock; Khakassia stock; Tyva Republic: Siberian forest reindeer, R. t. angustifrons; Magadan area: Ohota forest reindeer, R. t. phylarchus.

== Reindeer husbandry ==
According to Sev’yan I. Vainshtein, Sayan reindeer herding "is the oldest form of reindeer herding" and is associated with the "earliest domestication of the reindeer by the Samoyedic taiga population" of the Sayan Mountains at the "turn of the first millenium A.D... The Sayan region was apparently the origin of the economic and cultural complex of reindeer hunters-herdsmen that we now see among the various Evenki groups and the peoples of the Sayan area." The Sayan ethnic groups still live almost exclusively in the area of the Eastern Sayan mountains.

There are over two dozen regions where reindeer husbandry has been part of the economy in Russia.

Domestic "reindeer are sharply distinct in conformation and colouration and their morphological and ecological characteristics vary regionally. Like their wild conspecifics, regional variation in domestic reindeer may be explained by environmental conditions."

== East Siberian Sea ==
The coast of the East Siberian Sea was inhabited for many centuries by the native peoples of northern Siberia such as Yukaghirs and Chukchi (eastern areas). These tribes were engaged in reindeer husbandry, fishing and hunting and reindeer sledges were essential for transport and hunting. They were joined and absorbed by Evens and Evenks around the 2nd century and later, between 9th and 15th centuries, by much more numerous Yakuts. All those tribes moved north from the Baikal Lake area avoiding confrontations with Mongols. Whereas they all practised shamanism, they spoke different languages.

== Soyot reindeer herding ==
Vainshtein undertook expeditions to study reindeer-herders including the Soyot.

In 1926, the ethnologist Bernhard Eduardovich Petri, (1884-1937), led the first anthropological expedition into the Soyot reindeer-herding region. Petri described a difficult period in Russian history claiming that Soyot reindeer herding was a "dying branch of the economy." Pavlinskaya argued that "later research and data collected from Soyot elders show that the herding tradition easily overcame the period’s difficulties and endured until the middle of the 20th century, when the government interfered."

In 2000 reindeer peoples of Mongolia and Russia were working on collaborative efforts to rebuild reindeer-herding.

Plumley suggested that the Soyot of Buryatia's Okinsky Region, the Tofilar of Irkutsk Oblast, the Todja-Tuvans of the Republic of Tuva in Russia, and the Dukha of Mongolia's Hovsgol Province, who are "cultures of reindeer-habitat" in Central Asia may well "have traded, inter-married and related across the breadth and width of the Sayans."

== See also ==
- Indigenous peoples

== Additional sources ==
Anderson, David G. "Identity and Ecology in Arctic Siberia: The Number One Reindeer Brigade (Oxford Studies in Social and Cultural Anthropology)." (2000).

Konstantinov, Yulian. “Memory of Lenin Ltd.: Reindeer-Herding Brigades on the Kola Peninsula.” Anthropology Today, vol. 13, no. 3, 1997, pp. 14–19. JSTOR, JSTOR, www.jstor.org/stable/2783133.

Konstantinov, Yulian. Conversations with Power: Soviet and post-Soviet developments in the reindeer husbandry part of the Kola Peninsula. Acta Universitatis Upsaliensis, 2015.

Stammler, Florian. "Reindeer nomads meet the market." Münster: LIT Verlag (2005).

Vitebsky, Piers. The reindeer people: living with animals and spirits in Siberia. Houghton Mifflin Harcourt, 2006.
