= Ust-Ilimsk Airport =

Ust-Ilimsk
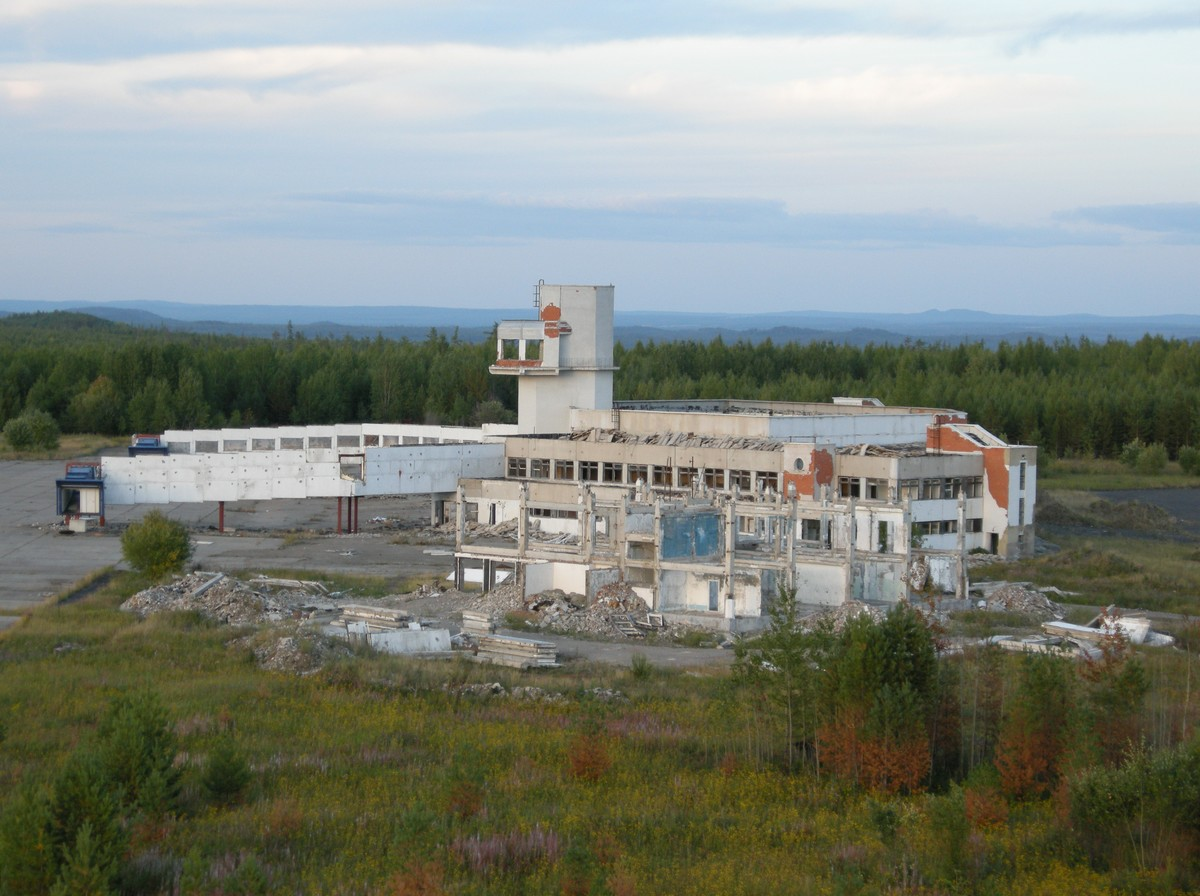
- IATA: UIK; ICAO: UIBS

Summary
- Airport type: Public
- Location: Ust-Ilimsk
- Elevation AMSL: 1,339 ft (408 m)
- Coordinates: 58°8′0″N 102°33′24″E
- Interactive map of Ust-Ilimsk

Runways
Direction	Length		Surface
Direction	ft	m	Surface
07/25	9,842	3,000	Concrete

Ust-Ilimsk Airport (IATA: UIK, ICAO: UIBS) is a large airport in Irkutsk Oblast, Russia located 17 km northwest of Ust-Ilimsk. It was a major regional facility capable of handling all sizes of airliners. The airport has a very large concrete apron with 500 x 200 M tarmac.

The airport was closed in 2001 due to bankruptcy, but reopened in 2013 for flights to Irkutsk. Because of the smaller aircraft needed for the short length of flight to that destination, the operational runway area was reduced to 1000 metres. On the airport location a module passenger building with security block and flight control center have been installed to enable ground operations which were not possible in the earlier-destroyed buildings.

== History ==
Airport started off in 1980.

- 1980 - First flight Ust-Ilimsk - Irkutsk with Yakovlev 40.
- 1988 - First Tupolev Tu-154 landed.
- 1989. = Hotel was built.
- 1993 - New passenger building started off
- 1994 - First Boeing 757-200 landed in the airport location
- 1995 - First in Syberia passenger boarding bridges appeared
- 1997 - Runway was increased to 3100 metres by Yugoslavia specialists.
- 2001 - Last passenger flight to Irkutsk city.
- 2001 - Last cargo flight

In 2002 airport was closed after its debts reached 40 million rubles. In 2005 airport went into bankruptcy. All airport infrastructure was destroyed. Rebuilding will require much money. Part of the property was sold during bankruptcy, and part was given to Ust-Ilimsk city. Security was absent since 2002, all other property was stolen.
Reanimation of airport was discussed a lot of times by Moscow companies, Lufthansa. But the companies declined.

- 2013 - New company State enterprise "Runaway" was officially registered [original document - МУП «Посадочная площадка (Аэропорт) города Усть-Илимска»]
- 2013 - The local Parliament of Ust-Ilimsk declared the airport infrastructure as city property. [originally - № 57/392 "О принятии недвижимого имущества из муниципальной собственности муниципального образования «Усть-Илимский район» в муниципальную собственность муниципального образования «город Усть-Илимск» объекты аэропорта были приняты в собственность города.]

On August 13, 2013 flights to Irkutsk resumed and the airport's eleven-year dormancy ended.

== Airlines and destinations ==
Airlines	Destinations
PANH	Irkutsk, Ulan-Ude
SiLA	Irkutsk

== See also ==
- List of airports in Russia
