= Bural =

Airline based in Ulan-Ude, Russia

IATA	ICAO	Call sign
BU	BUN	BURAL
- Founded: 1993
- Ceased operations: 2016 (flights ceased); 2017 (certificate cancelled)
- Hubs: Ulan-Ude Airport
- Fleet size: 13
- Destinations: 6
- Parent company: Buryat Airlines Aircompany
- Headquarters: Ulan-Ude, Russia

Bural was an airline based in Ulan-Ude, Russia. It operated trunk and regional passenger services. Its main base was Ulan-Ude Airport.

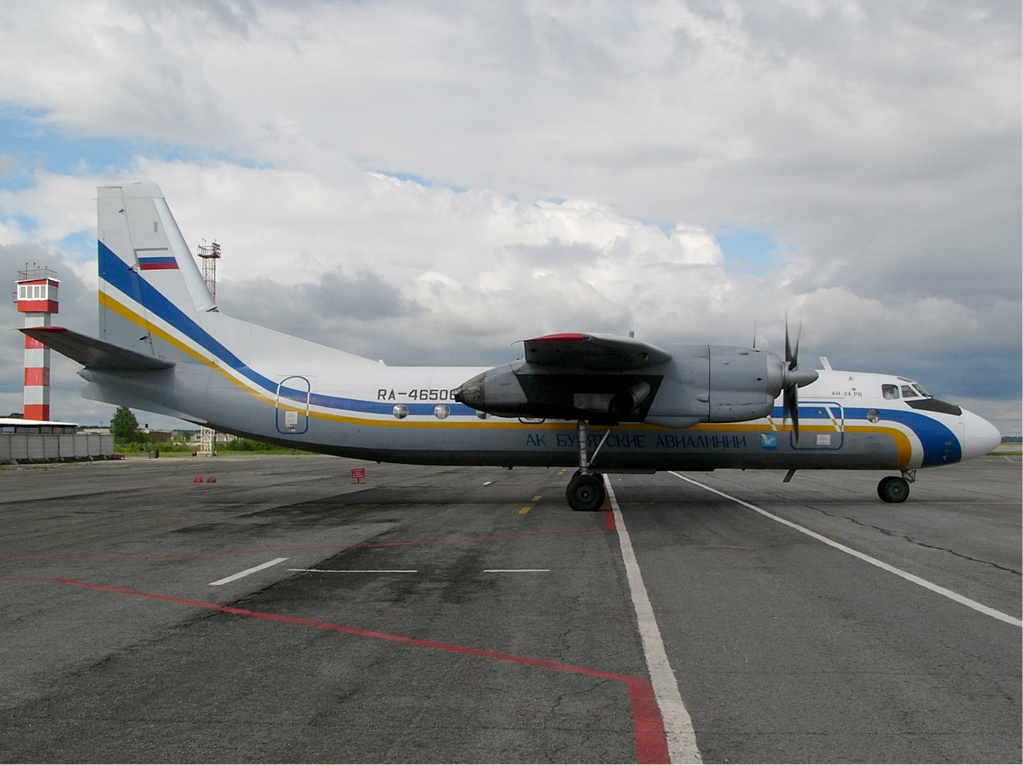
Bural Antonov An-24RV

== History ==
The airline was established in 1933 as Buryatia Air Enterprise. It became independent from state control in 1993 and was formerly known as Buryatia Airlines. Since 2002, the airline has curtailed its operations including services to Moscow-Domodedovo; and retiring many of its aircraft including Tu-154M, Il-62M, L-410 and An-26, due to large financial losses. The airline went defunct in 2017, due to failure to follow the laws in the technical service of the aircraft. The regional flights across Buryatia to Taksimo and Nizhneangarsk were served by Angara Airlines instead.

== Fleet ==
The Bural fleet included the following aircraft in August 2015:

Aircraft type	Active	Orders	Notes
Antonov An-24	1	0	
Mil Mi-8T	5	0	
Sukhoi Superjet 100	2	15	8 aircraft had been leased from Centre-South and Atlas Jet.

== Destinations ==
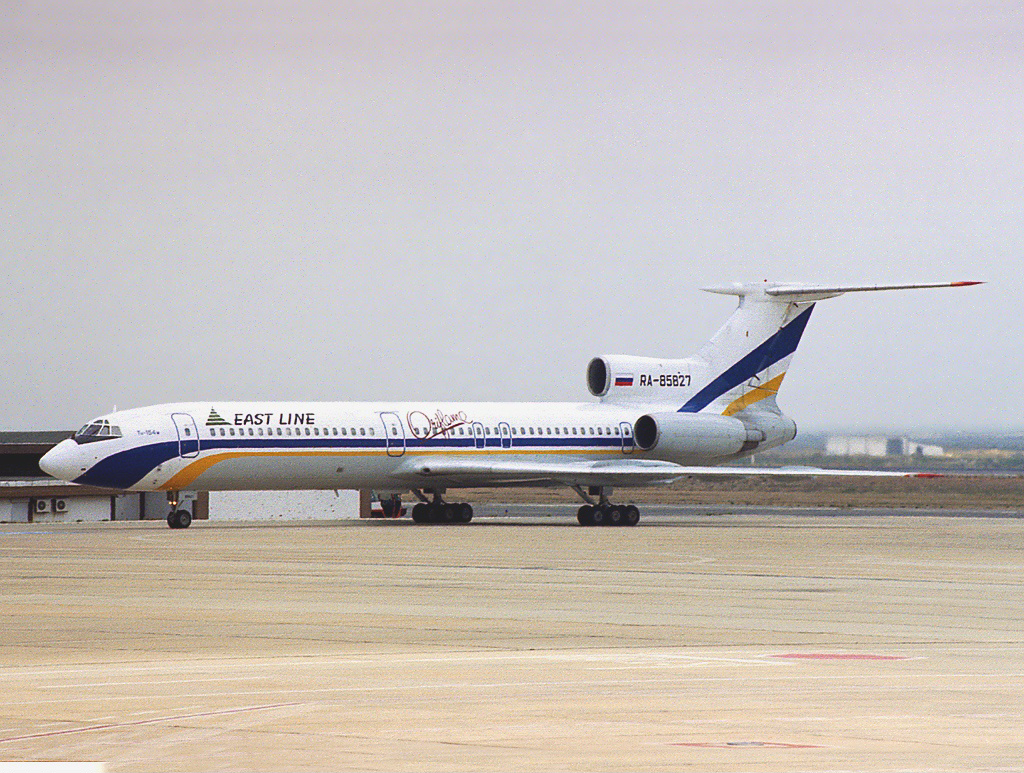
One of the previously operated Tupolev Tu-154M in Bural (colours of Buryat flag are still there), which went to East Line Airlines and then to S7 Airlines.

Russia

- Bagdarin — Bagdarin Airport
- Irkutsk - Irkutsk Airport
- Kyzyl - Kyzyl Airport (operated for Center-South to Moscow)
- Nizhneangarsk — Nizhneangarsk Airport
- Taksimo — Taksimo Airport
- Ulan-Ude — Ulan-Ude Airport Hub

== Codeshares ==
The airlines has codeshares with:

- Centre-South (suspended)
- PANH (as affiliate)
- Yakutia Airlines

== Incidents ==
1 October 2010 - AN-2 Uakit - Bagdarin - In flight at an altitude of 2,300 meters with very poor weather conditions and too little fuel left, the pilot decided to carry out an emergency landing. Passengers and copilot received injuries of varying severity when leaving the aircraft.
