= Center-South =

Russian passenger airline

| IATA | ICAO | Call sign |
|---|---|---|
| DF | CTS | CENTER-SOUTH |
- Founded: 1993
- Ceased operations: 1 October 2015
- Hubs: Belgorod International Airport
- Secondary hubs: Baikal International Airport; Simferopol International Airport; Vnukovo International Airport
- Focus cities: Tolmachevo Airport; Roschino International Airport
- Fleet size: 3
- Destinations: 57
- Headquarters: Krasnoyarsk, Russia
- Key people: Alexei I. Hamnagadaev (Manager)
- Website: center-south.ru

Center-South («Центр-Юг», "Tsentr-Yug") was a Russian passenger airline based in Belgorod.

== History ==
In early 2014, the airline received the first of two Sukhoi Superjet 100 aircraft, which was due to be operated under a lease agreement for AtlasJet on charter flights. The airline was the official carrier of the volleyball club VC Lokomotiv-Belogorie.

On 17 September 2015, Rosaviation announced the suspension of Centre-South Airlines' operating certificate due to several violations. Following the rules, if the airline plans to have a wide range of flights (as Center-South has), it needs to have not less than 8 aircraft with capacity of not less than 50 people, however, the airline has only five aircraft of the required type, including two Tupolev Tu-134 and three Sukhoi Superjet 100. The aircraft had also never been checked for damages.

== Fleet ==
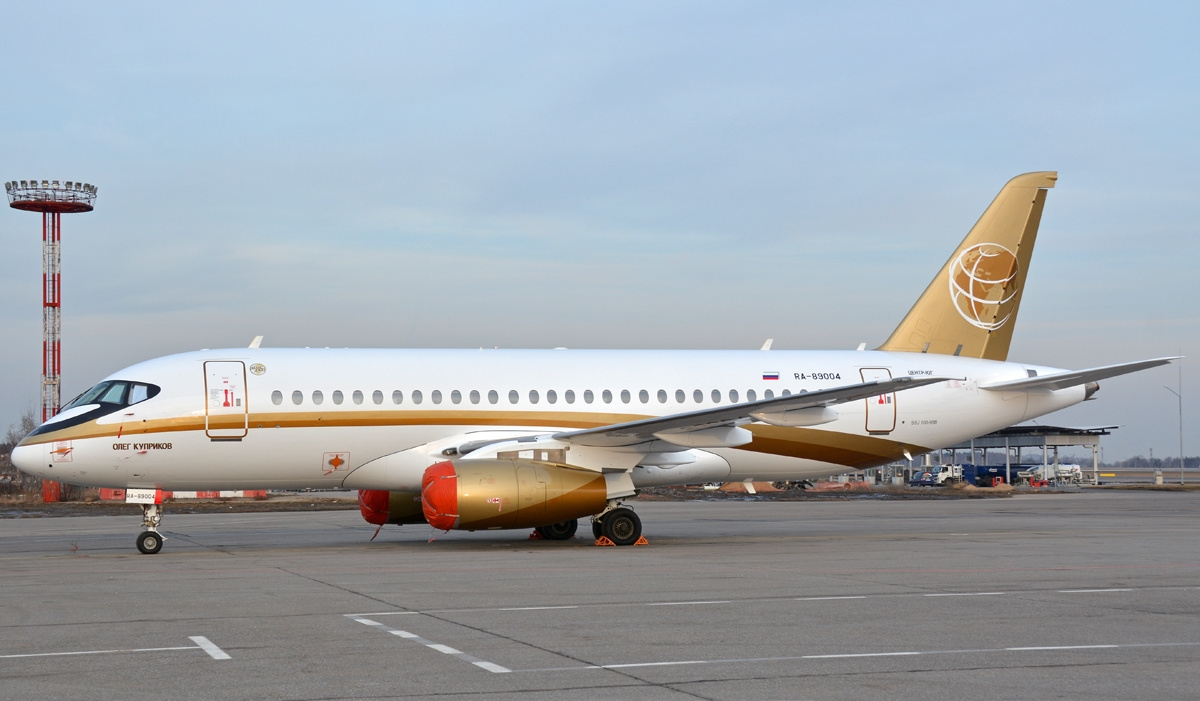
Centre-South Sukhoi Superjet 100

The Center-South fleet comprises the following aircraft (as of August 2016):

| Aircraft type | Active | Notes |
|---|---|---|
| Sukhoi Superjet 100B | 1 | |
| Tupolev Tu-134AK | 1 | |
| Tupolev Tu-134B3 | 1 | |

The airline fleet previously included the following aircraft:

- 2 Yakovlev Yak-40
