= Sevyan Vainshtein =

Russian ethnographer, archaeologist, and historian (1926–2008)

- Севьян Вайнштейн
- Born: 12 April 1926; Moscow, RSFSR, Soviet Union
- Died: 16 October 2008 (aged 82); Moscow, Russia
- Education: MSU Faculty of History
- Awards: Honoured Scholar of Russia

Sevʹyan Izrailevich Vainshtein (Russian: Севьян Израилевич Вайнштейн; 1926–2008) was a Russian ethnographer, archaeologist, and historian of Siberian and Central Asian peoples. He was a professor at the Institute of Ethnology and Anthropology of the Russian Academy of Sciences in Moscow.

== Family ==
His father, Israel Vainshtein, had been a professor of philosophy at the Avia Institute in Moscow. In 1936, during Stalin's leadership of the Soviet Union, he was accused of spying for the Germans. After a two-year prison stay, he was shot to death, but was rehabilitated posthumously. Sevyan's mother was from Riga; after her marriage in Russia she became a teacher of the German language.

== First expedition ==
Sevyan Vainshtein had concluded his study of ethnology at the University of Moscow in 1950, while in 1947 he had been honored with a High University Award for his religious-philosophical work about the Ishmaelites.

During his studies, Vainshtein participated in an expedition in Siberia in 1948 to the river Podkamennaya Tunguska (Substone Tunguska), a 1,150 mile long tributary of the great Yenisei River, to visit and research the small Nordic Kets peoples' cultural roots as well as the circumstances of their life. He found that the Kets' culture was threatened with extinction. Consequently, he wrote a respective report to the Institute, stressing the Kets’ poor living conditions and suggesting federal aid.

This report was considered to discredit Russia's ethnic politics, and he was expelled from Comsomol (the Young Communist League) and from the institute. But Vainshtein, with his firmness to defending peoples’ rights, wrote a letter to Vyacheslav Molotov, and some time later it was decided to check the facts in Vainshtein's report by sending a new expedition to the Kets, which proved that his initial report was correct and that this people badly needed help, which was then provided. Vainshtein was admitted back to the institute and became a prominent student.

== Second expedition ==
Vainshtein also decided to undertake a second expedition in 1949, when he established that the Kets consisted of two tribes, whose northern branch were likely those whose ancestors had migrated across the land bridge of the then-dry Bering Strait into America some 12,000 years ago. The Kets’ southern tribe was said to have settled in southern Siberia near the headwaters of the Yenisei. Having obtained his university degree in 1950, he proposed researching the origins of the southern Kets, and after this was agreed upon in the same year, he had reached the territory of what today is Tuva, another region of Siberia which ethnologically and archaeologically represented an almost complete unknown area (terra incognita) on the Soviet Union's map.

== 1950s ==
In Tuva's capital city Kyzyl, Vainshtein worked as scientific director at the State Museum from 1950 to 1954. Following that period he was asked to work in the same capacity at the Tuvan Institute for History, Language and Literature.

During this time he also met the Russian music pedagogue Alevtina (Alla) Petrova, who was teaching in Tuva the Russian classical music heritage, and the two got married in Kyzyl.

Within this almost 10-year period, Vainshtein undertook wide-ranging ethnographic and archaeologic research in many parts of Tuva. Among these scientific endeavors, he visited and interviewed thousands of Tuvans and explored hundreds of important archaeological monuments, including Kurgans of the ancient Scythian culture, all of which he thoroughly researched and described in Russian and international scientific publications. In order to materialize his field research, he undertook many trips on inhospitable expedition trails over thousands of kilometers on horse back, on the backs of reindeer and camels, and on foot, because Tuva had only very few consolidated roads at the time, especially in the eastern Sayan Mountains.

Late in 1959, Vainshtein and his family returned to Moscow. At the Institute of Ethnology and Anthropology of the RAS, he began to undertake further intensive research into the large ancient Asian migrations, and about the Tuvans and their evolution in particular, bolstering this up with regular field research in Tuva and elsewhere in Central Asia.

== 1960s ==
In 1961 Vainshtein took a degree in history as Dr. Sc. with his thesis about the origins and culture of the Tuvan people, and was later appointed professor at his Institute.

At an Anthropology Congress in Moscow in 1964, Sevyan Vainshtein was approached by another participant, the world-renowned explorer Thor Heyerdahl of Norway, who had asked him for a separate discussion, requesting Vainshtein to tell him more about his expeditions and to let him read his diaries. The two had a long conversation, during which Heyerdahl also reflected about his own expeditions and research.

A few days later, he visited Vainshtein again, returning his diaries and strongly encouraging him to someday write a book about his personal experiences, including intriguing details from his expeditions into Central Asia. The book would be aimed not only at the scientific community but also at the general public interested in foreign peoples and cultures. In saying goodbye, Heyerdahl remarked to him with emphasis: “Don’t postpone the work on such a book for too long. There will be many interested readers the world over. Believe my own experience!”

== 1980's and 1990's ==
He undertook his last major journey to Tuva in 1983. In nearly 25 years of research, Vainshtein expanded his scientific studies towards the Tofalars, the Altai people, the Buryats and the Mongolians. Further research and study trips followed into the 1990's.

== Documentary ==
In the late 1990's, the Russian filmmaker Leonid Kruglov visited Vainshtein proposing to produce a film about his expeditions into Tuva, using as a "red line" Vainshtein's correspondence with American Nobel laureate Richard Feynman, who had written him a letter in 1981 requesting his help in securing a visa to visit Tuva, which had not been granted during Feynman's lifetime.

In June 2009, Feynman's daughter Michelle did visit Tuva accompanied by a BBC reporter.

To make the documentary, Kruglov and his film crew travelled on the backs of horses and reindeer to reach the places in Tuva which Vainshtein had visited and researched.

During the many months of filming, Kruglov also managed to reach a mysterious location high up in the taiga of the eastern Sayan Mountains, which Vainshtein had once tried but failed to visit: the Arshan-Tschoigan mineral springs, reputed to have healing powers.

In 2000 Vainshtein was awarded the title "Honourable Scientist of Russia" by the Russian president, Vladimir Putin. Previously in 1977 he was honored by the parliament of Tuva with the award "Scientist of Honour of the Republic of Tuva." The Russian State Museum for Oriental Art has recently named Vainshtein's monographs a "golden discovery" for the Russian ethnology, especially his aforementioned book The History of Folk Art in Tuva, a work that is not only important for Tuvan science but also for the history of art of many other peoples of Central Asia and South Siberia.

== Publications ==
Vainshtein wrote more than 300 scientific publications, including numerous monographs, of which his main works are:

- The Todsha-Tuvans – Historic-Ethnographical Studies, Moscow 1961
- The Historic Ethnography of Tuvans – Problems of a Nomadic Economy, Moscow 1972
- The History of Folk Art in Tuva, Moscow 1974
- Nomads of South Siberia, Moscow 1980, and Cambridge 1980 and 2009
- The World of Nomads in the Center of Asia, Moscow 1991 and Berlin 1996

In his 1971 publication entitled "The Problem of the Origins of Reindeer Herding in Eurasia, Part II: The Role of the Sayan Center in the Diffusion of Reindeer Herding in Eurasia," Vainshtein argued that that Sayan reindeer herding "is the oldest form of reindeer herding and is associated with the earliest domestication of the reindeer by the Samoyedic taiga population of the Sayan Mountains at the turn of the first millennium A.D...The Sayan region was apparently the origin of the economic and cultural complex of reindeer hunters-herdsmen that we now see among the various Evenki groups and the peoples of the Sayan area." The Sayan ethnic groups still live almost exclusively in the area of the Eastern Sayan mountains.

A total of 30 works, including two monographs, have been translated into English and German as well as into numerous other European languages. The author was invited to hold scientific lectures about Siberian peoples, especially about Tuvans and their tradition of shamanism, at the Universities of Moscow, Novosibirsk and Cambridge, but also at educational institutions in Germany, Finland, France, Sweden, Japan and the USA.

Vainshtein's last book is the one that Thor Heyderdahl had urged him to write – a popular-scientific book with his personal experiences and details of the almost 50 years of exploratory travels and research in Central Asia, especially in Tuva, which one can also classify as an autobiographical account of his incredibly difficult expeditions on unknown paths into hitherto uncharted lands. Under the close guidance of Sevyan Vainshtein, this book was first published in German, with the title Geheimnisvolles Tuwa – Expeditionen in das Herz Asiens, Oststeinbek 2005/2006, along with a DVD featuring Leonid Kruglov's aforementioned documentary as well as many of his photos, and examples of the famous Tuvan throat singing.

The book's Russian version, again under the close guidance of the author, was finally produced with the personal help and support of the Tuvan representative of the State Duma, deputy Larisa Shoigu and some of her friends: it was published in Moscow in January 2009, shortly before the author's unexpected death in October 2008.

When this book was presented by Larisa Shoigu in the conference hall of the Aldan Maadyr Tuvan National Museum in June 2009, where Vainshtein had once been the scientific director, officials pleaded to undertake the necessary steps to publish all of Sevyan Vainshtein's books as a multi-volume edition of collected works.

== See also ==
- Reindeer in Russia
