= Khroma Bay =

Bay in the East Siberian Sea

- Хромская губа
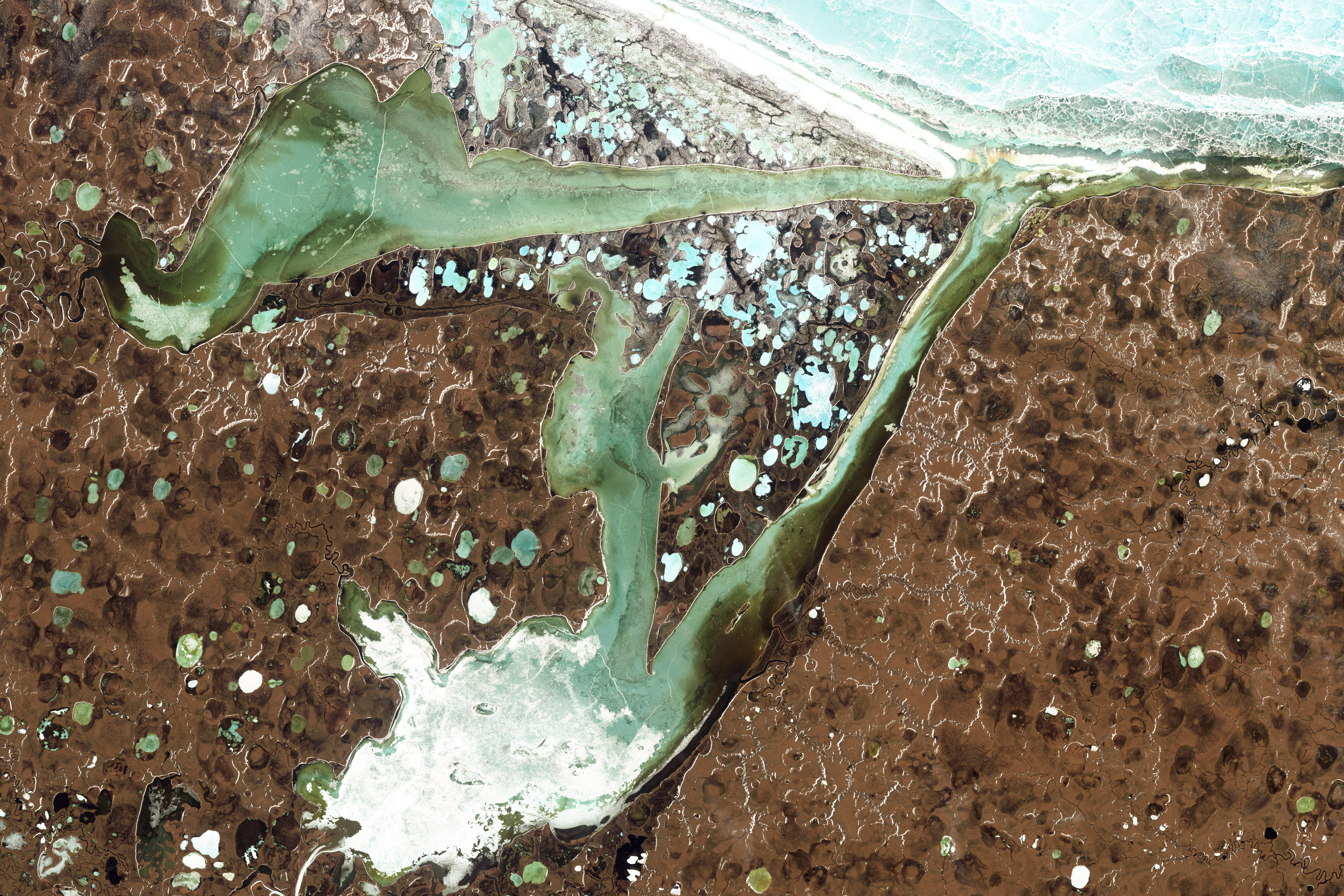
- Satellite image of the Omulyakh (above) and Khroma bays

- Map showing the location of the bay

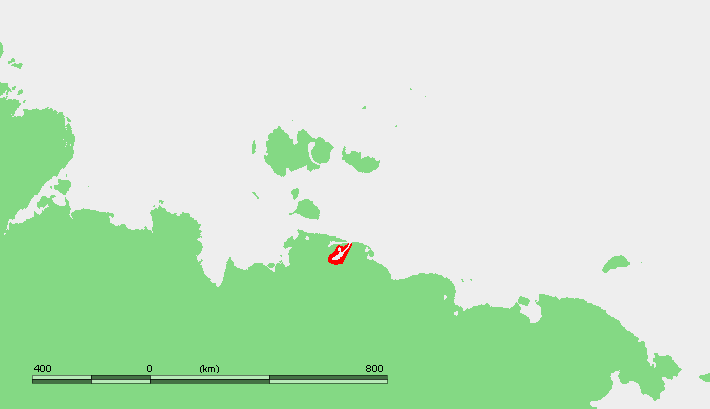
- Location: Far North
- Coordinates: 71.8833°N 145.8833°E
- Ocean/sea sources: East Siberian Sea
- Basin countries: Russia
- Max. length: 130 km (81 mi)
- Max. width: 30 km (19 mi)

The Khroma Bay (Russian: Хромская губа, Khromskaya Guba) is a bay in the East Siberian Sea, part of the Sakha Republic (Yakutia) administrative division of the Russian Federation.

Owing to is northerly location the bay is covered with ice most of the year.

== Geography ==
The bay lies west of the Sundrun River region and east of the Yana Bay. It is open to the northeast through a narrow and straight channel and is 130 km (81 mi) in length. Its maximum width is about 30 km (19 mi) and it has a branch or inlet extending northwards midway between its mouth and its most inland shore point. The Omullyakh Bay lies north of the bay and shares the same mouth.

This bay is in the shores of the East Siberian Lowland, an area of wetlands; lakes and marshes dot the whole landscape. The 685 km (426 mi) long Khroma and the 204 km (127 mi) long Lapcha flow into the head of the bay from the south.

== Fauna ==
Mammoths were common in this region during the holocene period. In the summer the bay is a breeding and molting area for the lesser white-fronted goose.
