= Sundrun =

- Location in Sakha, Russia
- Native name: Сундрун (Russian)

Location
- Country: Russia
- Location: Sakha

Physical characteristics
- Source
  - location: Unnamed lake
  - coordinates: 69°51′50″N 151°28′39″E
  - elevation: 165 m (541 ft)
- Mouth
  - location: East Siberian Sea
  - coordinates: 70.8123°N 152.5582°E
  - elevation: 0 m (0 ft)
- Length: 314 km (195 mi)
- Basin size: 4,170 km^{2} (1,610 sq mi)

The Sundrun (Russian: Сундрун) is a river in the Sakha Republic (Yakutia) of the Russian Federation. It is 314 kilometres (195 mi) long, and has a drainage basin of 4,170 square kilometres (1,610 sq mi).

== Course ==
It has its sources in the Ulakhan-Sis Range and flows roughly northeastwards across the Kondakov Plateau. Leaving the uplands, it crosses the Yana-Indigirka Lowland tundra, part of the greater East Siberian Lowland. It flows first in a roughly eastern and then, more than halfway through its course, in a northern direction. Its mouth is in the East Siberian Sea at the western end of the Kolyma Bay. The Sundrun River freezes up in early October and remains icebound until June.

=== Tributaries ===
The main tributary of the Sundrun is the 235 km (146 mi) long Maly Khomus-Yuryakh (Малый Хомус-Юрях) from the right.

== Khroma-Sundrun Interfluvial Area ==
The Kytalyk Wetlands, located between the Sundrun and the Khroma, are an ecologically important area, providing a favorable habitat for many rare animals. It is practically uninhabited and full of lakes and marshes. Siberian cranes are abundant in the Sundrun River wetlands.

The lesser white-fronted goose, Brent goose, Bewick's swan and the spectacled eider are also found in the Khroma-Sundrun Interfluvial Area.

There is also a wild reindeer population in the Sundrun basin.

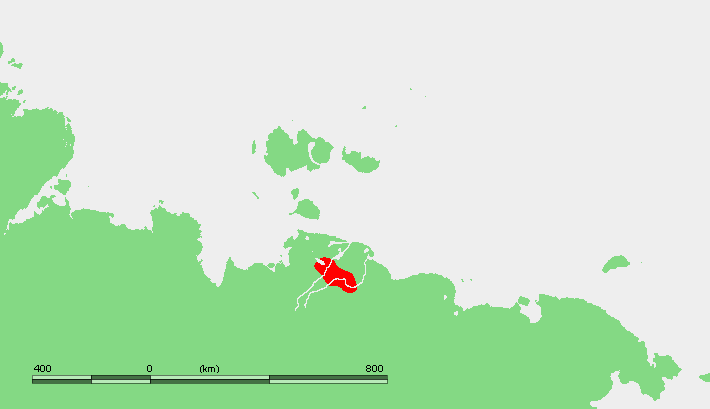
Location of the Khroma-Sundrun Interfluvial Area; the Sundrun River is on the right.

== Sundrun Kekurs ==
The "Sundrun Kekurs" (Сундрунские кекуры) are the natural kigilyakh-type rock formations of the Ulakhan-Sis Range and Suor Uyata, located in the upper course of the river.

== See also ==
- List of rivers of Russia
