= Okinsky District =

Okinsky District Окинский район (Russian)
- District

Other transcription(s)
  - Buryat: Ахын аймаг
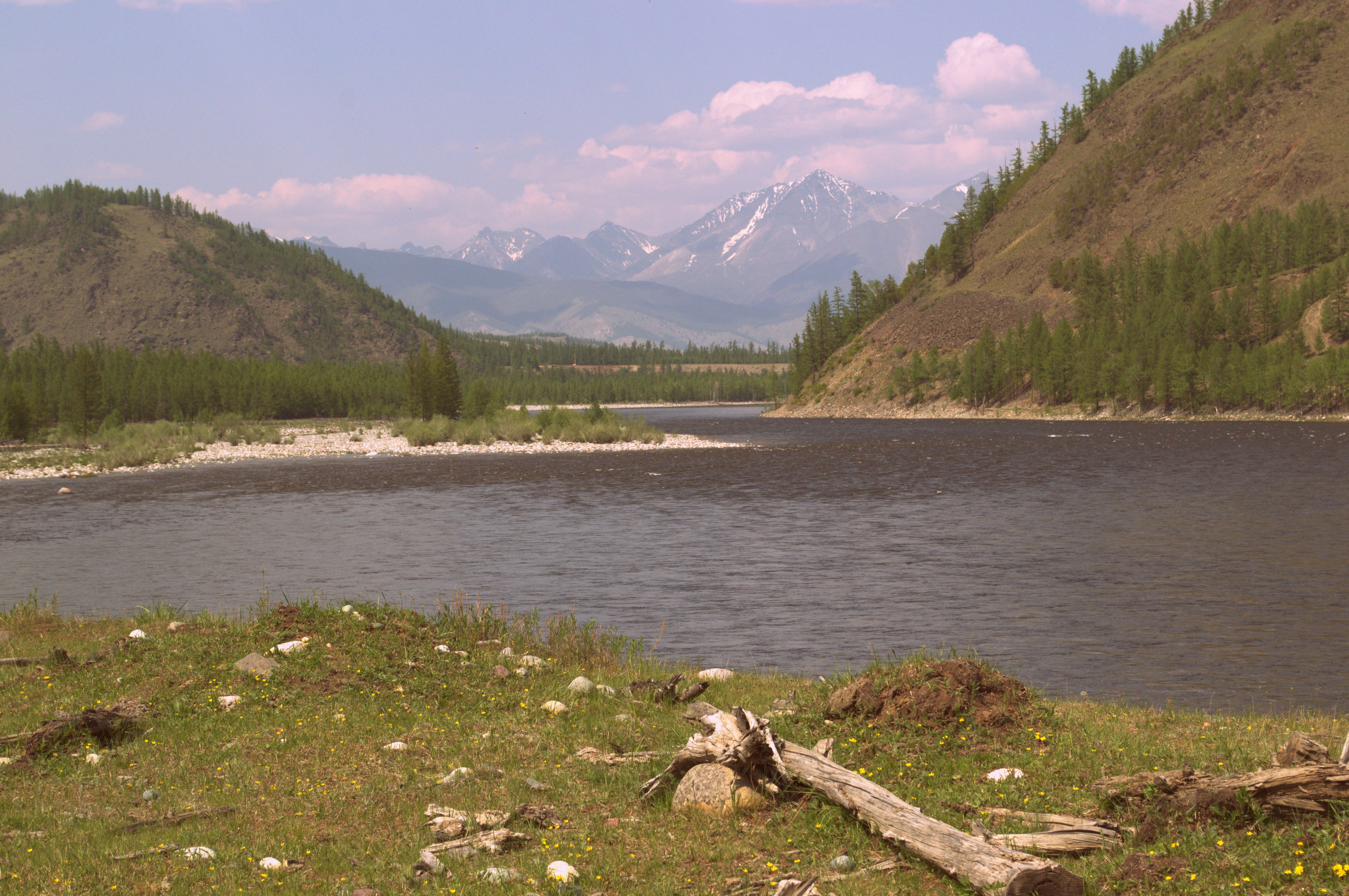
- Landscape near the selo of Orlik in Okinsky District

- Flag Coat of arms
- Location of Okinsky District in the Republic of Buryatia
- Coordinates: 52°31′N 99°49′E
- Country: Russia
- Federal subject: Republic of Buryatia
- Established: May 26, 1940
- Administrative center: Orlik

Area
  - Total: 26,012 km^{2} (10,043 sq mi)

Population (2010 Census)
  - Total: 5,353
  - Density: 0.2058/km^{2} (0.5330/sq mi)
  - Urban: 0%
  - Rural: 100%

Administrative structure
  - Administrative divisions: 1 Selsoviets, 3 Somons
  - Inhabited localities: 15 rural localities

Municipal structure
  - Municipally incorporated as: Okinsky Municipal District
  - Municipal divisions: 0 urban settlements, 4 rural settlements
- Time zone: UTC+8 (MSK+5)
- OKTMO ID: 81639000
- Website: http://okarb.ru/

Population of Okinsky District
- 2010 Census: 5,353
- 2002 Census: 4,591
- 1989 Census: 4,479
- 1979 Census: 3,687

Okinsky District (Russian: Оки́нский райо́н; Buryat: Ахын аймаг, Akhyn aimag) is an administrative and municipal district (raion), one of the twenty-one in the Republic of Buryatia, Russia. It is located in the west of the republic. The area of the district is 26,012 square kilometers (10,043 sq mi). Its administrative center is the rural locality (a selo) of Orlik. As of the 2010 Census, the total population of the district was 5,353, with the population of Orlik accounting for 47.7% of that number.

== History ==
The district was established on May 26, 1940.

== Administrative and municipal status ==
Within the framework of administrative divisions, Okinsky District is one of the twenty-one in the Republic of Buryatia. The district is divided into one selsoviet and three somons, which comprise fifteen rural localities. As a municipal division, the district is incorporated as Okinsky Municipal District. Its one selsoviet and three somons are incorporated as four rural settlements within the municipal district. The selo of Orlik serves as the administrative center of both the administrative and municipal district.
