= Orlik, Republic of Buryatia =

Rural locality in Buryatia, Russia

Orlik Орлик
- Selo

Other transcription(s)
  - Buryat: Орлиг
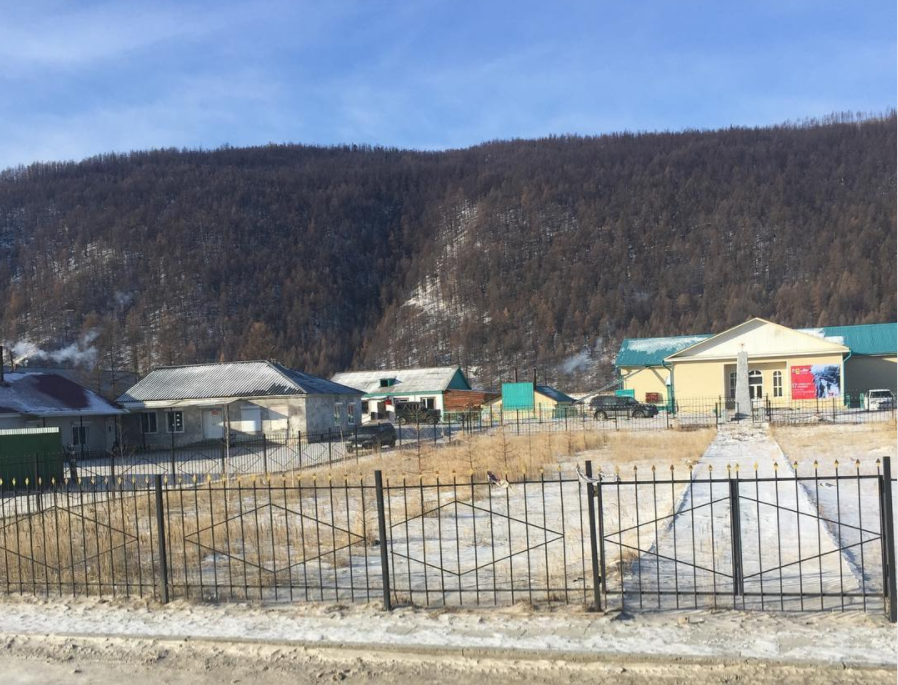

- Coat of arms
- Interactive map of Orlik
- Location of Orlik Orlik (Republic of Buryatia)
- Coordinates: 52°30′48″N 99°49′28″E
- Country: Russia
- Federal subject: Buryatia
- Administrative district: Okinsky District
- SelsovietSelsoviet: Orliksky
- Founded: 1927
- Elevation: 1,376 m (4,514 ft)

Population (2010 Census)
  - Total: 2,555
  - Estimate (2010): 2,555 (0%)

Administrative status
  - Capital of: Okinsky District, Orliksky Selsoviet

Municipal status
  - Municipal district: Okinsky Municipal District
  - Rural settlement: Orlikskoye Rural Settlement
  - Capital of: Okinsky Municipal District, Orlikskoye Rural Settlement
- Time zone: UTC+8 (MSK+5)
- Postal code: 671030
- OKTMO ID: 81639422101

Orlik (Russian: О́рлик, Buryat: Орлиг, Orlig; Mongolian: Өрлөг, Örlög) is a rural locality (a selo) and the administrative center of Okinsky District of the Republic of Buryatia, Russia. Population: 2,555 (2010 census); 2,045 (2002 census); 1,792 (1989 Soviet census).

== Climate ==
Climate data for Orlik (extremes 1934-present)
Month	Jan	Feb	Mar	Apr	May	Jun	Jul	Aug	Sep	Oct	Nov	Dec	Year
Record high °C (°F)	0.3 (32.5)	6.9 (44.4)	16.7 (62.1)	24.2 (75.6)	29.1 (84.4)	32.4 (90.3)	35.8 (96.4)	33.5 (92.3)	29.2 (84.6)	19.5 (67.1)	10.2 (50.4)	4.8 (40.6)	35.8 (96.4)
Mean daily maximum °C (°F)	−17.7 (0.1)	−10.2 (13.6)	−1.4 (29.5)	6.5 (43.7)	14.1 (57.4)	20.8 (69.4)	22.8 (73.0)	20.2 (68.4)	13.2 (55.8)	4.1 (39.4)	−7.3 (18.9)	−15.8 (3.6)	4.1 (39.4)
Daily mean °C (°F)	−24.5 (−12.1)	−19.5 (−3.1)	−10.7 (12.7)	−1.4 (29.5)	5.6 (42.1)	11.9 (53.4)	14.3 (57.7)	11.6 (52.9)	4.7 (40.5)	−3.6 (25.5)	−14.0 (6.8)	−21.7 (−7.1)	−3.9 (24.9)
Mean daily minimum °C (°F)	−29.0 (−20.2)	−25.7 (−14.3)	−18.5 (−1.3)	−8.3 (17.1)	−1.7 (28.9)	4.3 (39.7)	7.8 (46.0)	5.3 (41.5)	−1.6 (29.1)	−9.5 (14.9)	−18.8 (−1.8)	−25.9 (−14.6)	−10.1 (13.8)
Record low °C (°F)	−46.9 (−52.4)	−46.6 (−51.9)	−40.8 (−41.4)	−31.9 (−25.4)	−18.2 (−0.8)	−9.0 (15.8)	−5.0 (23.0)	−6.8 (19.8)	−23.0 (−9.4)	−31.6 (−24.9)	−39.8 (−39.6)	−47.3 (−53.1)	−47.3 (−53.1)
Average precipitation mm (inches)	2.5 (0.10)	2.1 (0.08)	4.6 (0.18)	10.0 (0.39)	25.6 (1.01)	70.2 (2.76)	92.1 (3.63)	74.2 (2.92)	32.9 (1.30)	8.6 (0.34)	3.9 (0.15)	7.8 (0.31)	334.5 (13.17)
Source: pogoda.ru.net
