= Soyot language =

Siberian Turkic language

Soyot
- сойыт тыл soyıt tıl
- Native to: Russia, Mongolia
- Region: Buryatia, Khövsgöl Province
- Ethnicity: Soyots
- Extinct: late 20th century
- Revival: 2000s
- Language family: Turkic: Common Turkic; Siberian Turkic; South Siberian; Sayan Turkic; Taiga Sayan Turkic; Soyot

Language codes
- ISO 639-3: None (mis)
- Glottolog: soyo1234 Soyot
- ELP: Soyot
- Soyot is classified as Extinct by the UNESCO Atlas of the World's Languages in Danger

Soyot (or Soyot–Tsaatan) is an extinct and revitalizing Turkic language of the Siberian Sayan branch similar to the Dukhan language and closely related to the Tofa language. Two dialects/languages are spoken in Russia and Mongolia: Soyot in the Okinsky District of the Republic of Buryatia (Russia) and Tsaatan (Uriankhai Uyghur) in the Darkhad valley of Mongolia.

The language is revitalizing in primary schools. In 2002, V. I. Rassadin published a Soyot–Buryat–Russian dictionary. In 2020, he published a children's picture dictionary in the Soyot language, along with Russian, Mongolian, and English translations.

== Classification ==
Soyot belongs to the Turkic family of languages. Within this family, it is placed in the Sayan Turkic branch. According to some researchers, the Sayan Turkic branch has five languages:

- Sayan Turkic
  - Tuvan (ISO 639:tyv)
  - Tofa (ISO 639:kim)
  - Soyot
  - Dukhan (~~ISO 639:dkh~~, rejected)
  - Tuba (extinct, not to be confused with the Tubalar dialect of Northern Altai language)

According to Glottolog, Soyot is a dialect of the Taiga Sayan Turkic language:

- Sayan
  - Taiga Sayan Turkic
    - Dukha
    - Soyot
    - Todja
    - Tofa
    - Tuha
  - Tuvinian

Ragagnin similarly divides the Sayan languages into two branches: Steppe and Taiga, but makes certain distinctions not made by Glottlog:

- Sayan Turkic
  - Taiga Sayan Turkic
    - Dukha
    - Tofa
    - Toju
    - Tuvan dialects of Tere-Khöl
    - Soyot
  - Steppe Sayan Turkic
    - Standard Tuvan
    - Altay-Sayan varieties of China and Mongolia
    - Tuha

== Geographic distribution ==
Soyot has no official recognition in any of the countries where it is spoken. Until 1993, they were counted as part of the Buryat nationality in Russia. At this point, they were acknowledged as a separate nationality by the People's Khural of the Republic of Buryatia. After applying to the Russian Duma for official recognition, they were acknowledged as an ethnic minority in 2001. Most Soyots in Russia live in Buryatia's Okinsky District.

== Phonology ==
Rassadin reports that the Soyot and Tsaatan dialects, have very similar phonological systems. Information here is from Soyot.

=== Consonants ===
Consonant phonemes of Soyot
		Labial	Dental/ Alveolar	Post- alveolar	Palatal	Velar	Uvular	Glottal
Nasal		m	n			ŋ		
Plosive or Affricate	voiceless	p	t	tʃ		k	q	
Plosive or Affricate	voiced	b	d	dʒ		ɡ		
Affricate			ts					
Fricative	voiceless	f	s	ʃ		x		h
Fricative	voiced	v	z	ʒ		ɣ		
Approximant				l	j			
Trill or Tap				r				

=== Vowels ===
Vowels of Soyot
	Front		Back	
	unrounded	rounded	unrounded	rounded
Close	i	y	ɯ	u
Mid	e	ø		o
Open	æ		a	

Vowels may be short, long, or short pharyngealized, e.g. ıt/ɯt/ "send", ît /ɯˁt/ "dog", /ɯːt/ "sound, voice".

Soyot exhibits vowel harmony, that is, words containing front vowels take only suffixes containing front vowels, whereas words with back vowels take only suffixes with back vowels.

== Writing system ==
Soyot is not commonly written. Rassadin employs a Cyrillic-based writing system to represent Soyot in his dictionaries and grammars. Certain letters are only found in Russian loanwords.

Soyot alphabet
Letter	Value	Letter	Value	Letter	Value
Аа	/a/	Ққ	/q/	Хх	/x/
Бб	/b/	Лл	/l/	Һһ	/h/
Вв	/v/	Мм	/m/	Цц	/t͡s/
Гг	/g/	Нн	/n/	Чч	/t͡ʃ/
Ғғ	/ɣ/	Ңң	/ŋ/	Ҷҷ (Note: Khakassian Che (Ӌ) can also be used as a substitute letter)	/d͡ʒ/
Дд	/d/	Оо	/o/	Шш	/ʃ/
Ее	/e, ʲe/ (Note: Not used at the beginning of words.)	Өө	/ø/	Щщ	/ɕ/
Ёё	/ʲo, jo/	Пп	/p/	Ъъ	/◌ˤ/ (Note: Indicates that the preceding vowel is pharyngealized.)
Жж	/ʒ/	Рр	/r/	Ыы	/ɯ/
Зз	/z/	Сс	/s/	Ьь	/◌ʲ/ (Note: Indicates that the preceding consonant is palatalized.)
Ии	/i/ (Note: Ии and Іі both represent the same sound /i/. Ии indicates that the previous consonant is palatalized; Іі indicates that it is not.)	Тт	/t/	Ээ	/e/ (Note: Used at the beginning of words or after vowels.)
Іі	/i/	Уу	/u/	Әә	/æ/
Йй	/j/	Үү	/y/	Юю	/ʲu, ju/
Кк	/k/	Фф	/f/	Яя	/ʲa, ja/

== Grammar ==
=== Nouns ===
Nouns have singular and plural forms. The plural is formed with the suffix /-LAr/, which has six possible surface variations depending on vowel harmony and the preceding sound.

Soyot plural forms
	Front vowel	Back vowel
Nasal consonant	-nər: hemnər "rivers"	-nar: oyınnar "games"
Voiceless consonant	-tər: eştər "friends"	-tar: bâştar "heads"
Vowel or voiced consonant	-lær: öğlər "houses"	-lar: barva-lar "saddle bags"

Possession is indicated by adding a suffix to the possessed noun, e.g. ava-m "my mother", ava-ŋ "your mother". The possessive suffixes vary based on vowel harmony and whether the word they are attached to ends in a vowel or a consonant:

Soyot possessive markers
	Singular	Plural
1st person	-(I)m	-(I)vIs
2nd person	-(I)ŋ	-(I)ŋAr
3rd person	-(s)I	-(s)I

Case is indicated by adding suffixes after the plural and possessive markers, if they are present. There are seven cases in Soyot . The nominative case is not marked. The six cases that are indicated by suffixes are shown below. These vary based on vowel harmony and the final sound of the word they are attached to.

Soyot case markers
Accusative	-nı, -ni, -tı, -ti
Genitive	-nıñ, -niñ, -tıñ, -tiñ
Dative	-ğa, -gə, -qa, -kə
Locative	-da, -də, -ta, -tə
Ablative	-dan, -dən, -tan, -tən
Directive	-ğıdı, -gidi, -qıdı, -kidi

=== Adjectives ===
Certain adjectives may be intensified via reduplication. The involves taking the first syllable plus /p/ and adding it to the front of the word, e.g. qap-qara "very black", sap-sarığ "very yellow". Other adjectives are intensified using the adverb tuñ "very", e.g. tuñ ulığ "very big".

=== Numerals ===
Soyot employs a base-10 counting system.

Soyot numerals
1	birə	10	on
2	Îxi	20	çérbi, çerb̧i
3	üş	30	ücön
4	dört	40	dörtön
5	beş	50	becön
6	âltı	60	âlton
7	çedi	70	Çed on
8	seğes	80	seğes on
9	toğos	90	toğos on
100	çüz	1000	mıñ

Complex numerals are created much as in English, e.g. üş mıñ, toğos mıñ, çüz toğos on toğos "three thousand nine hundred ninety-nine".

Ordinal numerals are formed by adding the word duğár to the cardinal numeral, e.g. İxxi duğár

== See also ==
- Dukhan language
