= Tofalar =

Tofalar Тоъфа
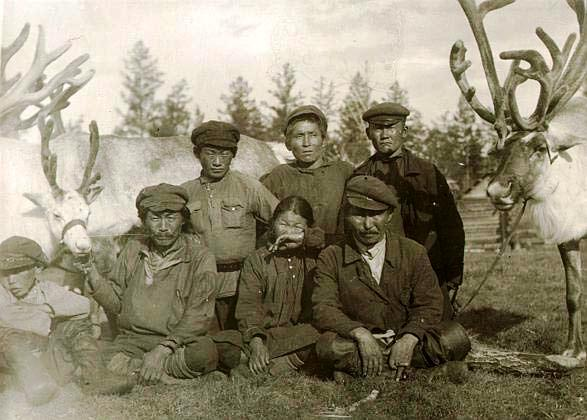

Total population
- 762 (2010)

Regions with significant populations
- Irkutsk Oblast (Siberia, Russia)
- Russia: Irkutsk Oblast: 719 (2021)
- Ukraine: 18 (2001)

Languages
- Tofalar, Russian

Religion
- Shamanism, Russian Orthodox Christianity, Animism

Related ethnic groups
- Tozhu Tuvans, Dukhans, Soyot

The Tofalar (also Karagas or Tofa; Тофалары, тофа (tofa) in Russian) people are a Turkic people who live in Tofalariya, in the southwestern part of Nizhneudinsky District, Irkutsk Oblast of Russia. The Tofalar population is highly mixed with Russians due to the presence of Russian settlers and high rates of intermarriage.

Prior to Soviet rule, the Tofalar led a nomadic lifestyle in the taiga, engaging in reindeer husbandry and hunting. Afterwards, they were resettled by the Soviet government and forced to adopt sedentarism and were discouraged from practicing hunting and shamanism. According to the 2010 census, there were 762 Tofalar in Russia.

== Etymology ==
Tofalar is an endonym and contains the Turkic plural suffix -lar, thus translating to "Tofas"; Tofalar means "people of the deer." The Tofalar were formerly known as 'Karagas,' which was derived from the name of one particular Tofalar clan, the Kara-Kash or Karahaash.

== History ==
=== Origins ===
The ancestors of the Tofalar (and the closely related Soyots, Tozhu Tuvans, and Dukha) were proto-Samoyedic hunters-gatherers who arrived in the eastern Sayan region by the end of the third millennium BCE and beginning of the second millennium BCE. During the Old Turkic period, the ancestors of the Tofalar underwent Turkification, adopting a Turkic language and abandoning the Mator language.

P. S. Pallas and J. G. Georgi initially regarded the Tofalar as a Samoyedic people, and that they had only adopted their Turkic language from the Tuvans in the 19th century. However, the Russian linguist Valentin Rassadin instead argued that the Tofolar were a Ket (Yeniseian)-speaking tribe who adopted a Turkic language in the 6th-8th centuries and adapted for their own phonological system; they would go on to take on other influences, including the Samoyeds, among others. The Tofalar culture is generally believed to be a combination of Ket (Yeniseian), Samoyedic, Turkic, and Mongol influences.

In the Middle Ages, they were subject to the Mongol khans and paid tribute to them; later, they were subjugated by the western Buryat princes. The Tofalar eventually moved from their homeland on the slopes of the Sayan Mountains up north to their current location during the 17th century. Historically, they have had extensive contact with the Tozhu Tuvans, sharing many similarities in culture and language.

=== Russian imperial expansion ===
In 1648, the Russians built the fortified settlement of Udinsk, bringing the Tofalar under Russian influence. The Tofalar were required to pay the yasaq, and every gunbearer had to pay a fixed number of sable furs, though this amount was often arbitrarily increased. As a result of this close contact, the Tofalar adopted many aspects of Russian culture, religion, and language. They were converted to Christianity early on but continued to adhere to shamanism.

Before the Soviet takeover, Tofalar mainly bartered with Russians, Buryats, and Mongol traders, acquiring saddles of Buryat and Mongol manufacture, hunting knives, axes, felt saddlecloths, harnesses, treated sheepskin, and diverse textiles and ornaments.

=== Soviet collectivization ===
The Soviets abolished the yasaq in 1926; in 1927, they enacted new hunting regulations and declared part of the former hunting grounds reservations., thus requiring Tofalar to get a permit to hunt in their native forests. Under new regulations, the moose the Tofalar used to eat now belonged to the state and were not allowed to be killed for food. The Soviets next enacted a campaign to force the Tofalar into adopting sedentarism and resettled them onto the sites of Alygdzher, Utkum, Nerkha and Gutara. By 1932, all of the Tofalar had been resettled and their reindeer and hunting grounds were collectivized.

In 1929, the first co-operative farms were formed, and from 1930 to 1931, the Tofalar were collectivized into three kolkhozes: Krasnyi Okhotnik, Kirov and Kyzyl-Tofa. In 1930, a Tofalar national district with Alygdzher as its centre, was formed in the Irkutsk region. Several Russian speaking schools founded in the 1930s, where Tofalar children were taught Russian, displacing the Tofa language.

In 1948, industrial gold mining was developed in Tofalaria; after its termination, the region became completely subsidized by the state.

=== Post Soviet collapse ===
The Tofalar today continue to fight for their rights to the land of their ancestors; of particular concern are non-native business men cutting down local cedar forests, the traditional hunting grounds of the Tofalar.

In 2017, the Nizhneudinsky District administration cancelled all benefits for air transport between Nizhneudinsk and Tofalaria settlements; previously, a helicopter ticket to Nizhneudinsk cost 750 rubles while beneficiaries flew for free. Afterwards, the government established a new fixed cost: it would cost 1500 rubles to fly to Alygdzher and Upper Gutara, and 1300 rubles to Nerkha. This decision was widely unpopular among the Tofalar, as they believed the small-numbered indigenous peoples should have the right to move freely on their territory.

== Language ==
The Tofa language belongs to a branch of Turkic languages and is very close to the language of Tozhu Tuvans and Soyots. There are two dialects of the Tofa language: Alygdzher and Gutar. There are hundreds of loanwords from medieval Mongolian and Russian, and dozens of loan words from Buryat. The Tofa language did not have a written form until 1989, when the linguist Valentin Rassadin created a writing system based on the Cyrillic alphabet; in the 1990s, Tofalar activists successfully campaigned for their local schools to teach the children in the Tofa language.

== Culture ==
=== Subsistence ===
The Tofalar were traditionally nomadic, and their economy centered around reindeer husbandry, trapping, and hunting. On average, one household kept anywhere from 20 to 30 reindeer, which they used for transportation, clothing, shelter, and food. Reindeer milk was used for drinking and making cheese and curdled milk. They lived in traditional conical tents (chum), which were made of animal hide in the winter and birch bark (polotnishch) in the summer. The Tofalar also hunt and eat deer, bear, waterfowl, and fish in autumn ponds during the spawning season; additionally, they hunted sables, ermine, Siberian polecats, and squirrels for their fur, using rifles and accompanied by dogs. Alongside the curing of meat and the drying of reindeer milk for winter provisions, the Tofalar supplemented their diet with dried tubers (saran), wild onions, and pine and cedar nuts. Historically, products such as flour, groats, salt, sugar, tea, tobacco, and alcohol were purchased from traders in exchange for furs.

During the Soviet era, most Tofalar made their living working on state farms, even after the collapse of the Soviet Union. The Tofalar today are sedentary and primarily live in modern timber houses but still use traditional tents as storage. Hunting and fishing are the primary economic activities, and deer continue to be used as a means of transport. Men leave their villages during winter to go hunting in the cedar forests.

=== Entertainment ===
Additionally, the Tofalar practice wrestling, archery, and horse racing. Traditional Tofalar music instruments include the chadygan, a stringed instrument like the gusli, and the charty-hobus, which is similar to balalaika; music was played to accompany songs and dances at festivals.

=== Traditional medicine ===
The Tofalar mostly used folk medicine, but sometimes sought out healing from Buryat healers.

=== Death ===
The Tofalar believed that the dead would go live in the Kingdom of Erlik following their death; the deceased were buried with their personal belongings under the belief that they would need them in the next life. Notably, they believed that in Erlik, everything was the 'wrong way around,' so the objects accompanying the dead had to be damaged. The Tofalar death ritual has been greatly influenced by Christianity, and the Tofalar, like Russian Christians, mark the ninth day, fortieth day, sixth month, and first year after the death of a relative.

== Society ==
Prior to Soviet collectivization, the Tofalar were organized into five patrilineal clans (nyon), though there used to be seven. Each clan consisted of a group of closely related families descended from one ancestor (aal), led by an elder called the ulug-bash, and had its own territory (aimak) and migration routes. Tofalar territory used to be divided into three parts-

1. Burungu aallar: The eastern group of nomadic camps (aallar), which included the territory of the Chogdu, Akchugdu, and Kara-Chogdu clans on the Yda, Kara-Burn, Ytkum, and Iya rivers.
2. Ortaa aallar: The middle group of nomadic camps, which included the territory of the Cheptai clan on the Little Birius, Nerkha, Erma, and Iaga rivers.
3. Songy aallar: The western group of nomadic camps, which included the territory of the Kara-Kash and Saryt-Haash clans on the Agul, Tagul, Gutara, Big Birius, and Iuglym rivers.

Marriage was exogamous, and was concluded after a preliminary courtship, an agreement between the parents, and the payment of bride-price to the father of the bride. The wedding typically lasted three days, and was accompanied by a feast where special rituals, songs, and dances were performed. Following the wedding, the new groom took his wife to his nomad camp, separate from his family's, where they set up their own tent and began to live as an independent family unit. If the bride had premarital children, they remained with her father and were considered his children. Mixed Russian-Tofalar marriages are common today.

Men were charged with hunting, fishing, pasturing reindeer, and creating various tools and objects from wood. Women ran the household, cared for children, prepared food, and preserved and stored food; it was also women who charted out the nomadic routes of the household, gathering the reindeer and taking down the tents before reassembling the camp upon moving.

Customarily, it was the youngest son who remained in the paternal tent and inherited the familial home. On the death of her husband, the widow inherited all the property of her deceased husband.

== Religion ==
The conversion of the Tofalar to Christianity was largely in name only; there were shamans among the Tofalar until their 1930 suppression by the Soviet state.

== See also ==
- Alygdzher
