= Dukhan language =

Northeastern Turkic language

Dukha
- Tsaatan, Tuha
- тyъһа тыл Tuha tıl tuʰha sös
- Native to: Mongolia
- Region: Khövsgöl Province
- Ethnicity: Dukha
- Native speakers: 40 (2022)
- Language family: Turkic: Common Turkic; Siberian Turkic; South Siberian; Sayan Turkic; Taiga Sayan Turkic; Dukha

Language codes
- ISO 639-3: dkh (rejected)
- Glottolog: dukh1234
- ELP: Dukha
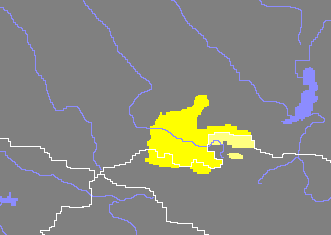
- Dukhan and Tuvan distribution in Mongolia and Tuva

- Dukha is classified as Severely Endangered by the UNESCO Atlas of the World's Languages in Danger

Dukhan or Dukha is a nearly extinct Turkic language or dialect variety of the Tuvan language spoken by the Dukhan (also known as Tsaatan) herder people in the Tsagaan-Nuur county of Khövsgöl Province in northern Mongolia. Dukhan belongs to the Taiga subgroup of Sayan Turkic (which also includes Soyot–Tsaatan and Tofa). This language is nearly extinct and is only spoken actively by no more than 40 people. The ISO 639-3 proposal (request) code was dkh, but this proposal was rejected.

It is mostly related to the Soyot language of Buryatia. Also, it is related to the language of Tozhu Tuvans and the Tofa language. Today, it is spoken alongside Mongolian.

Dukhan morphophonemic units are written with capital letters, similar to its sister languages and standard grammars.

== Classification ==
Dukhan is classified in the Taiga Sayan Turkic branch of Siberian Turkic. The Dukhan language is mainly related to an amalgam of dialects from the nomadic people of Outer Mongolia, Russia, and surrounding areas. It is most closely related to Tuvan.

== Geographical distribution ==
The Dukha language is spoken in Tsagaan-Nuur County, Tsagaanuur (Khövsgöl) Mongolia. Цагааннуур сум) is a Sum (district) of Mongolia in the province of Khövsgöl, located in Northern Mongolia.
