= Che with hook =

Cyrillic letter

- Ч̡ ч̡

Usage
- Writing system: Cyrillic
- Type: Alphabetic
- Language of origin: Tofa language, Surgut Khanty
- Sound values: /t͡ʃ/ /d͡ʒ/

History
- Development: Ч ч: Ч̡ ч̡

Che with hook (sometimes Ч̡ ч̡, italics: Ч̡ ч̡) is an allograph of the letter che with descender (Ҷ, ҷ) in the Cyrillic script. It represents a voiced or voiceless postalveolar affricate.

== Usage ==
It has been used for the Surgut dialect of Eastern Khanty and the Tofa language.

== Forms and variants ==
Form used in certain publications in Surgut Khanty or Tofalar; especially in the fonts PT Sans or PT Serif.

Form also sometimes used in publications in Tofalar, especially Rassadin 2005.

== Computing codes ==
This letter has not been encoded in Unicode.

== Sources ==
- Рассадин, В. И. (2005). Словарь тофаларско-русский и русско-тофаларский (in Russian). Санкт-Петербург: Дрофа. ISBN 5-94745-111-5.
- Волкова, А. Н.; Соловар, В. Н. (2016). Краткий русско-хантыйский словарь (сургутский диалект) (PDF) (in Russian and Khanty). Ханты-Мансийск: Югорский формат. ISBN 978-5-9907703-2-4. VolkovaSolovar2016.
- Волкова, А. Н.; Соловар, В. Н. (2018). Хантыйско-русский тематический словарь (сургутский диалект) (PDF) (in Russian and Khanty). Санкт-Петербург: Издательство РГПУ им. А. И. Герцена. ISBN 978-5-8064-2560-8. VolkovaSolovar2018.

== Related letters and other similar characters ==
- Ч ч : Cyrillic letter Che
- У у : Cyrillic letter U
- Y y : Latin letter Y
