= Alygdzher =

Alygdzher Алыгджер
- Village
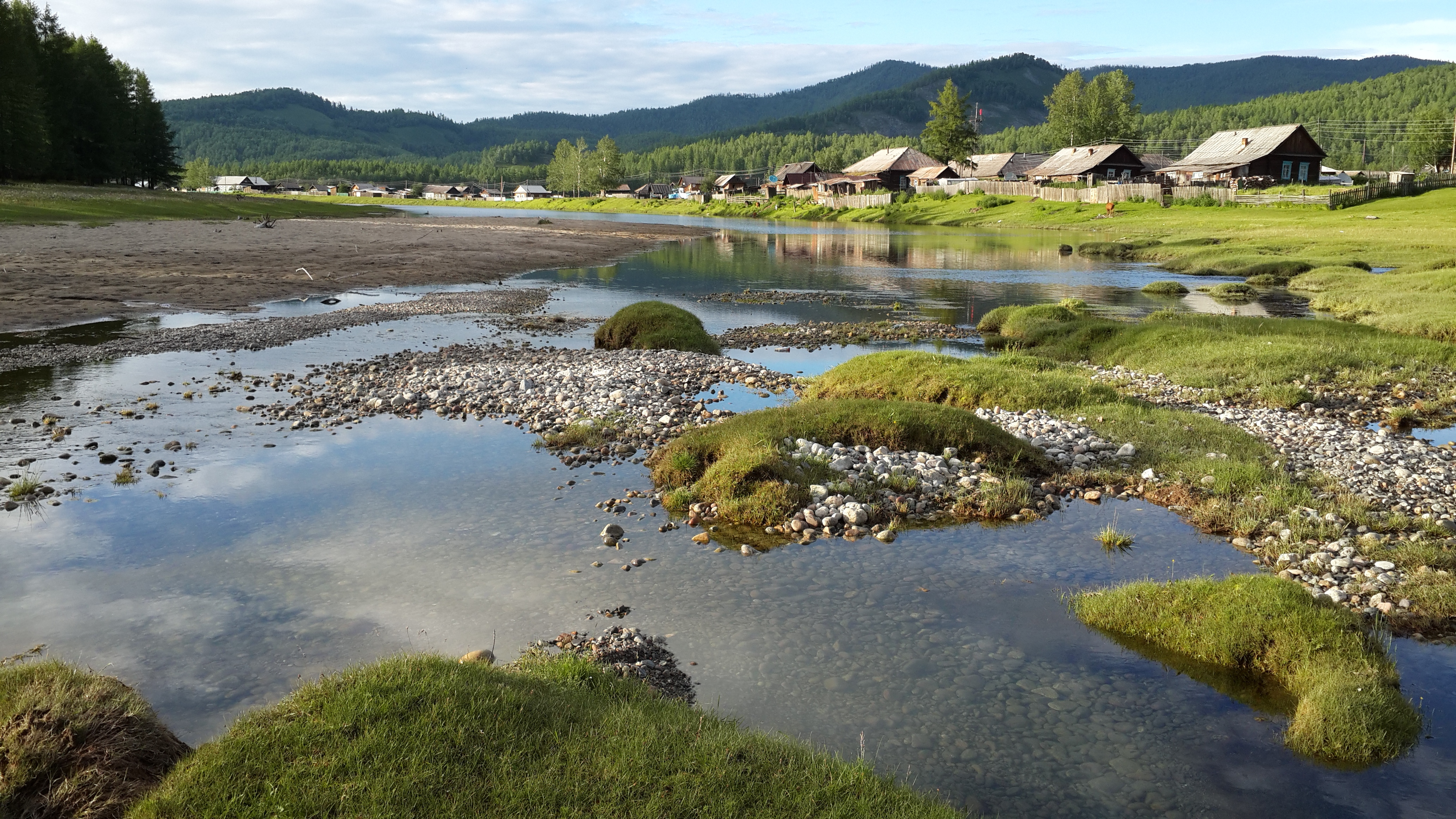
- View of the village

- Location within Irkutsk Oblast Location within Russia
- Coordinates: 53°38′N 98°13′E
- Country: Russia
- Region: Irkutsk Oblast
- District: Nizhneudinsky District
- Elevation: 916 m (3,005 ft)
- Time zone: UTC+8:00

Alygdzher (Russian: Алыгджер, Tofalar: Аълһыг-Ӌер) is a village (selo) in Nizhneudinsky District, Irkutsk Oblast, Russia. It is the administrative center of the Tofalar Municipality in Tofalariya. The population was 508 in 2010 and 526 as of 2017.

== Etymology ==
Alygdzher means 'wind' in the Tofa language.

== History ==
Alygdzher is the main population center of the Tofalar people group. In 2002, 248 Tofalars lived in it. From 1939-1950, the village was the head settlement of the Tofalar National Region.

== See also ==
- List of rural localities in Irkutsk Oblast
