= Tofalaria =

Region of the Russian Far East

Tofalaria Russian: Тофалария Tofalar: Тофалар чурту
- Cultural region
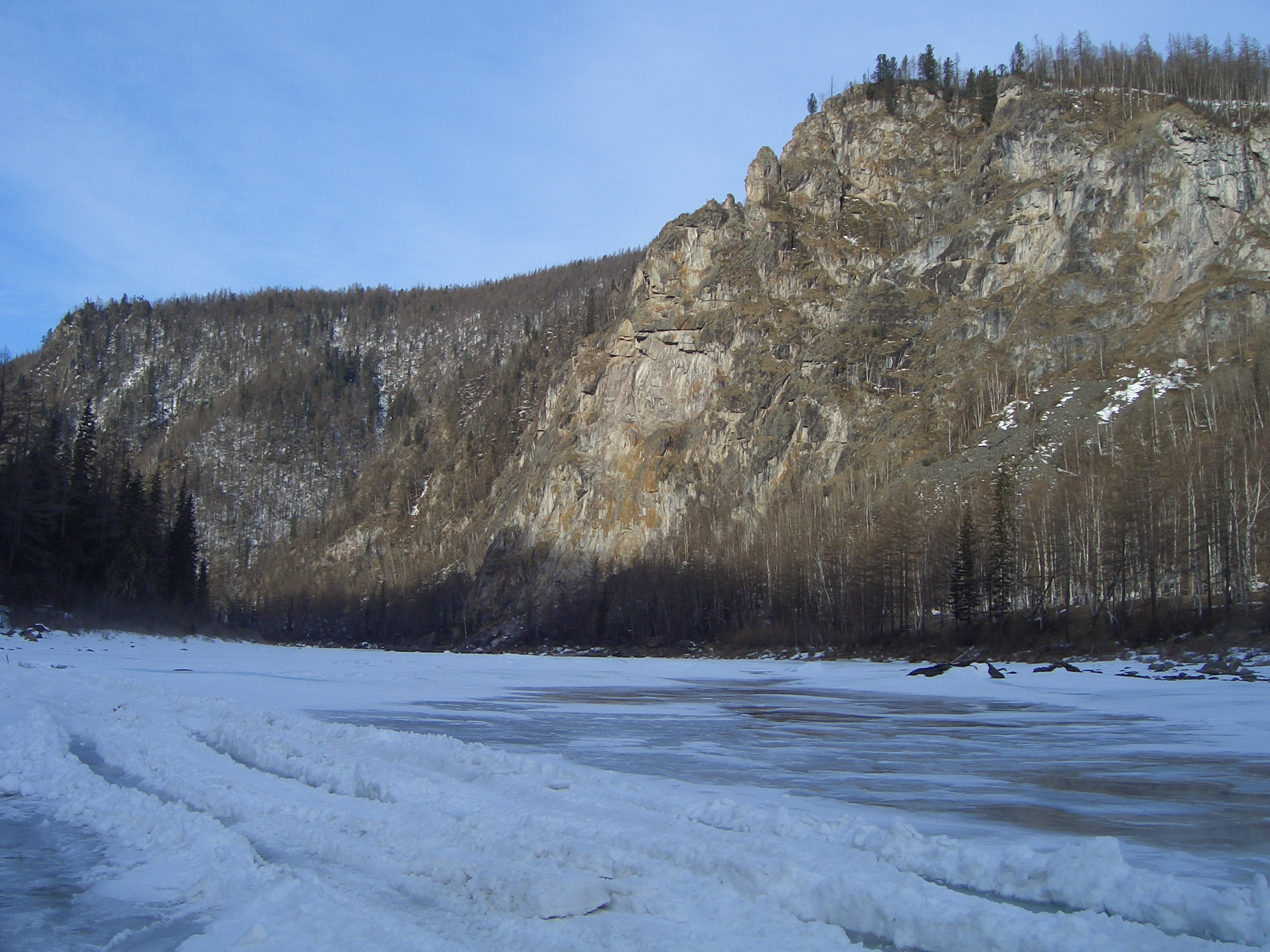
- Landscape of the region at the Uda Valley.

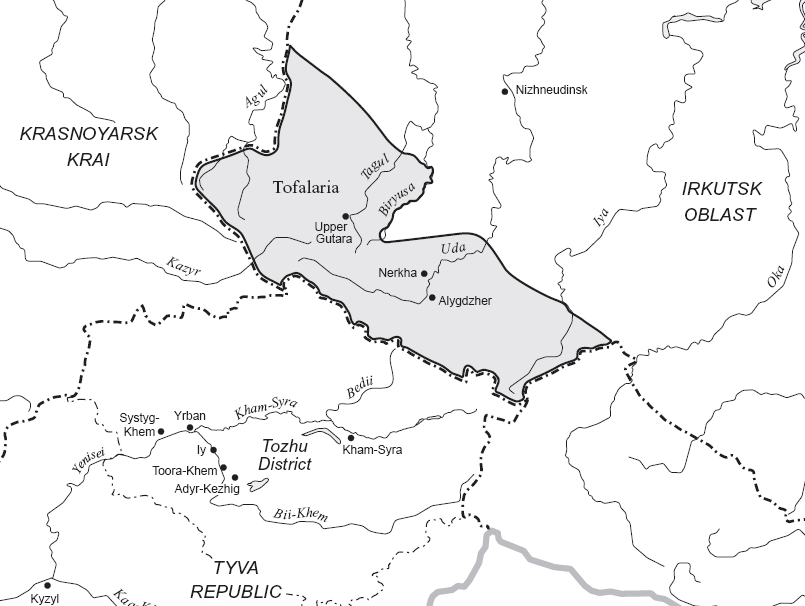

- Location in the Far Eastern Federal District, Russia
- Coordinates: 53°50′N 98°15′E
- Country: Russian Federation
- Federal subject: Irkutsk Oblast
- District: Nizhneudinsky District

Area
  - Total: 21,400 km^{2} (8,300 sq mi)
- Elevation: 918 m (3,012 ft)

Population
  - Total: 762
  - Density: 0.0356/km^{2} (0.0922/sq mi)
- Time zone: UTC+8

Tofalaria (Russian: Тофалария; Tofalar: Тофалар чурту, romanized: Tofalar çurtu) is a small cultural and historical region in Irkutsk Oblast, Russian Federation. It is located in the southwestern part of Nizhneudinsky District.

The main town is Alygdzher, with a population of 526 inhabitants. Other populated localities in Tofalaria include the towns of Verkhnyaya Gutara (Russian: Верхняя Гутара) and Nerkha (Russian: Нерха). Tofalars were originally divided into three groups. Those of the Northwestern group were settled in Verkhnyaya Gutara, those of the Southeastern group were settled in Alygdzher, and those of the central group were settled in Nerkha. The name of the village Alygdzher, translated from the Tofalar language, means “wind”.

Tofalaria is located in the Eastern Sayan mountains. The main river is the Uda.

== Symbols ==
The reindeer is one of the main symbols of Tofalaria. Historically, the reindeer has been very important to the Tofalar people. Reindeer were used traditionally as a form of transportation, and also to make food and clothing. Other symbols of Tofalaria include the mountains and the cedar branch.

== History ==
In the 17th century, the Russian Empire annexed the territory of Tofalaria. In 1939, at the time of the USSR, Tofalaria was part of the Tofalar National Region, a Soviet administrative division with a total surface of 29,000 km^{2} (11,000 sq mi) which was disbanded in 1950. In 1948, gold mining was stopped in Tofalaria and the region became part of the Nizhneudinsky District. The indigenous people of this little mountainous region are the Tofalar, a much reduced, formerly nomadic people group speaking the Tofa language.

== Expeditions to Tofalaria ==
Bernhard Eduardovich Petri organized an expedition to the Eastern Sayan region from 1925-1928, where he documented the lives of the Tofalar people. Petri wrote detailed reports about the economy, living conditions, and relationships with neighboring peoples in Tofalaria. Petri supported the right of Tofalars to preserve their own culture and advocated for improved living conditions in the region. In his reports, Petri described the construction of a cultural village, where initially, many poorer Tofalar families were settled. Petri sought to move this village away from Russian settlements in order to limit contact between Tofalars and Russians. As a result of Petri’s expedition, the Tofalars were granted member status of the Russian Association of Indigenous Peoples of the North.

There were several expeditions to Tofalaria in the 1990s organized by the Regional Scientific and Methodological Center of Folk Art. Expeditions sought to record and photograph aspects of Tofalar culture, including Tofalar art, music, games, and traditional clothing. Researchers also sought to restart the Argamchiyri holiday tradition.

== Land ==
Tofalaria has a land area of 27,000 square kilometers. The geography of the region is made up of two main features: approximately 90% of the territory belongs to the taiga and the other 10% is classified as alpine tundra. The territory has several large lakes. Agul'skoye Ozero is the third largest lake in the region, with a length of more than 10 kilometers. The 1.5 kilometer long Kusurgasheva glacier is also found in the region. The region has reserves of gold, lead, uranium, tantalum, and polymetals. Several industrial mining companies operate in the region.

== Climate ==
Tofalaria has a continental climate. The region experiences precipitation in the form of snow throughout most of the year. Snow cover lasts approximately 180 days of the year.

== The Tofalaria Natural Federal Preserve ==
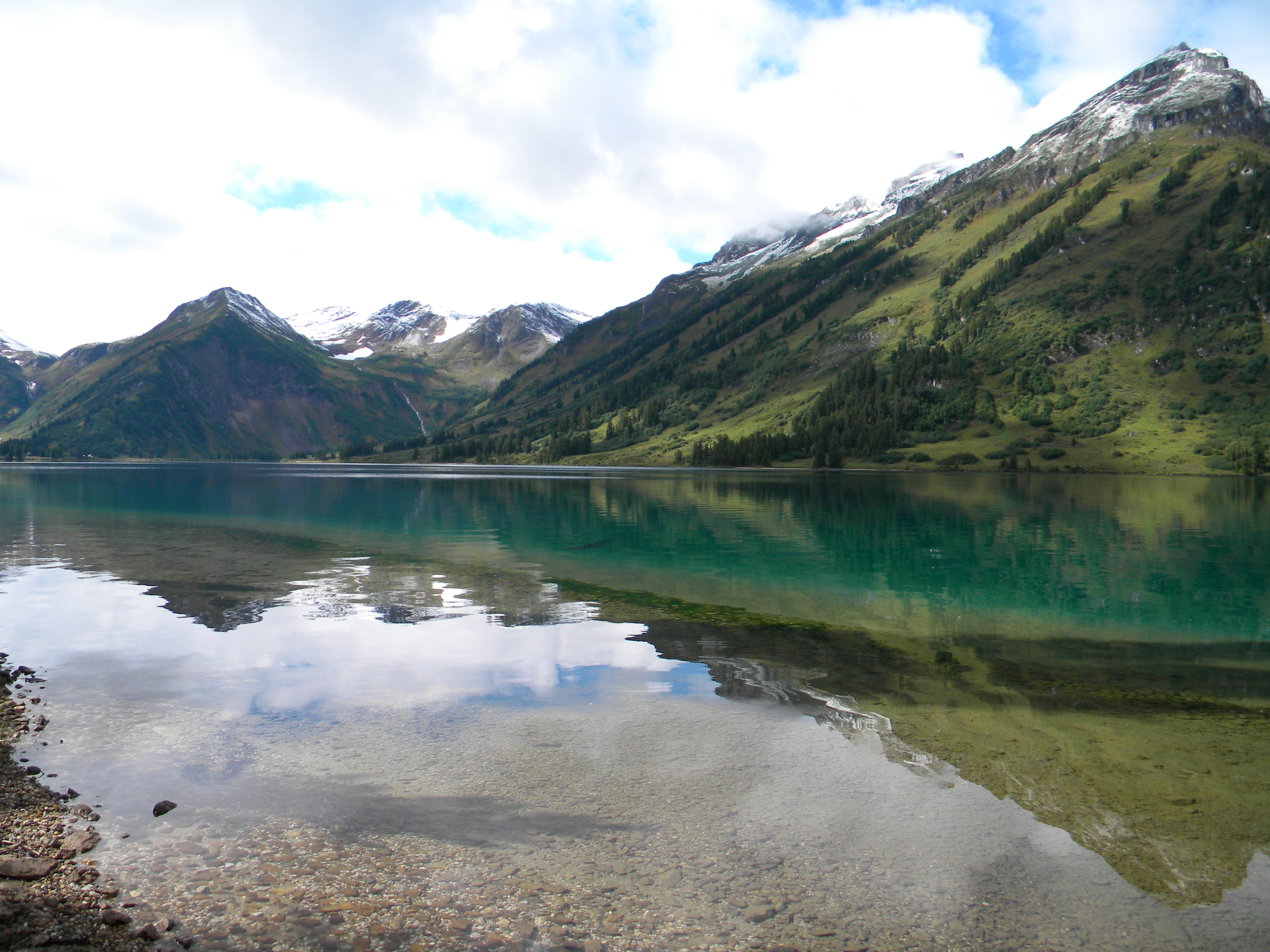
The Medvezhye Lake in the Tofalaria Natural Federal Preserve

The Tofalaria Natural Federal Preserve was established on August 12, 1971. It is found in the Eastern Sayan Mountains in Southwestern Tofalaria. The nature preserve was formerly part of the Sayan Natural Federal Preserve.

129 vertebrate and 30 invertebrate species can be found in Tofalaria. The region is home to eight endangered animal species, including the black stork, golden eagle, lesser white-fronted goose, osprey, white-tailed eagle, peregrine falcon, eurasian eagle-owl, and caribou. It is also home to seven endangered bird species.

According to an inventory of fauna completed in 2012, Tofalaria has 123 vascular plant species, 5 species of lichen, and 20 species of Bryophyte. Two species of vascular plants – Cypripedium macranthos and Common butterwort – are endangered. Cedar and deciduous vegetation dominates plant life in the region. Squirrels and sables rely on pine cones from cedar trees as one of their main food sources.

In 2018, the Tofalaria Natural Federal Preserve constructed 14 artificial nests in the region to combat habitat loss of the local osprey.

Tofalaria is considered the best habitat for snow leopards. Snow leopard spoor has consistently been observed in the region.

The local government has placed limits on the hunting of musk deer in the region.

In 2022, it was reported that, for the first time ever, a couple of whooper swans stayed in the Tofalaria Natural Federal Preserve for the winter.

=== Regulation ===
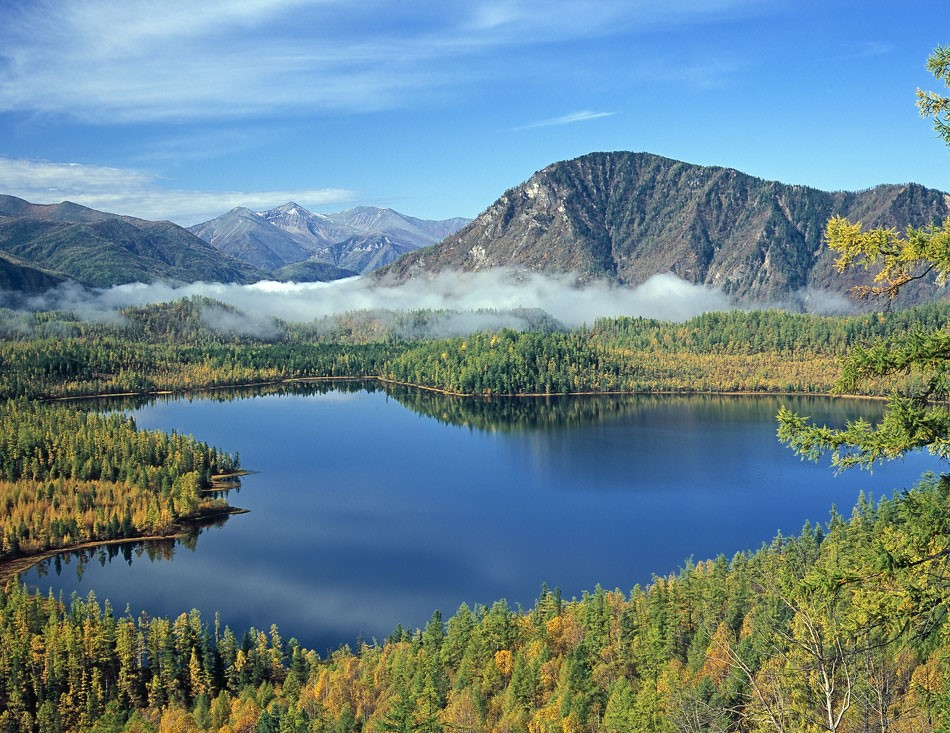
A view of the Gutarskie Lakes in Tofalaria

In 2013, the Irkutsk Oblast Court prohibited gold mining at two mining sites located within the Tofalaria Natural Federal Preserve. The court’s decision came after a 2012 investigation completed by the West Baikal Environmental Prosecutor's Office and the Krasnoyarsk Prosecutor's Office. The investigation determined that the Agul River watershed was heavily polluted with suspended solids and petroleum products. The company “Granul”, which was conducting gold mining operations in the area, was implicated in the pollution of the local watershed due to improper waste disposal and deforestation in the local ecosystem. This led to widespread fish death and the destruction of the benthic zone in the Agul River Watershed. The investigation concluded that the company “Granul”’s gold mining operations in Tofalaria were illegal. The court ordered the company to stop its operations in Tofalaria and restore the area.

In 2017, government investigators discovered unauthorized construction by poachers on the western border of the Tofalaria Natural Federal Preserve. The poachers first entered the preserve in 2014. They cut down twenty-three cedar trees in order to build log cabins, where they stayed while illegally hunting in the area. The poachers were arrested in February 2017 for illegally hunting the endangered Siberian Musk Deer in the boundaries of the federal preserve. Damages to the forest as a result of the illegal logging by the poachers totaled 500,000 rubles.

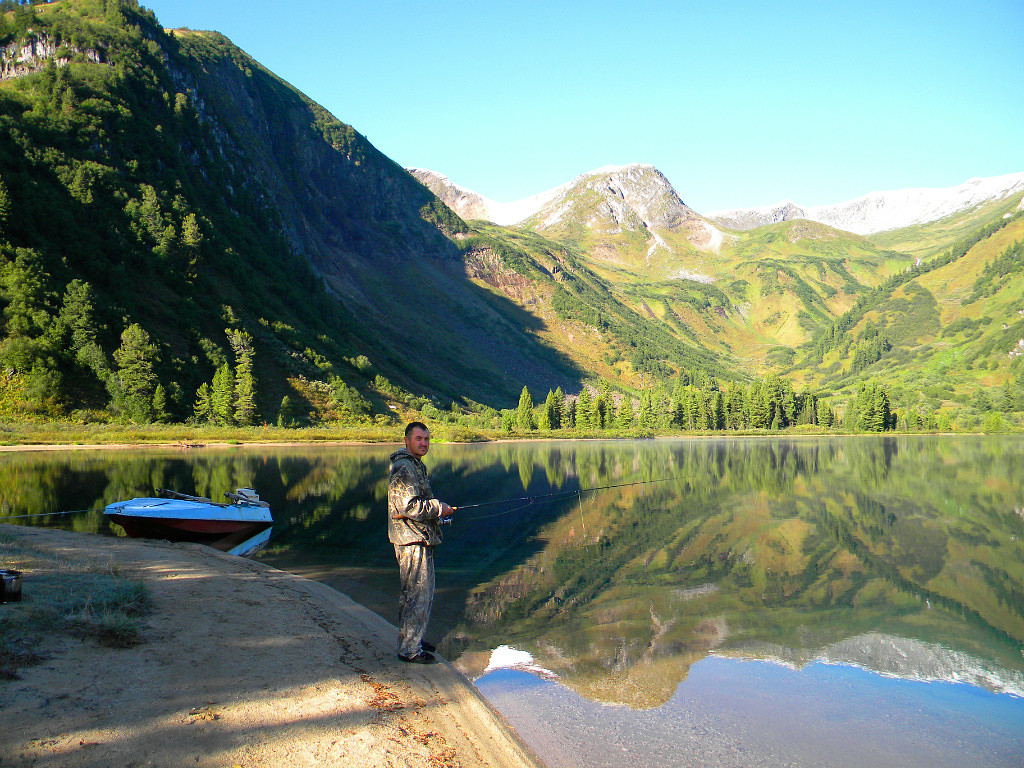
A person fishing in the Medvezheye Lake in the Tofalaria Natural Federal Preserve

In 2022, the Russian Federation opened a criminal case against the Irkutsk gold mining company “Yangoz” for environmental destruction in Tofalaria and the Tofalaria Natural Federal Preserve. The company constructed several homes, a bathouse, and a road within the boundaries of the Tofalaria Natural Federal Preserve. Additionally, Yangoz engaged in illegal logging and fishing operations in the preserve. As a result of the company’s activity in the region, approximately 40,000 square kilometers of fertile soil was lost. There was also a significant loss of invertebrate habitats in the preserve. Additionally, in a police raid, more than 700 Thymallus tails were discovered in the company’s base. The total environmental damages to the preserve are estimated to be approximately 3.5 billion rubles. The company claims to have been conducting a geological survey of the area, having received a license to explore land near the boundary of the Tofalaria Natural Federal Preserve in 2020. The company has agreed to pay a fine to cover the damages incurred due to its illegal fishing operations.

The government has previously fined tourists for illegally visiting the Tofalaria Natural Federal Preserve.

== Cultural Festivals ==
=== The Argamchiyri Games ===
The Argamchiyri (Tofalar: Аргамчи Ыры) holiday celebrations are regularly held every year in Tofalaria. Traditionally, the Argamchiyri holiday had an economic function: the Tofalar people sold and purchased goods during the celebrations. Now, the central goal of this holiday is to preserve and celebrate Tofalar culture. Celebrations include sports competitions, traditional rituals, and cultural fairs. The festival opens with a shamanistic ritual, where a shaman beseeches the spirits of the taiga for good weather and happiness during the holiday celebration.

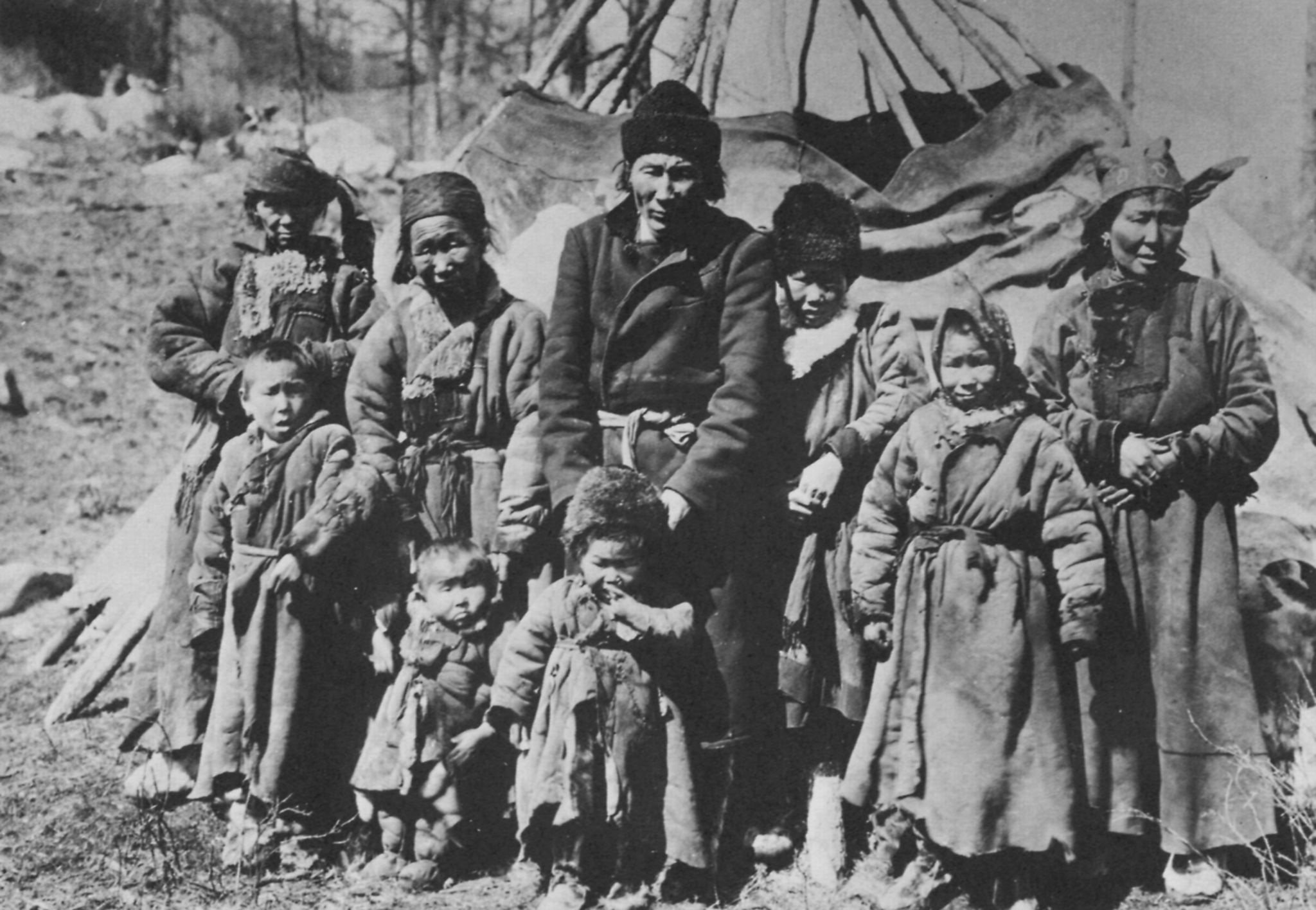
A 20th century Tofalar family in front of a chum

=== The Day of the Hunter and the Reindeer Herder ===
Traditionally, “The Day of the Hunter and the Reindeer Herder" was held in Tofalaria in the spring following the end of the hunting season. It was recently revived and is still held annually in the region. During this holiday, Tofalars hold a variety of reindeer races. They also host several other sports competitions, including throwing tynzians at trochees, jumps over sledges, cross-country skiing, triple jump, ax throwing, and the hunter’s biathlon. Other traditions include the construction of “chums", a traditional nomadic dwelling of the Tofalars. The chums are divided into two sides, the men’s side and the women’s side. The women’s side is decorated with cradles and sewing materials, while the men’s side is decorated with animal skins. Buhler and reindeer milk flatbread is served to guests to the chums. By tradition, a dog can be found in every chum.

=== Star of Tofalaria ===
Every year, Tofalaria holds the national holiday "Star of Tofalaria" (Tofalar: Сылтысчык Тофа, romanized: Syltysçyk Tofa). One of the main events of this holiday is a national children’s contest. The contest includes events like the performance of traditional dances, songs, and poems in the Tofalar language. The event is sponsored by the Regional Center of Folk Art and Leisure and the Alygdzhersky Rural House of Culture. The purpose of the holiday is to celebrate and familiarize young people with traditional Tofalar customs. Events during the celebration include the screening of films about the history of Tofalaria, round table discussions about topics relating to Tofalar culture, photo exhibitions, concerts, and masterclasses.

== Reindeer Herding ==
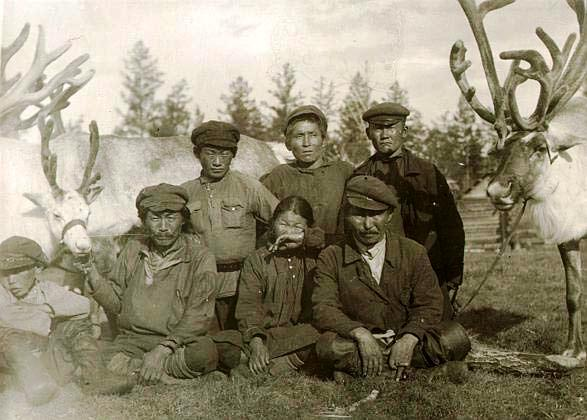
A group of Tofalar reindeer herders in Irkutsk Oblast, Nizhneudinsk District, at the beginning of the 20th century

Reindeer herding is a traditional form of subsistence in Tofalaria. According to local residents, over 600 reindeer were historically herded in Tofalaria. During the time of the Soviet Union, there was a reindeer herding state farm in the region. Following Perestroika, few reindeer remained in the region. In 2023, in the town of Verkhnyaya Gutara, according to local accounts, only one family still continued to herd reindeer. The family has approximately 60 reindeer. As of 2022, in Alygdzher, the local community maintains 300 reindeer. Local residents face challenges in herding reindeer due to the high operating cost and low profit from herding. Many reindeer herders are supported by private enterprises.

During the time of the Soviet Union, reindeer herding was a required subject in the region’s schools. Changes to local schools’ curricula that have excluded reindeer herding have prompted concerns over the possible loss of the practice in the region. This has led to several local cultural revitalization efforts in Tofalaria. There also exist state-sponsored programs to create a gene bank for the Tofalar reindeer.

== Education ==
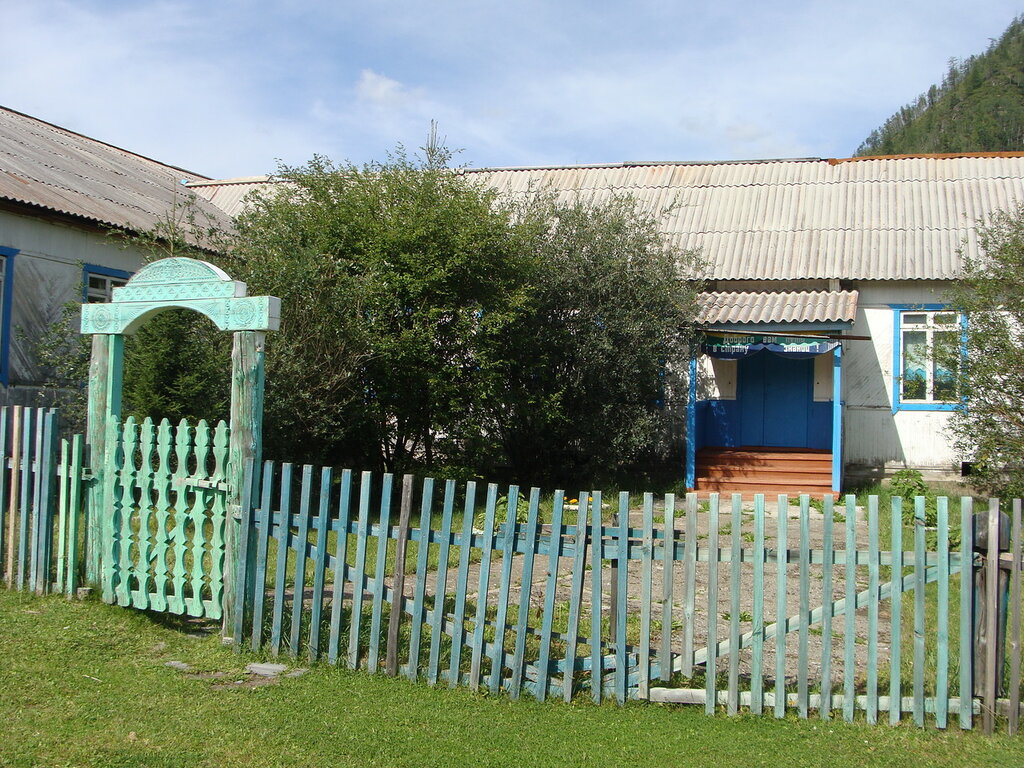
A school in Verkhnyaya Gutara

The first school in Tofalaria finished construction in 1923, following the Soviet Union’s forcible settlement of the Tofalars. The school was located in the town of Sasyrka. In 1926, a school opened in Alygdzher. At the time, education was conducted fully in Russian.

=== Impact of Flooding ===
The school in Alygdzher has experienced several floods over the course of its history. In 2019, floods forced the temporary closure of the school, with water levels in parts of the building reaching up to 40 cm high. In 2024, the construction of a new boarding school in Alygdzher was completed. The construction of the school was financed in part by the government of Moscow.

=== Education in the Tofalar Language ===
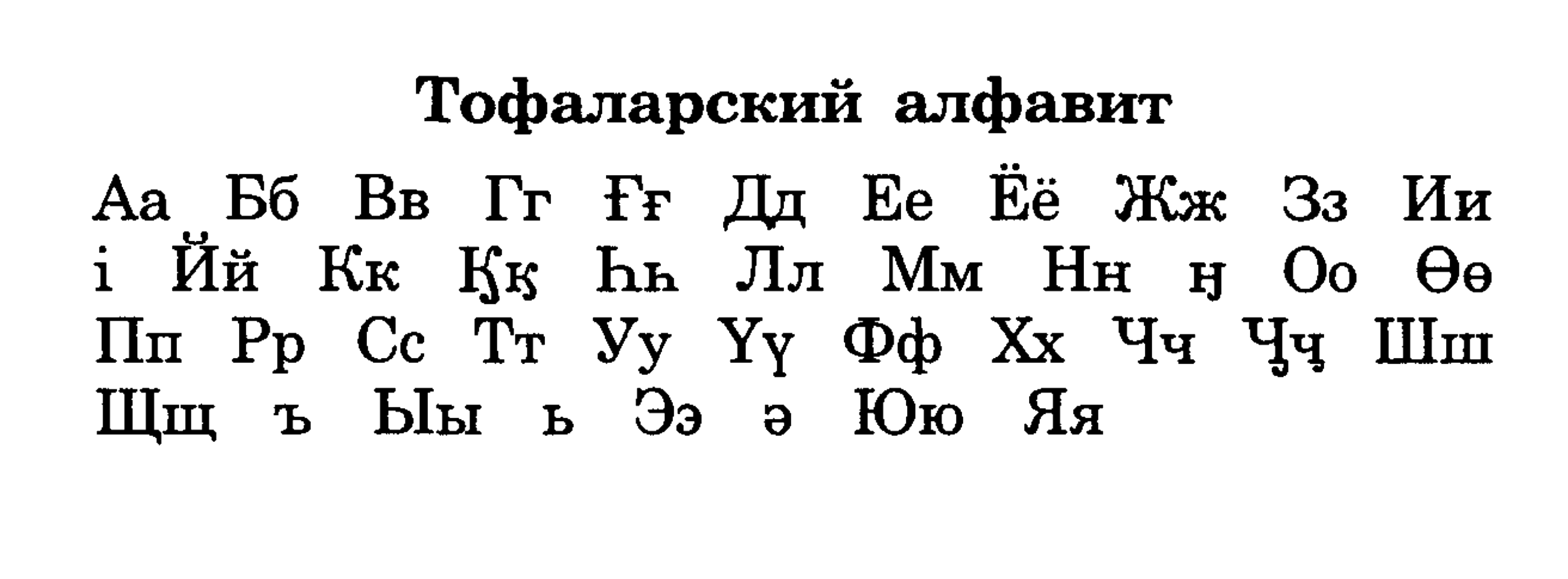
The Tofalar language alphabet

The Tofalar language is spoken in the territory of Tofalaria.

The Tofalar language is critically endangered and currently has only 40 native speakers worldwide. All known speakers in Tofalaria are over 40 years of age.

The Tofalar language is part of the curriculum of the elementary school in Alygdzher. Much of the education in the language is done through audio. In 2020, a special course was created to teach students the Tofalar language using VR headsets. Students would learn new words in Tofalar by being shown an object and its corresponding name in Russian, English, and Tofalar through the VR headset.

Alygdzher’s ethno-cultural center hosts classes in the Tofalar language for adults. During these classes, adults learn to read and write in the language. Due to the fact that a writing system for the language was only created in 1988, most native speakers are unable to read or write.

== Infrastructure ==
=== Public Transportation ===
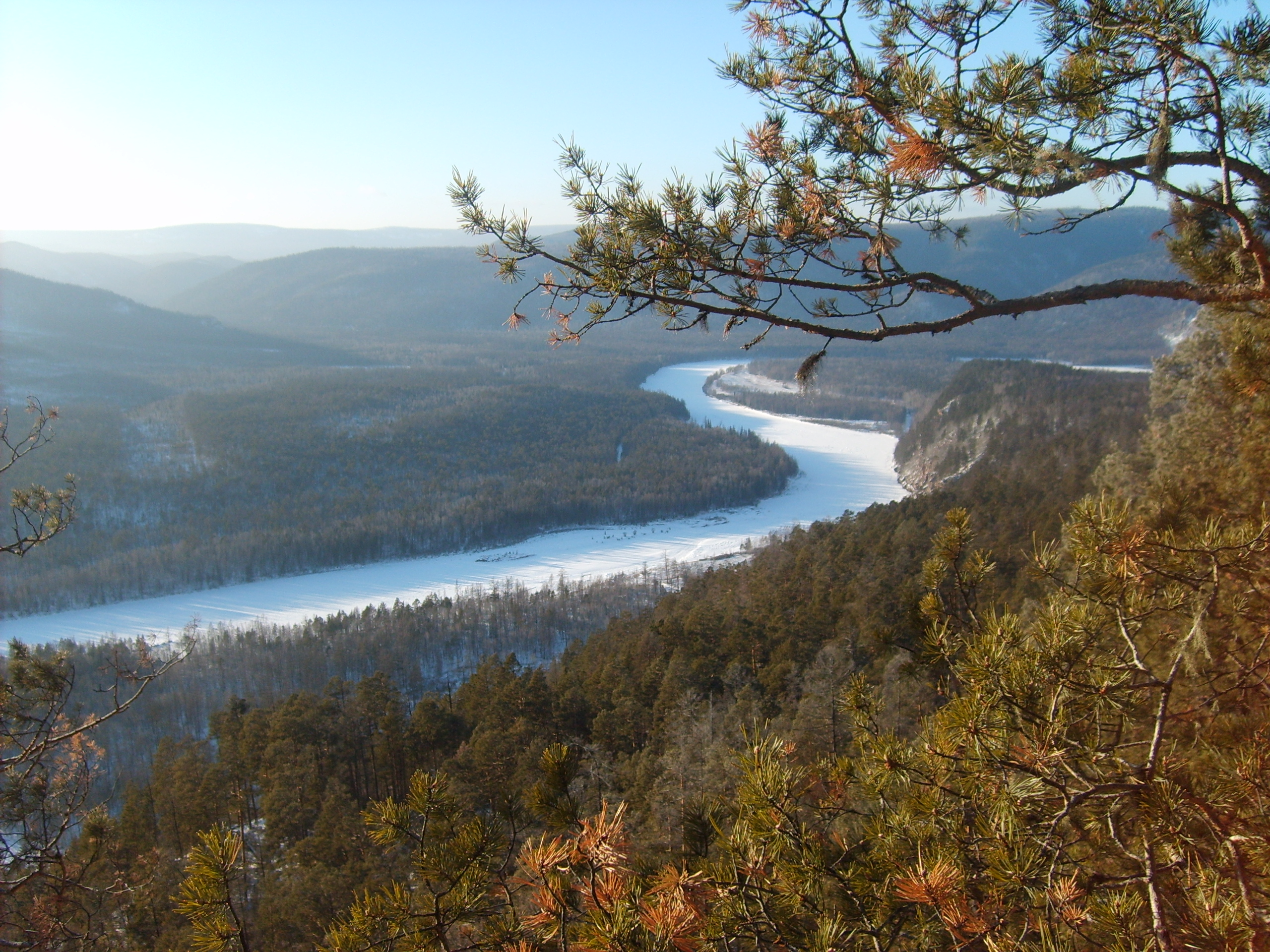
The Uda River in Tofalaria freezes solid during the winter.

Tofalaria has no roads. It has several nature trails. The region is not accessible by car. Locals use helicopters as their main form of transportation between Tofalaria and other parts of the Irkutsk Oblast. The Nizhneudinsk Air Squad operates flights to the region. Due to resource constraints, flights are only available once per week.

The region often receives aid from the oblast government to cover the cost of additional flights. In 2023, the Irkutsk Oblast Parliament allocated 10 million additional rubles for the transport of food and other goods to Tofalaria “Russian state program “Development of the transport complex of the Irkutsk region”. Similarly, in 2018, the region received funds for diesel fuel for helicopters. Recent efforts have also sought to increase the amount of goods transported to Tofalaria.

In the winter, people can travel to Tofalaria over the Uda River via an ice road.

=== Burials ===
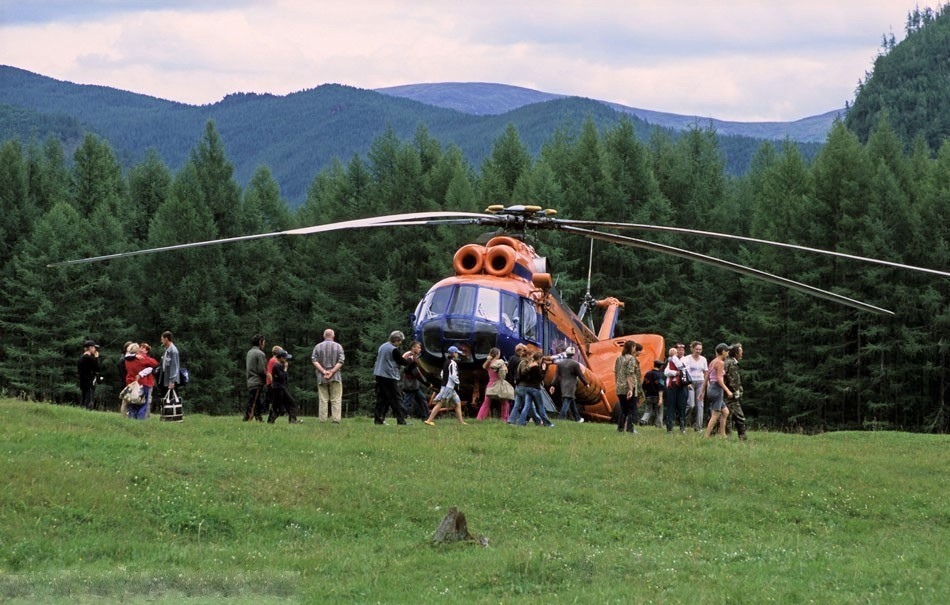
A helicopter lands in Verkhnyaya Gutara in Tofalaria.

Due to the difficulty of traveling to Nizhneudinsk, local residents are often not able to acquire death certificates for relatives that have passed away. By Russian law, a forensic examination must be completed by a morgue in order for a death certificate to be issued. However, the nearest morgue is located approximately 300 km away in the town of Nizhneudinsk. Transporting a deceased person to Nizhneudinsk and back is very expensive: local residents would have to spend approximately 700,000 rubles to hire a helicopter for the purpose. As a result, many Tofalars are buried without documentation. According to Vladimir Lobchenko, the head of the Alygdzher administration, as of 2019, 12 deceased Tofalars were not issued death certificates and were still registered to vote in elections.

=== Construction of Dams ===
In Alygdzher, following a flood in 2019 that destroyed a significant amount of the town’s property, including its school, a dam was constructed to protect the town from future floods. The dam is 3.5 kilometers in length and protects the town against flooding from the Uda River. The project cost 81 million rubles, 64 million of which came from the budget of the federal government and 17 million of which came from the budget of the Irkutsk Oblast government. Construction of the dam was finished in October 2021.

=== Government Funding ===
The Irkutsk Oblast project “People's Initiatives” (Russian: Народных инициатив) funds infrastructure improvement projects in Alygdzher, Nerkha, and Verkhnyaya Gutara. In 2018, 360,000 rubles were allocated to the villages for public works projects. Past projects funded by the initiative include the renovation of the local house of culture, the purchase of lamps for street lighting, the installation of benches on village streets, the renovation of wells, and the construction of a children’s playground.

== Photovoltaic Power Stations ==
Several photovoltaic power stations for sustainable electricity generation have been constructed or are under construction in Tofalaria. These power stations are part of projects to reconstruct the power supply system in populated regions of Tofalaria. Officials also seek to reduce the volume of diesel fuel imported and consumed by the region. As of 2020, 230 tons of diesel fuel was purchased by the local government every year to power the generation of electricity in Tofalaria.

The first photovoltaic power station was opened in Nerkha in 2017. It has a budget of 77.6 million rubles. The capacity of the power plant is 121.5 kilowatts. The local minister of housing, energy, and transport estimated that the power station will allow the region to save up to 50 tons of diesel fuel.

A second power station, called ANGA-2, was constructed in 2021 in Verkhnyaya Gutara. The cost of construction was estimated to be approximately 131.4 million rubles. It was projected that completing the construction of the power station would reduce the demand for diesel fuel by 46%.

Currently, the construction of another photovoltaic power station is planned to finish in late 2025. This power station will provide electricity to Nerkha, Alygdzher, and Verkhnyaya Gutara. Its estimated budget is 190 million rubles. The station itself will be powered by solar and diesel energy.

== Medical Care ==
Locals to Tofalaria report difficulty accessing medical care due to the scarcity of flights from the region to locations with working hospitals. Currently, in several villages, such as Verkhnyaya Gutara, there only exist feldsher-midwife points (FAPs), a preventive institution that provides pre-hospital primary health care in rural areas in Russia. In 2021, two new feldsher-midwife points opened in Tofalaria. They will serve the villages of Verkhnyaya Gutara and Nerkha. These new FAPs will replace the previous ones, which were built in the 1930s. The construction of the FAPs is sponsored by the Irkutsk Oblast and federal governments.

== Government Services ==
In 2018, the Irkutsk Oblast government opened offices in the villages of Verkhnyaya Gutara and Alygdzher. The purpose of the offices was to reduce the burden of travel to Nizhneudinsk and reduce waiting times for the residents of Tofalaria for required government documents. The government also installed satellite dishes and payment terminals in the villages.

== Local Museum ==
In 1994, local historian Mikhail Ivanovich Pugachev collected a variety of traditional Tofalar cultural objects for the founding of a museum in Alygdzher. The museum has a collection of 288 cultural Tofalar objects. The collection includes traditional clothing, hunting equipment, and shamanic objects.

== Ethnocultural Centers ==
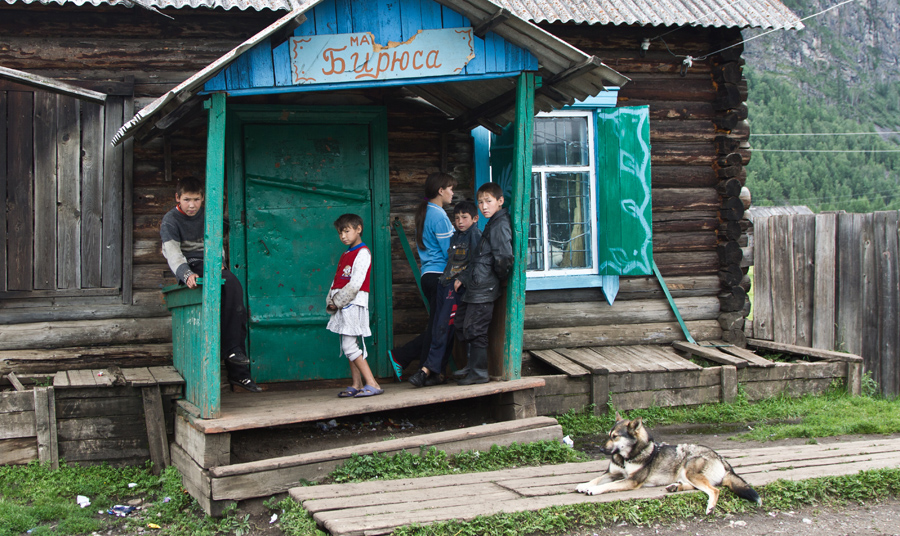
A group of Tofalar youth in the village of Verkhnyaya Gutara

In 1991, an ethno-cultural center was founded in Alygdzher, Tofalaria, as part of local efforts to revive Tofalar culture. The ethno-cultural center is involved in preserving traditional Tofalar music, legends, and language. The center’s efforts has resulted in the founding of a folkloric ensemble “Dyyrakibiler” (Tofalar: «Дыыракибилер»), which translates as “quick-footed reindeer”. The center also teaches Tofalar children traditional dances and crafts. It also hosts Tofalar language classes that give Tofalar native speakers the opportunity to learn reading and writing in the Tofalar language. A similar ethno-cultural center also exists in the village of Nerkha.

== Tourism ==
Tourism in Tofalaria is not well developed. There exist some organized tour guides in the region. Historically, there was an interest in creating a local Tofalar ethnic park.

In 2020, Fodor’s Travel Guide named Tofalaria as one of the top 10 locations for ecotourism in Russia. The guide described Tofalaria as “a rainy, misty, impenetrable land of taiga forest, deep canyons, and fast-flowing rivers and creeks.”

== Flooding ==
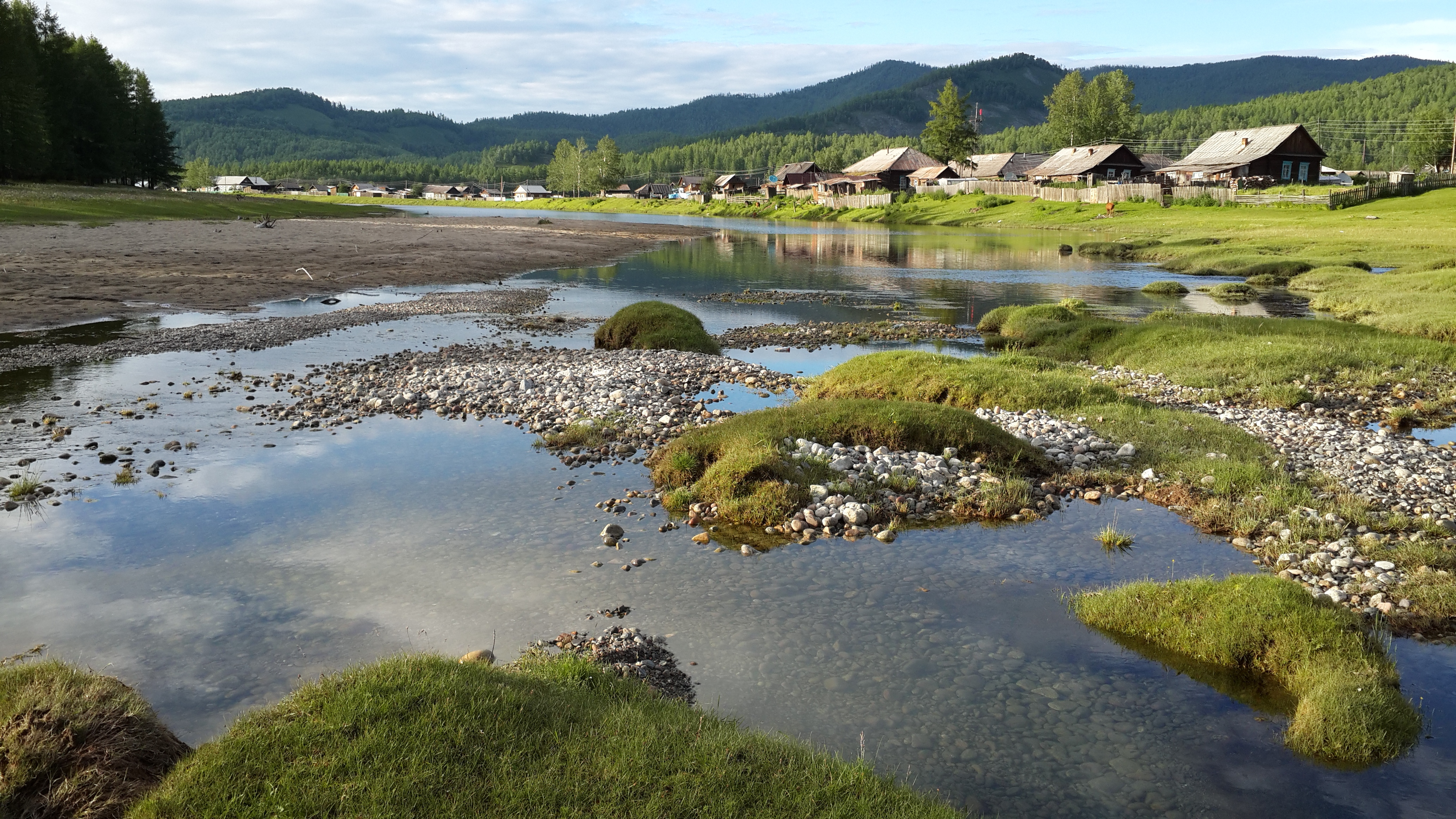
The Uda River by the town of Alygdzher

In 2019, flooding in Irkutsk resulted in significant damage to the region, including to the town of Alygdzher in Tofalaria. 193 residential buildings and properties in Alygdzher experienced the effects of the flood. 84 homes were completely destroyed, while 39 needed major renovation. In addition, the flood destroyed many residents’ vegetable plots. In response to the flooding, the Irkutsk government offered to evacuate Tofalars to Nizhneudisnk. The Irkutsk government also sponsored the delivery of construction materials and the delivery of heavy machinery to Tofalaria in order to repair Tofalar homes and schools. Additionally, 137 Tofalar families received government certificates for the purchase of new housing. As a result of the flood, a dam was constructed on the Uda River.

== See also ==
- Kinzelyuk Waterfall
- Pik Tofalariya
