= Udinsk, Republic of Buryatia =

Udinsk Удинск
- Selo
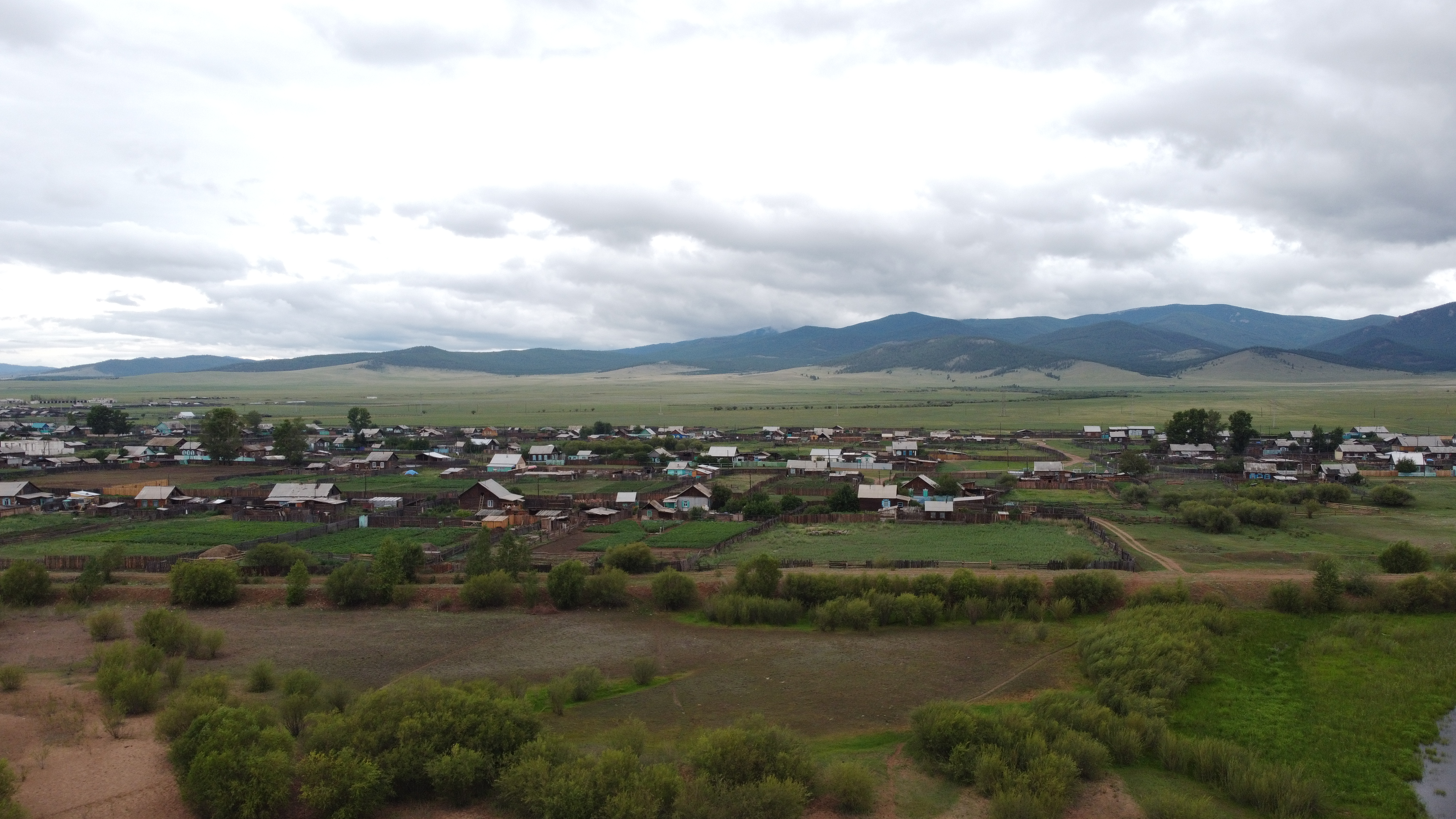

- Location within Republic of Buryatia Location within Russia
- Coordinates: 52°08′N 109°12′E
- Country: Russia
- Region: Republic of Buryatia
- District: Khorinsky District
- Time zone: UTC+8:00
- Postal code: 671420

Udinsk (Russian: Удинск; Buryat: Хахирай Үртөө, Khakhirai Ürtöö) is a rural locality (a selo) in Khorinsky District, Republic of Buryatia, Russia. The population was 719 as of 2010. There are 10 streets.

== Geography ==
Udinsk is located 43 km west of Khorinsk (the district's administrative centre) by road. Tarbagatay is the nearest rural locality.
