= Tuha language =

Moribund Turkic language of Mongolia

Tuha
- Uighur Uryangkhai, Khövsgöl Uryangkhay
- Tuha
- Pronunciation: [tuʰha] [tuˤha]
- Native to: Mongolia
- Region: Tsagaan-Üür, Khövsgöl
- Ethnicity: 600 Tuha (Urianghai)
- Native speakers: <10 (2019)
- Language family: Turkic: Common Turkic; Siberian Turkic; South Siberian; Sayan Turkic; Taiga Sayan Turkic; Tuha
- Dialects: Soyt; Arig Urianghai; Övör Širkheten; Görööčin Urianghai

Language codes
- ISO 639-3: None (mis)
- Glottolog: tuha1234
- ELP: Tuha
- Khövsgöl Uryangkhay is classified as Critically Endangered by the UNESCO Atlas of the World's Languages in Danger

Tuha, also called Uighur Uryangkhai and Khövsgöl Uryangkhay, is a moribund variety of Tofa or an independent language spoken east of Lake Khövsgöl in northern Mongolia by less than 10 people. Even though it was taught in schools during the 1970s, during which it was investigated by the Mongolian linguist Luvsandorjiyn Bold, it is now nearly extinct.

== Classification ==
Tuha is a member of the Sayan Turkic branch of Siberian Turkic. It has preserved archaic features lost elsewhere in Sayan Turkic. According to Juha Janhunen, it is best classified as a language for taxonomic purposes and language revitalization. According to Elisabetta Ragagnin, Tuha shares isoglosses with Tofa, Altai and Old Turkic.

It is believed that the Tuha originally were Soyots that separated from them around 400 years ago.

== Phonology ==
=== Vowels ===
Tuha vowels
	Front	Central	Back
Close	i (Note: [ɪ] is an allophone of [i].)	ɨ (Note: [ɑ], [ɔ] are allophones.)	u (Note: [ʊ] is an allophone.)
Mid	e (Note: [ɛ] is an allophone.)		o (Note: May be pronounced as [a] in first syllables.)
Open		a	

=== Consonants ===
The nasal palatal approximant [j̃] occurs in Tuha, as with all other Taiga Sayan languages. For example, the words añaq 'cup' (<Mongolian: аяга), ñaš 'tree' (<*ɨɣaš), mɨñaq~mɨyaq 'dung', ñaaq 'chin, jaw', ñeŋ 'anus', and yaa~ñaa 'new' have it.

== Vocabulary ==
In the 1970s, Tuha took over 30% of its vocabulary from Mongolian. This can be seen from the word for böhkčinǝ ~ böhkčino 'wolf', which seems to come from the Mongolian word börte činō 'blue-grey wolf'. Tuha also has preserved the archaic features of Sayan Turkic that are not documented in the other Sayan Turkic languages.

Where Tuha has the word keeš- /keeǰir/ 'to say', in Tofa this word is far more limited in usage, and is used only relating to marriage arrangements (cf. Tofa heešken qɨs 'bride).
