= Valentin Rassadin =

Russian linguist (1939–2017)

- Валентин Иванович Рассадин
- Born: November 12, 1939; Pskov, USSR
- Died: August 15, 2017 (aged 77); Elista, Kalmykia, Russia

Academic background
- Education: Leningrad State University
- Alma mater: Novosibirsk State University
- Thesis: Лексика современного тофаларского языка (1967)

Academic work
- Discipline: Linguistics, Philology
- Sub-discipline: Mongolian studies, Turkology
- Institutions: Siberian Branch of the Russian Academy of Sciences, Buryat State University, Kalmyk State University
- Main interests: Tofa language, Soyot-Tsaatan language, Buryat language

Valentin Ivanovich Rassadin (Russian: Валенти́н Ива́нович Расса́дин; November 12, 1939 – August 15, 2017) was a Soviet and Russian linguist. He is best known for his documentation and studies of the Tofa language and Soyot-Tsaatan language.

== Biography ==
Rassadin was born in Pskov, Soviet Union on November 12, 1939, into an Izhorian family. He spent much of his childhood with his Izhorian grandmother, from whom he learned Izhorian songs and some of the Izhorian language. The Nazi German army occupied Pskov in 1941, and in 1943 Rassadin and his mother were sent to a labor camp in Lithuania. After the war, Rassadin's family moved throughout the Soviet Union with his father's military career. During these travels he learned some Tatar from a classmate and became interested in the similarities between the languages he had learned. He graduated high school in 1957 in Kholmsk, Sakhalin.

In 1957 he entered Leningrad State University's Oriental Faculty to study Mongolian philology. He received permission to attend lectures in Turkic philology and studied the Old Turkic language. He graduated in 1962. After graduating he worked as a Mongolian translator for the Soviet Ministry of Construction in the Mongolian city of Darkhan.

Rassadin returned to higher education in 1963 at Novosibirsk State University where he studied Turkic languages. From 1964 to 1976 Rassadin went on a number of expeditions to study the Tofa people and their language. During this time he lived among the Tofa and worked alongside them. There he studied the Tofa language, and in 1967 he defended his dissertation on the vocabulary of the Tofa language.

Rassadin worked at the Siberian Branch of the Russian Academy of Sciences from 1966 to 2006. From 1992 to 2006 he served part-time as the chair of the Department of Central Asian philology at Buryat State University. From 2006 onward he served as the director of the Scientific Center for Mongolian and Altaic Studies at Kalmyk State University, while also teaching in the departments of Kalmyk language and Mongolian studies.

Rassadin died on August 15, 2017. The Head of the Republic of Buryatia and the People's Khural expressed their condolences.

== Research ==
Rassadin's research focused primarily on the Tofa and Soyot languages, but he wrote extensively on the Buryat language and other languages of southern Siberia.

Rassadin is credited with helping to preserve the moribund Tofa language. In 1989 he created a Cyrillic alphabet for Tofa and promoted the teaching of Tofa in schools. He attempted to do the same for Soyot, publishing dictionaries and grammars. He was one of the few people to have studied the Tuha language, a nearly-extinct language related to both Tofa and Soyot spoken in Tsagaan-Üür, Khövsgöl, Mongolia.

== Selected publications ==
- Рассадин, В.И. (1971). Fonetika i leksika tofalarskogo yazyka Фонетика и лексика тофаларского языка [Phonetics and lexicon of the Tofalar language] (in Russian). Улан-Удэ: Бурятское книжное изд-во. OCLC 21763909.
- Рассадин, В. И. (1995). Tofalarsko-russky slovar, russko-tofalarsky Тофаларско-русский словарь, русско-тофаларский [Tofalar-Russian dictionary, Russian-Tofalar] (in Russian). Иркутск: Вост.-Сиб. кн. изд-во. ISBN 9785742406594. OCLC 39288005.
- Rassadin, Valentin Ivanovič (2010). Kempf, Béla (ed.). "Soyotica". Studia Uralo-altaica. Studiauralo-altaica. 48: 1–229. doi:10.14232/sua.2010.48.1-229. ISBN 978-963-306-027-8.
- Рассадин, В.И. (2012). Yazyk soyotov Buryatii Язык сойотов Бурятии [The language of the Soyots of Buryatia] (in Russian). Элиста: Издательство Калмыцкийго университета. ISBN 9785914581111. OCLC 885093187.
- Рассадин, В.И. (2014). Tofalarsky yazyk i ego mesto v sisteme tyurkskikh yazykov Тофаларский язык и его место в системе тюркских языков [The Tofalar language and its place in the system of Turkic languages] (in Russian). Элиста: Калмыцкийгосударственный университет. ISBN 9785914581326. OCLC 900161706.

== Awards and honors ==
- 1980. Honored scientist of the Buryat ASSR
- 1988. Corresponding member of the Finno-Ugrian Society
- 1990. Honored scientist of the RSFSR
- 1999. Silver Sigma award of the Siberian Branch of the Russian Academy of Sciences
- 2001. Order of Friendship
- 2005. First recipient of the "Recognition" award of Buryatia, along with a diploma and a gold "Aldar solo" medal
- 2008. Member of the Russian Committee of Turkologists
- 2009. "Civil Valor" award from the Sakha Republic
- 2009. Honorary professor of
- 2014. Mongolian Order of the Polar Star
- 2014. Honored professor of Buryat State University
- 2014. Honorary doctor of the Institute of Mongolian, Buddhist, and Tibetan Studies of the Siberian Branch of the Russian Academy of Sciences

== Bibliography ==
- Дыбо, А. В.; Салаев, Б. К.; Трофимова, С. М. (2014). "Его путь в науке (к 75-летию Валентина Ивановича Рассадина)" (PDF). Урало-алтайские исследования. 14: 68–73. ISSN 2500-2902.
- Дыбо, А. В.; Салаев, Б. К.; Трофимова, С. М. (2017). "Валентин Иванович Рассадин" (PDF). Урало-алтайские исследования. 27: 144–146. ISSN 2500-2902.
- Грунтов, И. А. (2017). "Валентин Иванович Рассадин (12 ноября 1939 — 15 августа 2017)" (PDF). Урало-алтайские исследования. 27: 147–149. ISSN 2500-2902.
- Актуальные проблемы монголоведных и алтаистических исследований: Материалы III Международной научной конференции, посвященной 80-летию академика РАЕН, профессора В. И. Рассадина, 30-летию создания тофаларской письменности и 20-летию сойотской письменности, 11-14 ноября 2019 г. B. K. Salaev. Элиста: Калмыцкий государственный университет. 2019. ISBN 978-5-91458-324-5. OCLC 1154769515.
- Dyakieva, Baldzhiya; Omakaeva, Ellara; Ochirova, Nina; Ochirova, Nyudlya; Selninov, Vladislav (2020-10-31). "V.I. Rassadin In The Space Of Turkic-Mongolian Linguistics And Culture". The European Proceedings of Social and Behavioural Sciences: 3216–3221. doi:10.15405/epsbs.2020.10.05.427. eISSN 2357-1330. S2CID 228974847.
