= Tofa language =

Moribund Northeastern Turkic language

Tofa
- Tofalar, Karagas
- Тоъфа дыл To'fa dyl
- Pronunciation: [t̪ɔˤfa d̪ɯl̪]
- Native to: Russia
- Region: Tofalariya, Irkutsk Oblast
- Ethnicity: Tofalar
- Native speakers: 67 (2020 census)
- Language family: Turkic: Common Turkic; Siberian Turkic; South Siberian; Sayan Turkic; Taiga Sayan Turkic; Tofa

Language codes
- ISO 639-3: kim
- Glottolog: kara1462 Taiga Sayan Turkic tofa1248 Tofa
- ELP: Tofa
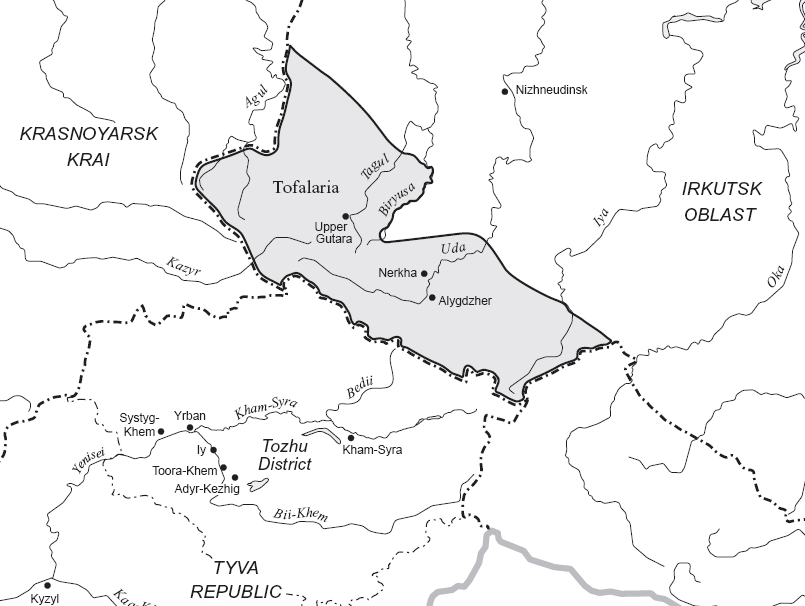
- Tofalaria, the region inhabited by the Tofalar

- Tofa is classified as Critically Endangered by the UNESCO Atlas of the World's Languages in Danger.

Tofa (Тоъфа дыл, Tòfa dıl), also known as Tofalar or Karagas, is a Turkic language spoken in Irkutsk Oblast, Russia by the Tofalar, an indigenous people of Siberia. Tofa forms a dialect continuum with the closely related Tuvan language, and shares many features with it. Tofa is a critically endangered language, as classified by the UNESCO Atlas of the World's Languages in Danger, and recent estimates for speakers run from 67 to fewer than 40 individuals.

== Classification ==
Tofa is most closely related to the Tuvan language and forms a dialect continuum with it. Tuha and Tsengel Tuvan may be dialects of either Tuvan or Tofa. Tofa shares a number of features with these languages, including the preservation of *d as /d/ (as in hodan 'hare'; compare Uzbek quyon) and the development of low tones on historically short vowels (as in *et > èt 'meat, flesh').

Alexander Vovin (2017) notes that Tofa and other Siberian Turkic languages, especially Sayan Turkic, have Yeniseian loanwords.

== Geographic and demographic distribution ==
The Tofa, who are also known as the Tofalar or Karagas, are an indigenous people living in southwestern Irkutsk Oblast, in Russia. The region they inhabit is informally known as Tofalariya. They are traditionally a nomadic reindeer-herding people, living on or near the Eastern Sayan mountain range. However, reindeer herding has greatly declined since the 20th century, with only one Tofa family continuing the practice as of 2004. Recognized by the former USSR in 1926 as one of the "Small Numbered Minorities of the North," (Russian: коренные малочисленные народы Севера, Сибири и Дальнего Востока) the Tofa have special legal status and receive economic support from Russia. The Tofa population is around 750 people; around 5% of the population spoke Tofa as a first language in 2002, (although that number has likely declined since then, due to the age of the speakers). Although the population of Tofalaria appears to be growing, the number of ethnic Tofalar seems to be in decline.

=== Effects of language contact ===
Language contact—mainly with Russian speakers—has been extensive since 1926, when the Tofa officially received their "Small Numbered Minorities of the North" status from the USSR and underwent significant cultural, social, and economic changes. Most notably, this traditionally nomadic, reindeer-herding people have since become sedentary and reindeer herding has all but vanished among the Tofa. In addition to visiting tax collectors and tourists, many other Russians have come to the Sayan mountain range to live. Russian migration and intermarriage also has had an effect, according to a citation by Donahoe: "In 1931, of a total population in Tofalaria of 551, approximately 420 (76%) were Tofa, and the remaining 131 (24%) were non-Tofa, predominantly Russian (Mel'nikova 1994:36 and 231). By 1970, the population in Tofalaria had increased to 1368, of whom 498 (36%) were Tofa, and 809 (59%) were Russian (Sherkhunaev 1975:23)."(p. 159) There were approximately 40 speakers of various fluency levels by 2002, and this number has likely continued to decrease in the intervening time.

== Phonology ==
=== Vowels ===
The following table lists the vowels of Tofa. The data was taken from Ilgın and Rassadin.

	Front		Back	
	short	long	short	long
Close	i, y	iː, yː	ɯ, u	ɯː, uː
Near-close	ɪ	ɪː		
Open-mid	ɛ, œ	ɛː, œː	ɔ	ɔː
Open	æ	æː	ɑ	ɑː

Rassadin also indicates that Tofa has a short [ĭ]. All vowels except [æ] can be pharyngealized [◌ˤ]. According to Rassadin pharyngealization is realized as creaky voice [◌̰]; Harrison and Anderson represent this feature as low tone.

=== Consonants ===
The following table lists the consonants of Tofa. The data was taken from Ilgın and Rassadin.

	Labial	Alveolar	Palatal	Velar	Uvular	Glottal
Nasal	m	n	ɲ	ŋ	ɴ	
Plosive	p, b	t, d	c, ɟ	k, g	q, ɢ	ʔ
Fricative	f, v	s, z	ʃ, ʒ	ɣ	ʁ	h, hʲ
Affricate			t͡ʃ, d͡ʒ			
Liquid		l, ɾ				
Glide			j			

=== Vowel harmony ===
Many dialects of Tofa exhibit vowel harmony, although this harmony seems to be linked to fluency: as one decreases, so does the other. Tofa vowel harmony is progressive and based on two features: backness and rounding, and this occurs both root-internal and in affixes. Enclitics do not appear to trigger backness harmony, and rounding harmony in Tofa has been undergoing changes, and may apply inconsistently. In some cases this may be due to opaque rules resulting in an apparent "disharmony", especially among speakers of the younger generation. The complications surrounding Tofa vowel harmony may also be due to fluctuations from language endangerment. In general, Russian loanwords do not appear to conform to vowel harmony. Given the increasing quantity of these loanwords, leveling may also be a factor in the inconsistent application of vowel harmony.

== Writing system ==
Tofa, although not often written, employs a Cyrillic alphabet:

А а	Б б	В в	Г г	Ғ ғ	Д д	Е е
Ә ә	Ё ё	Ж ж	З з	И и	I i	Й й
К к	Қ қ	Л л	М м	Н н	Ң ң	О о
Ө ө	П п	Р р	С с	Т т	У у	Ү ү
Ф ф	Х х	Һ һ	Ц ц	Ч ч	Ҷ ҷ	Ш ш
Щ щ	ъ	Ы ы	ь	Э э	Ю ю	Я я

Tofa has letters that are not present in the Russian alphabet: Ғғ [ɣ], Әә [æ], Ii [ĭ], Ққ [q], Ңң [ŋ], Өө [œ], Үү [y], Һһ [h], and Ҷҷ [d͡ʒ]. Additionally, the letter ъ is sometimes used after a vowel to mark pharyngealization [ˤ], as in эът [ʔɛˤt̪] "meat".

An earlier version of the alphabet from 1988 looks like this:

А а	Б б	В в	Г г	Ғ ғ	Д д	Е е	Ә ә
Ё ё	Ж ж	З з	И и	I i	Й й	К к	Қ қ
Л л	М м	Н н	Ң ң	О о	Ө ө	П п	Р р
С с	Т т	У у	Ү ү	Ф ф	Х х	Һ һ	Ц ц
Ч ч	Ӌ ӌ	Ш ш	Щ щ	Ъ ъ	Ы ы	Ь ь	Э э
Ю ю	Я я

== Morphology and syntax ==
Tofa is an agglutinative language with a few auxiliary verbs. The bare stem of a verb is only used in the singular imperative; other categories are marked by suffixation, including the singular imperative negative. The Tofa suffix /--sig/ is an especially unusual derivational suffix in that it attaches to any noun to add the meaning 'smelling of + [NOUN]' or 'smelling like + [NOUN]'. Grammatical number in Tofa includes singular, plural, dual inclusive ('you and me'), and plural inclusive, tense includes the present and past, and aspect includes the perfective and imperfective. Historically suffixes conformed to Tofa vowel harmony rules, but that appears to be changing. Some example sentences are included below to illustrate suffixation:

Rounding harmony in roots	Gloss	Rounding harmony in suffixes	Gloss
[oruk]	'road'	gøk-tyɣ	grass-ADJ
[tyŋgyr]	'drum'	tyŋgyr-lyɣ	drum-ADJ
[kuduruk]	'wolf'	kuduruk-tuɣ	wolf-ADJ (literally tail-ADJ)

Plural Perfective

orus[t]e-y ber-gen
Russian[ize]-CVB ASP-PST
'They have become Russian[ized]'

Singular Imperative

nersa-ɣa bar
Nerxa-DAT go
'go to Nerxa'

Singular Imperative Negative

al-gan men di-ve
take-PST 1 say-NEG
'don't say "I took"!'

=== Pronouns ===
Tofa has six personal pronouns:

Personal pronouns
	Singular	Plural
1st person	мен men I	биъс bìs we
2nd person	сен sen you (singular)	сілер siler you (plural, formal)
3rd person	оң oŋ he/she/it	оларың olarıŋ they

Tofa also has the pronouns бо 'this', тээ 'that', кум 'who', and чү 'what'.

== Vocabulary ==
Tofa words are very similar to many other Turkic Languages, but not more than Tuvan. English and Russian are provided for reference.

Tofalar	Tuvan	Russian	English
Àt	Àt	Koň	Horse
Sők	Sők	Kosť	Bone
Bós	Bóstá	Gorlo	Throat
Dañ Àtarı	Dañ Xayázı	Rassvet	Dawn
Hartığa	Xartığa	Sokol	Falcon
