= 2024 Altai head election =

Russian local election

- 6–8 September 2024
- Turnout: 45.65%
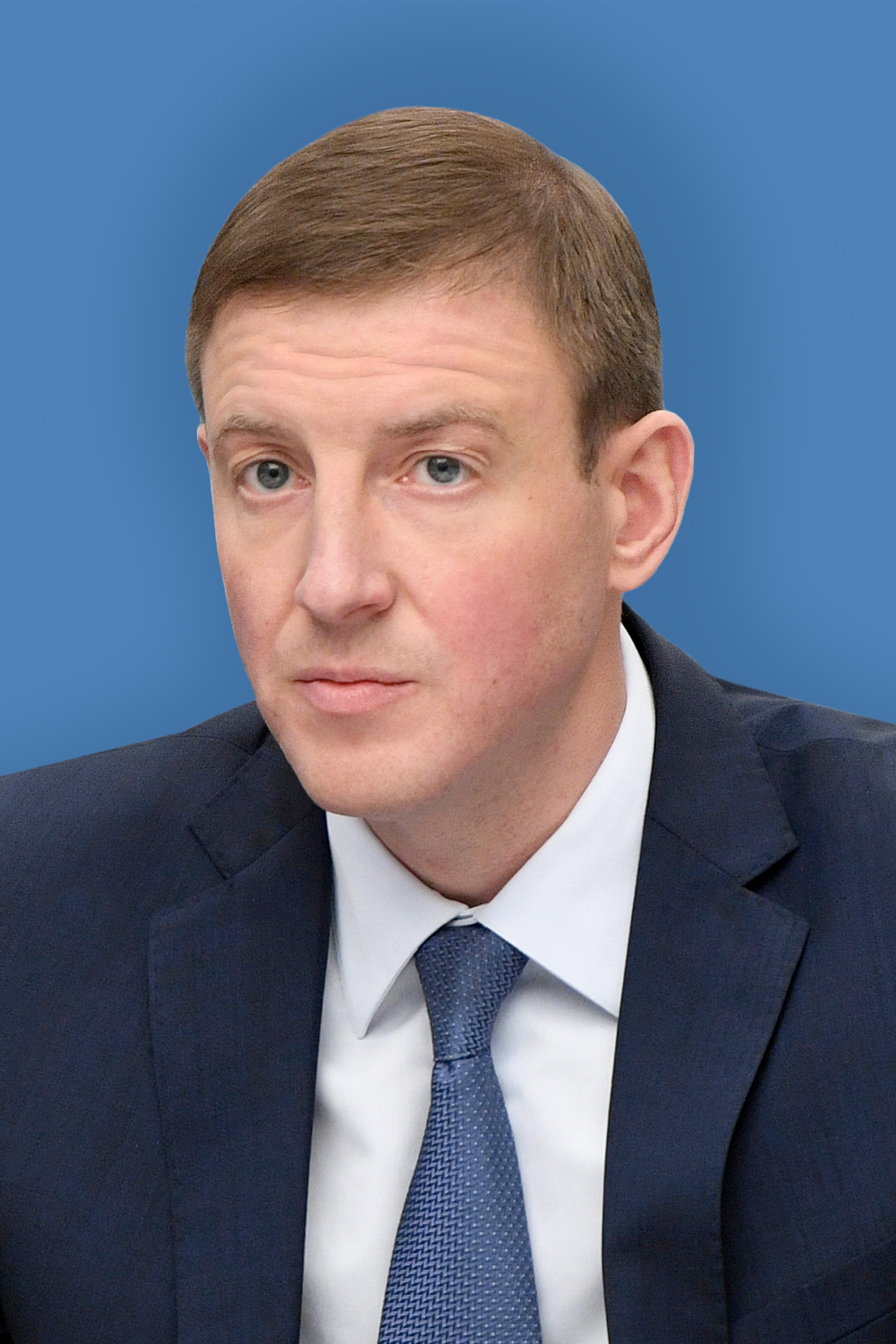
		LDPR	Rodina
Candidate	Andrey Turchak	Aleksandr Kirillov	Oleg Dobrynin
Party	United Russia	LDPR	Rodina
Popular vote	55,507	7,506	4,724
Percentage	74.09%	10.02%	6.31%
- Results by raions and cities
Head before election
Andrey Turchak (acting)
United Russia
Head-elect
Andrey Turchak
United Russia

The 2024 Altai Republic head election took place on 6–8 September 2024, on common election day, coinciding with 2024 Altai Republic State Assembly election. Acting Head Andrey Turchak was elected to a full term in office.

== Background ==
Oleg Khorokhordin, then-Federal Government Apparatus staffer and GLONASS board chairman, was appointed acting Head of the Altai Republic in March 2019. Khorokhordin replaced three-term incumbent Alexander Berdnikov, who resigned at his own request and was later appointed Rosgeologia executive.

Khorokhordin, officially an independent, was nominated for a full term by United Russia. The 2019 election was regarded as highly competitive with some experts viewed the possibility of a second round. Khorokhordin won the election with 58.82% of the vote in the second closest election of the cycle (the margin, however, was still overwhelming), defeating former State Duma member Viktor Romashkin (CPRF) by 27 points.

Poor management and public conflicts with local Altai elite led to speculations about Khorokhordin's potential retirement, which further intensified in early June 2024. Unexpectedly rumours had surfaced about the potential appointment of First Deputy Chairman of the Federation Council and Secretary General of United Russia party Andrey Turchak as acting Head of the republic, which was viewed likely as a demotion. On June 4 Khorokhordin announced his resignation and President of Russia Vladimir Putin during a video conference with Turchak offered him a position as acting Head of the Altai Republic, which Turchak accepted. Andrey Turchak previously served as Governor of Pskov Oblast in 2009–2017.

== Candidates ==
In the Altai Republic candidates for Head can be nominated only by registered political parties. Candidate for Head of the Altai Republic should be a Russian citizen and at least 30 years old. Candidates for Head should not have a foreign citizenship or residence permit. Each candidate in order to be registered is required to collect at least 7% of signatures of members and heads of municipalities. Also head candidates present 3 candidacies to the Federation Council and election winner later appoints one of the presented candidates.

=== Declared ===
Candidate name, political party		Occupation	Status	Ref.
Oleg Dobrynin; Rodina		Member of State Assembly of the Altai Republic (2019–present)	Registered	
Aleksandr Kirillov; Liberal Democratic Party		Former Member of State Assembly of the Altai Republic (2006–2014); Sports instructor	Registered	
Andrey Turchak; United Russia	Andrey Turchak	Acting Head of the Altai Republic (2024–present); Former Secretary General of United Russia party (2017–2024); Former First Deputy Chairman of the Federation Council (2020–2024)	Registered	
Aleksandr Klimov; Cossack Party		Businessman	Failed to qualify	
Vladimir Kosov; Green Alternative		Security shooter	Failed to qualify	
Pyotr Bukach; Communist Party		Member of State Assembly of the Altai Republic (2019–present); Businessman	Did not file	
Sergey Kukhtuyekov; Civic Initiative		Member of State Assembly of the Altai Republic (2019–present); Businessman	Did not file	
Vasily Tolmachev; Civilian Power		Prison driver	Withdrew	

=== Eliminated at convention ===
- Tatyana Gigel (United Russia), Senator from Altai Republic (2014–present)
- Aydar Myzin (United Russia), Member of State Assembly of the Altai Republic (2019–present)

=== Declined ===
- Viktor Romashkin (CPRF), Member of State Assembly of the Altai Republic (1993–1995, 2006–present), former Member of State Duma (1995–1999), 1997, 2001, 2014 and 2019 gubernatorial candidate

=== Candidates for Federation Council ===
Incumbent Senator Vladimir Poletaev (United Russia) was not renominated.

Head candidate, political party	Candidates for Federation Council	Status
Andrey Turchak; United Russia	* Amyr Argamakov, Russian intervention in the Syrian Civil War and invasion of Ukraine veteran, Hero of the Russian Federation * Tatyana Gigel, incumbent Senator from the State Assembly of the Altai Republic (2014–present) * Ezher Malchinov, Chairman of the Altai Krai Chamber of Control and Account (2019–present)	Nominated

== Finances ==
All sums are in rubles.

Financial Report	Source	Bukach	Dobrynin	Kirillov	Klimov	Kosov	Kukhtuyekov	Turchak
First		60,000	150,000	170,000	130,000	20,000	25,000	13,310,000
Final		60,000	800,000	906,125	130,000	20,000	25,000	27,155,000

== Results ==
Summary of the 6–8 September 2024 Altai head election results
Candidate	Party	Votes	%
Andrey Turchak (incumbent)	United Russia	55,507	74.09
Aleksandr Kirillov	Liberal Democratic Party	7,506	10.02
Oleg Dobrynin	Rodina	4,724	6.31
Valid votes		67,737	90.41
Blank ballots		7,186	9.59
Total		74,924	100.00
Turnout		74,924	45.65
Registered voters		164,122	100.00

Head Turchak appointed Hero of the Russian Federation Amyr Argamakov (Independent) to the Federation Council, replacing incumbent Senator Vladimir Poletaev (United Russia).

== See also ==
- 2024 Russian regional elections
