= 2024 Altai Republic State Assembly election =

Regional election in Russia

← 2019	6–8 September 2024	2029 →

All 41 seats in the State Assembly 21 seats needed for a majority
- Turnout: 45.61% ▼4.26 pp
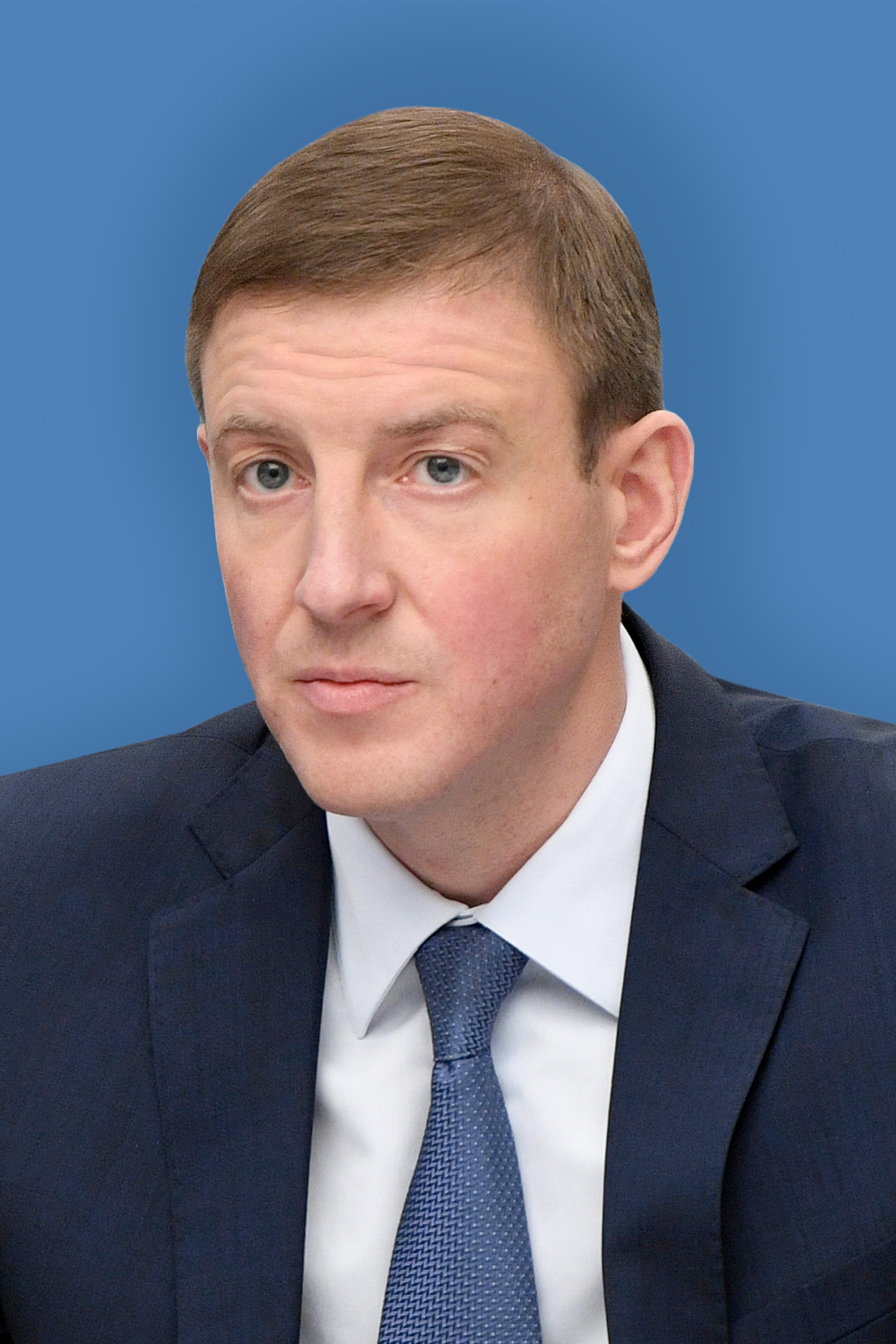

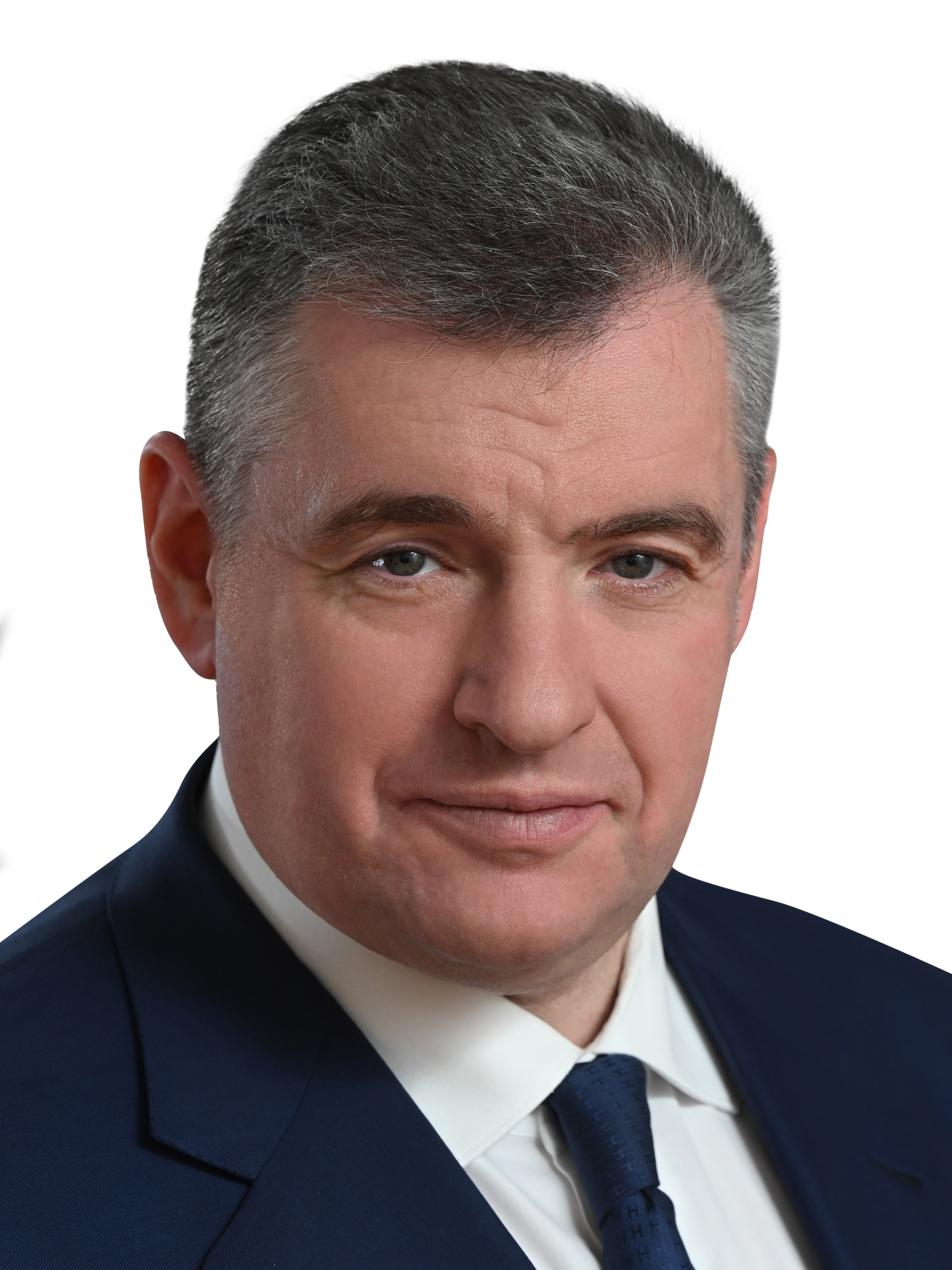
	Majority party	Minority party	Third party
			CPRF
Candidate	Andrey Turchak	Leonid Slutsky	Viktor Romashkin
Party	United Russia	LDPR	CPRF
Last election	34.18%, 25 seats	12.03%, 1 seat	29.50%, 7 seats
Seats won	37	2	1
Seat change	▲12	▲1	▼6
Popular vote	40,293	13,595	10,201
Percentage	53.84%	18.17%	13.63%
Swing	▲19.66 pp	▲6.14 pp	▼15.87 pp
	Fourth party	Fifth party	Sixth party
	SR-ZP	NL	Rodina
Candidate	Aleksandr Gruzdev	Konstantin Vasilenko	Oleg Dobrynin
Party	SR-ZP	New People	Rodina
Last election	5.31%, 1 seat	Did not exist	5.38%, 1 seat
Seats won	1	0	0
Seat change	Steady	Did not exist	▼1
Popular vote	4,268	2,672	1,237
Percentage	5.70%	3.57%	1.65%
Swing	▲0.39 pp	Did not exist	▼3.73 pp
Chairman before election
Artur Kokhoyev
United Russia
Elected Chairman
Ezher Yalbakov
United Russia

The 2024 State Assembly of the Altai Republic election took place on 6–8 September 2024, on common election day, coinciding with 2024 Altai head election. All 41 seats in the State Assembly were up for re-election.

United Russia retained its overwhelming majority in the State Assembly, winning 54% of the vote and all 30 single-mandate constituencies. Liberal Democratic Party of Russia recorded gains after its alliance with local Party of Business and came second with 18%, while Communist Party of the Russian Federation suffered a crushing defeat (14%), losing six of its seven seats. Rodina failed to cross the threshold and lost its only seat.

== Electoral system ==
Under current election laws, the State Assembly is elected for a term of five years, with parallel voting. 11 seats are elected by party-list proportional representation with a 5% electoral threshold, with the other half elected in 30 single-member constituencies by first-past-the-post voting. Seats in the proportional part are allocated using the Imperiali quota, modified to ensure that every party list, which passes the threshold, receives at least one mandate.

== Candidates ==
=== Party lists ===
To register regional lists of candidates, parties need to collect 0.5% of signatures of all registered voters in the Altai Republic.

The following parties were relieved from the necessity to collect signatures:

- United Russia
- Communist Party of the Russian Federation
- A Just Russia — Patriots — For Truth
- Liberal Democratic Party of Russia
- New People
- Rodina
- Russian Party of Pensioners for Social Justice

№	Party	Republic-wide list	Candidates	Territorial groups	Status
	Communist Party	Viktor Romashkin • Mikhail Fedkin • Arzhan Bakrasov	29	10	Registered
	Liberal Democratic Party	Leonid Slutsky • Dmitry Sofronov • Roman Rekhtin	33	10	Registered
	New People	Konstantin Vasilenko • Glafira Imamadiyeva	21	8	Registered
	United Russia	Andrey Turchak • Artur Kokhoyev • Alyona Kazantseva	32	10	Registered
	Rodina	Oleg Dobrynin • Aleksandr Vakulenko • Vyacheslav Batrakov	23	10	Registered
	A Just Russia – For Truth	Aleksandr Gruzdev	17	8	Registered

New People took part in Altai legislative election for the first time. Russian Party of Pensioners for Social Justice, Russian Party of Freedom and Justice and Yabloko, who participated in the last election, did not file, while Patriots of Russia merged with A Just Russia in 2021.

=== Single-mandate constituencies ===
30 single-mandate constituencies were formed in the Altai Republic. To register candidates in single-mandate constituencies need to collect 3% of signatures of registered voters in the constituency.

Number of candidates in single-mandate constituencies
Party	Candidates	
Party	Nominated	Registered
United Russia	30	30
Communist Party	21	21
Liberal Democratic Party	23	21
Rodina	30	30
A Just Russia – For Truth	7	7
Party of Russia's Rebirth	–	–
Independent	20	1
Total	131	110

== Results ==
=== Results by party lists ===
Summary of the 6–8 September 2024 State Assembly of the Altai Republic election results
Party	Party list					Constituency		Total	
Party	Votes	%	±pp	Seats	+/–	Seats	+/–	Seats	+/–
United Russia	40,293	53.84	▲19.66	7	▲3	30	▲9	37	▲12
Liberal Democratic Party	13,595	18.17	▲6.14	2	▲1	0	Steady	2	▲1
Communist Party	10,201	13.63	▼15.87	1	▼3	0	▼3	1	▼6
A Just Russia — For Truth	4,268	5.70	▲0.39	1	Steady	0	Steady	1	1
New People	2,672	3.57	New	0	New	–	–	0	New
Rodina	1,237	1.65	▼3.73	0	▼1	0	Steady	0	▼1
Independents	–	–	–	–	–	0	▼5	0	▼5
Invalid ballots	2,568	3.43	▼0.73	—	—	—	—	—	—
Total	74,834	100.00	—	11	Steady	30	Steady	41	Steady
Turnout	74,834	45.61	▼4.26	—	—	—	—	—	—
Registered voters	164,086	100.00	—	—	—	—	—	—	—

Former First Deputy Chairman of the Government of the Altai Republic Ezher Yalbakov (United Russia) was elected as Chairman of the State Assembly, replacing Artur Kokhoyev (United Russia), who was appointed to the Federation Council instead of incumbent Senator Tatyana Gigel (United Russia). Gigel, in turn, was elected Deputy Chairwoman of the State Assembly and leader of United Russia faction.

=== Results in single-member constituencies ===
==== District 1 ====
Summary of the 6–8 September 2024 State Assembly of the Altai Republic election in District 1
Candidate	Party	Votes	%
Sergey Timoshensky	United Russia	1,311	53.80%
Roman Rekhtin	Liberal Democratic Party	614	25.19%
Pyotr Bukach (incumbent)	Communist Party	325	13.34%
Alyona Amosova	Rodina	134	5.50%
Total		2,437	100%

==== District 2 ====
Summary of the 6–8 September 2024 State Assembly of the Altai Republic election in District 2
Candidate	Party	Votes	%
Artur Kokhoyev (incumbent)	United Russia	1,619	67.18%
Natalya Sofronova	Liberal Democratic Party	384	15.93%
Vyacheslav Kharin	Communist Party	219	9.09%
Olga Shcherbakova	Rodina	144	5.98%
Total		2,410	100%

==== District 3 ====
Summary of the 6–8 September 2024 State Assembly of the Altai Republic election in District 3
Candidate	Party	Votes	%
Radmila Pekpeyeva (incumbent)	United Russia	1,236	58.14%
Mikhail Paklin	Communist Party	514	24.18%
Yevgeny Shutov	Liberal Democratic Party	214	10.07%
Valery Konovalov	Rodina	108	5.08%
Total		2,126	100%

==== District 4 ====
Summary of the 6–8 September 2024 State Assembly of the Altai Republic election in District 4
Candidate	Party	Votes	%
Konstantin Krivoruchenko	United Russia	982	43.37%
Askar Tulebayev (incumbent)	Communist Party	869	38.38%
Mikhail Yaskov	A Just Russia — For Truth	280	12.37%
Leyla Zeynalova	Rodina	80	3.53%
Total		2,264	100%

==== District 5 ====
Summary of the 6–8 September 2024 State Assembly of the Altai Republic election in District 5
Candidate	Party	Votes	%
German Chepkin (incumbent)	United Russia	1,216	62.01%
Aleksey Tadykin	Liberal Democratic Party	306	15.60%
Igor Tumashov	Communist Party	214	10.91%
Viktor Tabayev	Rodina	161	8.21%
Total		1,961	100%

==== District 6 ====
Summary of the 6–8 September 2024 State Assembly of the Altai Republic election in District 6
Candidate	Party	Votes	%
Pyotr Poposhev (incumbent)	United Russia	1,304	71.02%
Svetlana Kazantseva	Liberal Democratic Party	403	21.95%
Yevgeny Buzayev	Rodina	65	3.54%
Total		1,836	100%

==== District 7 ====
Summary of the 6–8 September 2024 State Assembly of the Altai Republic election in District 7
Candidate	Party	Votes	%
Nikolay Kim	United Russia	1,426	63.89%
Maria Demina (incumbent)	Liberal Democratic Party	561	25.13%
Marina Demina	Rodina	154	6.90%
Total		2,232	100%

==== District 8 ====
Summary of the 6–8 September 2024 State Assembly of the Altai Republic election in District 8
Candidate	Party	Votes	%
Roman Gordeyev	United Russia	1,551	75.73%
Lyudmila Karnushina	Rodina	402	19.63%
Total		2,048	100%

==== District 9 ====
Summary of the 6–8 September 2024 State Assembly of the Altai Republic election in District 9
Candidate	Party	Votes	%
Ezen Syuyleshev (incumbent)	United Russia	1,602	64.62%
Ayganat Beysembinova	Liberal Democratic Party	525	21.18%
Suuner Badarchinov	Rodina	231	9.32%
Total		2,479	100%

==== District 10 ====
Summary of the 6–8 September 2024 State Assembly of the Altai Republic election in District 10
Candidate	Party	Votes	%
Erzhanat Begenov (incumbent)	United Russia	1,668	66.72%
Dalaykan Zeynoldanov	Communist Party	457	18.28%
Arina Sindinova	Rodina	304	12.16%
Total		2,500	100%

==== District 11 ====
Summary of the 6–8 September 2024 State Assembly of the Altai Republic election in District 11
Candidate	Party	Votes	%
Samat Kagarmanov (incumbent)	United Russia	1,398	76.69%
Aygul Kustubayeva	Rodina	314	17.22%
Total		1,823	100%

==== District 12 ====
Summary of the 6–8 September 2024 State Assembly of the Altai Republic election in District 12
Candidate	Party	Votes	%
Dmitry Sumachakov	United Russia	1,685	58.65%
Temirbek Kuskov	A Just Russia — For Truth	830	28.89%
Anastasia Panina	Communist Party	209	7.27%
Kristina Samsonova	Rodina	78	2.71%
Total		2,873	100%

==== District 13 ====
Summary of the 6–8 September 2024 State Assembly of the Altai Republic election in District 13
Candidate	Party	Votes	%
Mikhail Konovalov (incumbent)	United Russia	1,343	66.88%
Vitaly Fokin	Communist Party	258	12.85%
Maksim Sofronov	Liberal Democratic Party	232	11.55%
Yulia Solovyeva	Rodina	116	5.78%
Total		2,008	100%

==== District 14 ====
Summary of the 6–8 September 2024 State Assembly of the Altai Republic election in District 14
Candidate	Party	Votes	%
Alyona Kazantseva (incumbent)	United Russia	1,431	60.03%
Dmitry Sofronov	Liberal Democratic Party	489	20.51%
Olesya Gayeva	Communist Party	325	13.63%
Stepan Okhotnikov	Rodina	91	3.82%
Total		2,384	100%

==== District 15 ====
Summary of the 6–8 September 2024 State Assembly of the Altai Republic election in District 15
Candidate	Party	Votes	%
Olga Volosovtseva (incumbent)	United Russia	1,174	45.17%
Valentina Lavinishnikova	Liberal Democratic Party	809	31.13%
Natalya Kolesnikova	Communist Party	236	9.08%
Yevgeny Askanakov	A Just Russia — For Truth	211	8.12%
Arina Chalyk-Bespalova	Rodina	45	1.73%
Total		2,599	100%

==== District 16 ====
Summary of the 6–8 September 2024 State Assembly of the Altai Republic election in District 16
Candidate	Party	Votes	%
Rashid Atazhanov (incumbent)	United Russia	1,071	50.35%
Dmitry Korolyov	Liberal Democratic Party	650	30.56%
Alan Kokhoyev	Communist Party	295	13.87%
Aleksandr Polyansky	Rodina	43	2.02%
Total		2,127	100%

==== District 17 ====
Summary of the 6–8 September 2024 State Assembly of the Altai Republic election in District 17
Candidate	Party	Votes	%
Rustam Baydalakov (incumbent)	United Russia	1,869	67.23%
Anatoly Kinov	Communist Party	364	13.09%
Polina Berezentseva	Liberal Democratic Party	350	12.59%
Maksim Trykov	Rodina	100	3.60%
Total		2,780	100%

==== District 18 ====
Summary of the 6–8 September 2024 State Assembly of the Altai Republic election in District 18
Candidate	Party	Votes	%
Atkyr Amyyev (incumbent)	United Russia	1,673	54.66%
Arzhan Takin	Rodina	721	23.55%
Anatoly Surazov	Communist Party	471	15.39%
Total		3,061	100%

==== District 19 ====
Summary of the 6–8 September 2024 State Assembly of the Altai Republic election in District 19
Candidate	Party	Votes	%
Vladislav Ryabchenko (incumbent)	United Russia	1,732	60.96%
Yelena Tsuprikova	Communist Party	545	19.18%
Dmitry Zyablitsky	Liberal Democratic Party	319	11.23%
Dmitry Zyablitsky	Rodina	100	3.52%
Total		2,841	100%

==== District 20 ====
Summary of the 6–8 September 2024 State Assembly of the Altai Republic election in District 20
Candidate	Party	Votes	%
Ikhtiyor Mardiyev	United Russia	982	48.59%
Aleksandr Ponomarev	Communist Party	652	32.26%
Larisa Zenkova	A Just Russia — For Truth	189	9.35%
Ivan Sharovatov	Rodina	133	6.58%
Total		2,021	100%

==== District 21 ====
Summary of the 6–8 September 2024 State Assembly of the Altai Republic election in District 21
Candidate	Party	Votes	%
Aleksey Yebechekov	United Russia	1,491	58.38%
Aset Zargumarov (incumbent)	A Just Russia — For Truth	886	34.69%
Yury Orekhov	Liberal Democratic Party	67	2.62%
Aleksandr Zagursky	Rodina	38	1.49%
Total		2,021	100%

==== District 22 ====
Summary of the 6–8 September 2024 State Assembly of the Altai Republic election in District 22
Candidate	Party	Votes	%
Aydar Tazrashev (incumbent)	United Russia	1,279	51.68%
Ayana Temeyeva	Liberal Democratic Party	1,043	42.14%
Erkeley Alchinova	Rodina	68	2.75%
Total		2,475	100%

==== District 23 ====
Summary of the 6–8 September 2024 State Assembly of the Altai Republic election in District 23
Candidate	Party	Votes	%
Valery Toyedov	United Russia	1,441	48.02%
Yury Manyshev	Independent	597	19.89%
Arzhan Bakrasov	Communist Party	369	12.30%
Viktor Bakhramayev	A Just Russia — For Truth	286	9.53%
Svetlana Chabachakova	Liberal Democratic Party	179	5.96%
Temirey Tain	Rodina	34	1.13%
Total		3,001	100%

==== District 24 ====
Summary of the 6–8 September 2024 State Assembly of the Altai Republic election in District 24
Candidate	Party	Votes	%
Ay-Sulu Yabyyeva (incumbent)	United Russia	1,917	72.56%
Ayabas Yagrashev	Rodina	590	22.33%
Total		2,642	100%

==== District 25 ====
Summary of the 6–8 September 2024 State Assembly of the Altai Republic election in District 25
Candidate	Party	Votes	%
Natalya Lukyanova	United Russia	1,866	59.20%
Liliana Irtysheva	Liberal Democratic Party	1,012	32.11%
Ruslana Shikakova	Rodina	216	6.85%
Total		3,152	100%

==== District 26 ====
Summary of the 6–8 September 2024 State Assembly of the Altai Republic election in District 26
Candidate	Party	Votes	%
Tamara Shadrina	United Russia	1,512	49.01%
Svetlana Maymanova	Liberal Democratic Party	1,055	34.20%
Sergey Kolmakov	Communist Party	377	12.22%
Olesya Formanskaya	Rodina	63	2.04%
Total		3,085	100%

==== District 27 ====
Summary of the 6–8 September 2024 State Assembly of the Altai Republic election in District 27
Candidate	Party	Votes	%
Aleksey Lobanov	United Russia	1,396	66.13%
Aleksandr Kozulin	Communist Party	421	19.94%
Pavel Glebov	Liberal Democratic Party	185	8.76%
Denis Tikhonov	Rodina	50	2.37%
Total		2,111	100%

==== District 28 ====
Summary of the 6–8 September 2024 State Assembly of the Altai Republic election in District 28
Candidate	Party	Votes	%
Mikhail Terekhov (incumbent)	United Russia	1,623	49.02%
Yevgeny Shtanov	Liberal Democratic Party	865	26.13%
Yuliana Slabko	Communist Party	538	16.25%
Semyon Shmatov	Rodina	120	3.62%
Total		3,311	100%

==== District 29 ====
Summary of the 6–8 September 2024 State Assembly of the Altai Republic election in District 29
Candidate	Party	Votes	%
Sergey Mazalov (incumbent)	United Russia	1,477	56.42%
Yevgeny Kanshin	A Just Russia — For Truth	831	31.74%
Irina Kuznetsova	Communist Party	173	6.61%
Ivan Serkin	Rodina	66	2.52%
Total		2,618	100%

==== District 30 ====
Summary of the 6–8 September 2024 State Assembly of the Altai Republic election in District 30
Candidate	Party	Votes	%
Natalya Yekeyeva (incumbent)	United Russia	1,232	48.39%
Andrey Karasev	Liberal Democratic Party	766	30.09%
Sofya Biritsevskaya	Communist Party	283	11.12%
Arzhana Manzyrova	Rodina	194	7.62%
Total		2,546	100%

=== Members ===
Incumbent deputies are highlighted with bold, elected members who declined to take a seat are marked with ~~strikethrough~~.

Constituency
No.	Member	Party
1	Sergey Timoshensky	United Russia
2	Artur Kokhoyev	United Russia
3	Radmila Pekpeyeva	United Russia
4	Konstantin Krivoruchenko	United Russia
5	German Chepkin	United Russia
6	Pyotr Poposhev	United Russia
7	Nikolay Kim	United Russia
8	Roman Gordeyev	United Russia
9	Ezen Syuyleshev	United Russia
10	Erzhanat Begenov	United Russia
11	Samat Kagarmanov	United Russia
12	Dmitry Sumachakov	United Russia
13	Mikhail Konovalov	United Russia
14	Alyona Kazantseva	United Russia
15	Olga Volosovtseva	United Russia
16	Rashid Atazhanov	United Russia
17	Rustam Baydalakov	United Russia
18	Atkyr Amyyev	United Russia
19	Vladislav Ryabchenko	United Russia
20	Ikhtiyor Mardiyev	United Russia
21	Aleksey Yebechekov	United Russia
22	Aydar Tazrashev	United Russia
23	Valery Toyedov	United Russia
24	Ay-Sulu Yabyyeva	United Russia
25	Natalya Lukyanova	United Russia
26	Tamara Shadrina	United Russia
27	Aleksey Lobanov	United Russia
28	Mikhail Terekhov	United Russia
29	Sergey Mazalov	United Russia
30	Natalya Yekeyeva	United Russia

Party lists
Member	Party
~~Andrey Turchak~~	United Russia
~~Ezher Malchinov~~	United Russia
Yelena Basargina	United Russia
~~Andrey Pivovarov~~	United Russia
~~Archynay Kundyusheva~~	United Russia
~~Ivan Perevalov~~	United Russia
~~Yury Nechayev~~	United Russia
Aleksandr Kryuchkin	United Russia
Gariy Telesov	United Russia
~~Pyotr Gromov~~	United Russia
Maksim Anisimov	United Russia
Tatyana Gigel	United Russia
Ezher Yalbakov	United Russia
~~Mergen Chichkanov~~	United Russia
Aleksandr Kazachenko	United Russia
~~Leonid Slutsky~~	Liberal Democratic Party
Dmitry Sofronov	Liberal Democratic Party
Roman Rekhtin	Liberal Democratic Party
Viktor Romashkin	Communist Party
Aleksandr Gruzdev	A Just Russia – For Truth

== See also ==
- 2024 Russian elections
