= Korsak (disambiguation) =

Korsak is a surname.

Korsak may also refer to:

- Korsak coat of arms
- KMO-9 "Korsak" machine pistol, variant of PP-91 Kedr

== See also ==
- Corsac
