= Korsakov (surname) =

Korsakov, Korsakoff (Russian: Ко́рсаков), or Korsakova (feminine; Ко́рсакова), is a Russian surname. It is a patronymic derivation from the nickname Korsak. Notable people with the surname include:

- Alexander Dondukov-Korsakov (1820–1893), Russian knyaz, cavalry general, Imperial Commissioner in Bulgaria
- Andrey Korsakov (1916–2007), Russian and Ukrainian linguist and language philosopher
- Alexander Rimsky-Korsakov (1753–1840), Russian infantry general
- Andrey Rimsky-Korsakov (1878–1940), Russian musicologist, son of the composer Nikolai Rimsky-Korsakov
- Dmitry Korsakov (1843–1920), Russian historian
- Nadezhda Rimskaya-Korsakova (1848–1919), Russian pianist and composer
- Nikolai Rimsky-Korsakov (1844–1908), Russian composer
- Pyotr Korsakov (1790–1844), Russian writer
- Semyon Korsakov (1788–1853), Russian homeopath and inventor
- Sergei Korsakoff (1854–1900), Russian neuropsychiatrist
  - Korsakoff's syndrome, a brain disease caused by chronic alcoholism named after Sergei Korsakoff
- Vera Korsakova (hurdler) (born 1941), Kyrgyzstani hurdler
- Vera Korsakova (politician) (1920–2022), Soviet-Russian politician
- The Korsakov family, who owned the building that now occupies the Lensovet Theatre in Saint Petersburg, in the early 20th century. The last heir was Sofya Alekseevna Korsakova, who married a prince of the House of Golitsyn.
