= List of theatres in Saint Petersburg =

Saint Petersburg, Russia is home to more than a hundred theatres and theatre companies. This list includes theatre companies that regularly produce plays and buildings used for theatrical performances.

The first permanent professional public theatre in Russia, the "Russian Theatre for the Performance of Tragedies and Comedies" (Русский для представления трагедий и комедий театр) was established in St. Petersburg in 1756 by order of Empress Elizabeth. In 1785 the Hermitage Theatre was opened in the Hermitage palace complex. This is the oldest theatre building in St. Petersburg that has been preserved in its original form.

== Dramatic theatres ==
Name	Address	Opening date	Artistic direction	Picture
Tovstonogov Bolshoi Drama Theatre (Большой Драматический Театр имени Г. А. Товстоногова)	Fontanka River Embankment, 65	1919	Artistic director: Andrey Moguchij	
Kamenny Island Theatre (Каменноостровский театр, (small stage of the Bolshoi Drama Theatre)	Krestovka River Embankment, 10 А	2011	Artistic director: Andrey Moguchij	
Alexandrinsky Theatre (Российский государственный академический театр драмы им. А.С. Пушкина [Александринский театр])	Ostrovsky Square, 6	1756	Artistic director: Valery Fokin	
Komissarzhevsky Theatre (Академический драматический театр имени В. Ф. Комиссаржевской)	Italian Street, 19	1901	Artistic director: Viktor Novikov	
Lensovet Theatre (Санкт-Петербургский академический театр имени Ленсовета)	Vladimirsky Prospekt, 12	1929	Principal director: Larisa Luppian	
Saint Petersburg Comedy Theatre (Санкт-Петербургский академический театр комедии им. Н. П. Акимова)	Nevsky Prospekt, 56	1929	Artistic director: Tatyana Kazakova	
Youth Theatre on the Fontanka (Санкт-Петербургский государственный молодёжный театр на Фонтанке)	Fontanka River Embankment, 114	1974	Artistic director: Semyon Spivak	
Baltic House Festival Theatre (Театр-фестиваль "Балтийский дом")	Alexandrovsky Park, 4	1936	Principal director: Vladimir Tykke	
Subbota Theatre (Saint Petersburg) (Театр "Суббота")	Zvenigorodskaya str., 30	1969	Principal director: Andrey Sidelnikov	
Fyodor Mikhaylovich Dostoyevsky Theatre (FMD Theatre, ФМД-Театр)	Kuznechny Lane, 5/2			
Bely Theatre (Белый театр)	Kuznechny Lane, 5/2	1995	Artistic director: Mikhail Chavchavadze	
Takoy Theatre (lit. "such a theatre", Такой театр)	Кузнечный переулок, 5/2	2002	Artistic director: Aleksandr Bargman	
Yuventa Theatre (Театр "Ювента")	On the stage of the AleKo Theatre; Yury Gagarin Street, 42	2002	Artistic director: Viktor Nikolayev	
State Dramatic Theatre on Liteyny (Государственный драматический Театр "На Литейном")	Liteyny Avenue, 51	1909	Artistic director: Aleksandr Getman	
Dramatic Theatre of the Baltic Fleet (Драматический театр Балтийского флота)	Kronshtadt, Makarovskaya Street, 3	1930	Artistic director: Yu. K. Nikolayev	
St. Petersburg Theatre Across the Chyornaya River (Санкт-Петербургский театр "За Чёрной речкой"	Bogatyrsky Avenue, 4	1983	Principal director: Oleg Mendelson	
Государственный драматический театр "Комедианты"	Лиговский проспект, 44	1989	Artistic director: Михаил Левшин	
Санкт-Петербургский государственный детский драматический театр "На Неве"	Советский переулок, 5	1987	Artistic director: Заслуженный деятель искусства России Татьяна Савенкова	
Театр "Особняк"	Каменноостровский проспект, 55	1989	Artistic director-Director: Алексей Слюсарчук	
Санкт-Петербургский драматический театр "Остров"	Каменноостровский проспект, 26–28	1990	Artistic director: Заслуженный деятель искусств России Александр Болонин	
Государственный драматический театр "Приют Комедианта"	Садовая улица, 27/9	1987	Директор-Artistic director: Виктор Минков	
Формальный театр Андрея Могучего		1989	Director: Андрей Могучий	
Санкт-петербургский интерьерный театр	Невский проспект, 104	1976	Artistic director-директор: Николай Беляк	
Камерный театр Владимира Малыщицкого	улица Восстания, 41	1987		
Театр Дождей	набережная реки Фонтанки, 130	1990	Artistic director: Наталья Никитина	
Театр "Домино", Театр "Львёнок"	Васильевский остров, Большой проспект, 83		Director: Лилия Саяпина	
Театр поколений	Петроградская сторона, Лахтинская улица, 25 А	1991	Artistic director: Данила Корогодский	
Наш театр	на сцене Театра Эстрады им. А.Райкина, Большая Конюшенная улица, 27	2000	Artistic director: Лев Стукалов	
Театр драматических импровизаций	проспект Стачек, 72	1989	Principal director: Павел Подервянский	
Maly Drama Theatre – Theatre of Europe(Академический малый драматический театр – Театр Европы)	улица Рубинштейна, 18	1944	Lev Dodin (Лев Додин)	
Санкт-Петербургский театр "Русская антреприза" имени Андрея Миронова	Петроградская сторона, Большой проспект, 75/35	1988	Директор – Artistic director: Рудольф Фурманов, главный режиссер: Влад Фурман	
Санкт-Петербургский детский драматический "Театр У Нарвских ворот"	улица Зои Космодемьянской, 3	1990	Artistic director: Валентина Лутц	
Театр юных зрителей имени А.А.Брянцева	Пионерская площадь, 1	1922	Руководитель художественных проектов: Адольф Шапиро, главный режиссер: Арсений Сагальчик	
Театр юношеского творчества (ТЮТ)	Невский проспект, 39	1956	Artistic director: заслуженный работник культуры Евгений Сазонов	
Учебный театр "На Моховой"	Моховая улица, 35	1962	И.о. ректора СПбГАТИ Чепуров А.А., Исполнительный директор Тимонова Е.Н.	
Театр-студия "Небольшой Драматический Театр"	На сцене театра имени Ленсовета, Владимирский проспект, 12	1999	Artistic director: Лев Эренбург	
Санкт-Петербургский драматический театр "Алые Паруса"	На сцене музея "Разночинный Петербург", Большой Казачий переулок, 7	2001	Екатерина Лесова	
Театр на Васильевском	Васильевский остров, Средний проспект, 48	1989	Artistic director-директор: Владимир Словохотов	
Санкт-Петербургский театр "Мастерская"	Народная улица, 1	2010	Artistic director: заслуженный деятель искусств России Григорий Козлов	
Авторский театр	на Камерной сцене МДТ, улица Рубинштейна, 18	2008	Artistic director: Олег Дмитриев	
Санкт-Петербургский Православный Драматический театр "Странник"	Цветочная улица, 16	2007	Artistic director: Владимир Уваров	
Театр-студия "Пушкинская школа"	набережная реки Фонтанки, 41	1992	Artistic director: Владимир Рецептер	
Санкт-Петербургский Театр LUSORES	на сцене Театра "Особняк" Каменноостровский проспект, 55	2007	Artistic director: Александр Савчук	
Культурно-просветительский центр деятелей театра и кино "АлеКо"	проспект Юрия Гагарина, 42	2010	Artistic director: Алексей Козырев	
Театральная лаборатория под руководством Вадима Максимова		1984	Режиссер и Artistic director: Вадим Максимов	
Театро Ди Капуа	На сцене Санкт-Петербургского Мюзик-холла, Александровский парк, 4	2008	Режиссер: Джулиано ди Капуа	
Экспериментальная сцена под руководством Анатолия Праудина	На сцене театра Балтийский дом, Александровский парк, 4	1999	Artistic director: лауреат Государственной премии РФ Анатолий Праудин	
Антреприза имени Екатерины Орловой		2003	Директор-Artistic director: Геннадий Волноходец	
Санкт-Петербургский "Классический театр"		1993	Artistic director: Людмила Мартынова	
Театральная мастерская "АСБ"	на сцене Театра "Особняк" Каменноостровский проспект, 55	2000	Artistic director: Алексей Янковский	
Молодежный центр театрального и киноискусства "МИГ"	Владимирский проспект, 12	2009	Генеральный директор-руководитель проекта: Милена Авимская	
Народный театр "Глагол"	Лесной проспект, 65, к. 8	1971	Директор: заслуженный работник культуры РФ А.М. Борщевский; Artistic director: заслуженный работник культуры РФ Константин Гершов	
Петербургский "Этюд-Театр"	на сцене Режиссерской Лаборатории "ON.Театр" улица Жуковского, 17 и театра "Мастерская" Народная улица, 1	2011	Artistic director: Вениамин Михайлович Фильштинский, Principal director: Дмитрий Егоров, Директор: Данил Вачегин	

== Opera and ballet theatres ==
Name	Address	Opening date	Artistic direction	Picture
Mariinsky Theatre	Театральная площадь, 1	1783	Artistic director / director: Народный артист России Валерий Гергиев	
Концертный зал Мариинского театра	улица Декабристов, 37	2009	Artistic director / director: Народный артист России Валерий Гергиев	
Mikhailovsky Theatre	Площадь Искусств, 1	1833	Музыкальный руководитель-главный дирижёр театра: Петер Феранец, Artistic director балетной труппы: Начо Дуато	
Театр оперы и балета Санкт-Петербургской консерватории им. Н. А. Римского-Корсакова (Большой зал)	Театральная площадь, 3	1836	Artistic director: Юлия Хуторецкая	
Малый зал имени А. К. Глазунова Санкт-Петербургской консерватории им. Н. А. Римского-Корсакова	Театральная площадь, 3	1896	Начальник: Заслуженный работник культуры РФ Лидия Волчек	
Санкт-Петербургский Государственный академический театр балета имени Леонида Якобсона	дирекция улица Маяковского, 15	1966	Директор-Artistic director: Юрий Петухов	
Государственный Академический Театр Балета под руководством Бориса Эйфмана	дирекция Гагаринская улица, 32 В	1977	Artistic director: Народный артист России Борис Эйфман	
Театр детского балета	площадь Стачек, 4	1992	Artistic director: Анатолий Никифоров	
Камерный музыкальный театр "Санктъ-Петербургъ Опера"	Галерная улица, 33	1987	Народный артист России Юрий Александров	
Санкт-Петербургский Мужской балет Валерия Михайловского	Гороховая улица, 71	1992	Artistic director: Валерий Михайловский	
Театр "Крепостной балет"		2005	Хореограф: Елена Прокопьева	
Театр танца "Интеллбалет"		2000	Artistic director: Лариса Иванова	

== Musical theatres ==
Name	Address	Opening date	Artistic direction	Picture
Санкт-Петербургский Мюзик-холл	Александровский парк, 4	1966		
Театр "Рок-опера"		1989	Artistic director: Заслуженный деятель искусств РФ Владимир Подгородинский	
Санкт-Петербургский театр музыкальной комедии	Итальянская улица, 13	1929	Главный режиссер: Александр Исаков	
Санкт-Петербургский государственный музыкально-драматический театр "Буфф"	Заневский проспект, 26	1983	Artistic director: народный артист России Исаак Штокбант	
Санкт-Петербургский государственный детский музыкальный театр "Зазеркалье"	улица Рубинштейна, 13	1987	Artistic director-главный режиссер: Александр Петров	
Санкт-Петербургский государственный детский музыкальный театр "Карамболь"	Рижский проспект, 3 "Л"	1989	Artistic director-директор: заслуженный деятель искусств России Ирина Брондз	
Санкт-Петербургский детский мюзик-холл	Тамбовская улица, 63	1994	Artistic director: Андрей Скворцов	
Балет на льду Санкт-Петербурга	дирекция 8-я Советская улица, 56 А	1967	Главный балетмейстер: Константин Рассадин	
Санкт-Петербургский государственный детский ледовый театр	дирекция Лиговский проспект, 148	1990	Artistic director-директор театра: Алексей Фрадин	
Театр Аквариум	проспект Просвещения, 87	1996	Artistic director: Сергей Завадский	
Государственная филармония Санкт-Петербурга для детей и юношества	Большой Сампсониевский проспект, 79		Principal director: Заслуженный деятель искусств России Юрий Томошевский	

== Puppet theatres ==
Большой театр кукол	улица Некрасова, 10	1931	Главный режиссер: Руслан Кудашов
Санкт-Петербургский театр марионеток им. Е.С.Деммени	Невский проспект, 52	1918	Режиссер-постановщик: Эдуард Гайдай
Кукольный театр сказки	Московский проспект, 121	1944	Режиссёры: заслуженный деятель искусств России Игорь Игнатьев и заслуженный деятель искусств России Николай Боровков
Санкт-Петербургский государственный театр кукол "Бродячая собачка"	проспект Стачек, 59	1990	Artistic director: Альфия Абдулина
Детский интеграционный театр "Куклы"	улица Жака Дюкло, 6	2007	Artistic director: Тигран Сааков
Санкт-Петербургский театр пластики рук "Hand Made"		2007	Artistic director: Андрей Князьков
Театр-студия "Карлссон Хаус"	Набережная реки Фонтанки, 50, флигель во дворе	2006	Artistic director: Алексей Шишов
Театр "Кукольный формат"	На сцене театрального зала Музея Ф.М.Достоевского, Кузнечный переулок, 5/2	2002	
Театр "Потудань"		2002	Director: Руслан Кудашов

== Other theatres ==
Name	Address	Opening date	Artistic direction	Picture
Театр "Лицедеи"	улица Льва Толстого, 9	1978		
Клоун-мим-театр "Мимигранты"	Рижский проспект, 23	1990	Artistic director: Александр Плющ	
Зеленогорский Муниципальный театр Шкиды	Зеленогорск	1996	Artistic director и главный режиссер: Татьяна Збышевская	
Театр эстрады имени Аркадия Райкина	Большая Конюшенная улица, 27	1939	Artistic director: Юрий Гальцев	
Большой Санкт-Петербургский государственный цирк	Набережная реки Фонтанки, 3	1877	Директор: Виктор Саврасов	
Театр "Диклон"			Artistic director: Юрий Кретов	
Санкт-Петербургское театральное товарищество "Комик-Трест"		1991	Director: Вадим Фиссон	
Театр движения "Люди дождя"	Ремесленная улица, 6, квартира 4	2007	Artistic director: Курбатова Светлана	
Театр Morph	улица Белинского, 9, 4 этаж	2009	Principal director: Сергей Хомченков	
Театр Gabria-theatre		2008	Руководитель и режиссер: Роман Габрия	

== Theatrical and concert venues ==
Name	Address	Opening date	Picture
Эрмитажный театр государственного музея Эрмитаж	Дворцовая набережная, 32	1785	
Домашний театр Юсуповского дворца	набережная реки Мойки, 94	1836	
Большой зал Санкт-Петербургской государственной филармонии им. Д. Д. Шостаковича	Михайловская улица, 2	1839	
Малый зал Санкт-Петербургской государственной филармонии им. Д. Д. Шостаковича	Невский проспект, 30	1949	
Государственная академическая капелла Санкт-Петербурга	набережная реки Мойки, 20	1763	
Театр "Аврора Палас"	Пироговская набережная, 5		
Выборгский Дворец Культуры	улица Комиссара Смирнова, 15	1927	
Дворец культуры имени А. М. Горького	площадь Стачек, 4	1927	
Дворец культуры имени Ленсовета	Каменноостровский проспект, 42	1938	
Концертный Зал "Дом Композиторов"	Большая Морская улица, 45	1932	
Концертный зал у Финляндского	Арсенальная набережная, 13/1	1954	
Мальтийская капелла Воронцовского дворца	Садовая улица, 26	2009	
Санкт-Петербургская Государственная Филармония джазовой музыки	Загородный проспект, 27	1989	
Концертный зал "Карнавал"	Невский проспект, 39	1986	
Театрально-концертный зал им. Дзержинского	Полтавская улица, 12	1940	
Большой концертный зал "Октябрьский"	Лиговский проспект, 6	1967	
Ледовый дворец	Проспект Пятилеток, 1А	2000	
Петербургский Спортивно-Концертный Комплекс	проспект Юрия Гагарина, 8	1980	
Дом актёра им. К. С. Станиславского	Невский проспект, 86	1924	
Санкт-Петербургский Театральный центр на Коломенской	Коломенская улица, 43	2005	
Культурно-досуговый центр "Ижорский"	Колпино, Советский бульвар, 29	1985	
Петербург-концерт	набережная реки Фонтанки, 41	1930	
