= Pyotr Pimashkov =

Russian politician (1948–2021)

- Пётр Иванович Пимашков
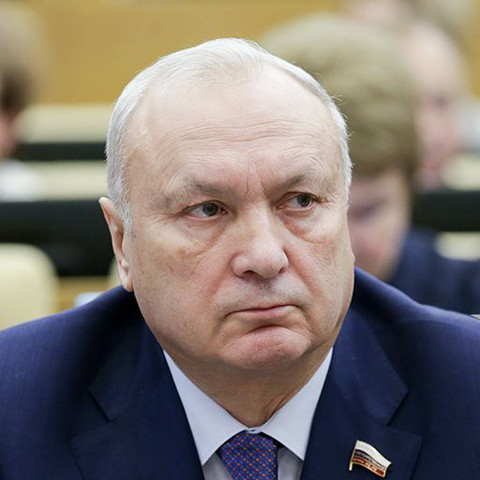
- Pimashkov in 2016

Member of the State Duma for Krasnoyarsk Krai
- In office 5 October 2016 – 12 August 2021
- Preceded by: constituency re-established
- Succeeded by: Aleksandr Drozdov
- Constituency: Central Krasnoyarsk (No. 55)

Member of the State Duma (Party List Seat)
- In office 21 December 2011 – 5 October 2016

Mayor of Krasnoyarsk
- In office 6 December 1996 – 14 December 2011
- Preceded by: Valery Pozdnyakov
- Succeeded by: Edkham Akbulatov

Personal details
- Born: 2 July 1948 Bovki, Bykhaw District, Mogilev Region, Byelorussian SSR, Soviet Union
- Died: 12 August 2021 (aged 73) Sochi, Russia
- Resting place: Badalyk Cemetery, Krasnoyarsk
- Party: Communist Party of the Soviet Union; United Russia
- Education: Krasnoyarsk Polytechnic College; Siberian Technological Institute; Krasnoyarsk State Academy of Nonferrous Metals and Gold
- Awards: Order "For Merit to the Fatherland" Fourth Class; Order of Honour; Order of Friendship; Order of Holy Prince Daniel of Moscow Second Class

Pyotr Ivanovich Pimashkov (Russian: Пётр Иванович Пимашков; 2 July 1948 – 12 August 2021) was a Russian politician. He served as a Deputy of the State Duma for its 6th and 7th convocations, between 2011 and 2021.

Born into a family of teachers in the Byelorussian Soviet Socialist Republic, Pimashkov began his career as a factory worker in Krasnoyarsk, with a short spell in the Soviet Armed Forces, before entering local politics with the Komsomol, and then the regional committees of the Communist Party of the Soviet Union. He studied as an engineer-economist during this period of his life and by the dissolution of the Soviet Union in 1991, he was head of administration of Krasnoyarsk's Sverdlovsk District. He held this position until 1996, when he was appointed acting mayor of Krasnoyarsk.

Pimashkov was confirmed in his position as mayor at the elections later that year, and went on to serve in this role for the next fifteen years, winning several more elections. He stepped down in 2011, having been elected to a deputy of the State Duma, where he would serve continuously until his death ten years later. Having developed his academic interest in economics, and receiving the degrees of candidate and then Doctor of Economic Sciences, he sat on the duma's constitutional legislation and state building committee during its sixth convocation, and its economic committee during its seventh. His political career was rewarded with several honours and awards, prior to his death as an incumbent member of the duma in 2021.

== Family and early life ==
Pimashkov was born into a family of teachers on 2 July 1948 in Bovki, Bykhaw District, Mogilev Region, then part of the Byelorussian Soviet Socialist Republic, in the Soviet Union. He began a career as an assembly fitter, and then design engineer, at the Krasnoyarsk Combine Plant in 1966. He worked in these roles at the plant until 1973, with a two year gap from 1968 to 1970 when he was conscripted into the Soviet Armed Forces. In 1973 he became secretary of the Oktyabrsky District Committee of the All-Union Lenin Communist Youth Union, and between 1978 and 1979 he was head of shop at the Krasnoyarsk Combine Plant. He had graduated from the mechanical faculty of the Siberian Technological Institute in 1977 with a degree as an engineer-economist.

From 1979 to 1986 Pimashkov worked as an instructor at the local regional committee, and then the Krasnoyarsk regional committee of the Communist Party of the Soviet Union. Between 1986 and 1987 he was chairman of the executive committee of Krasnoyarsk's Sverdlovsk District, and in 1987 he became first secretary of the Sverdlovsk District Committee of the Communist Party. In 1990 he became chairman of the Sverdlovsk Soviet of People's Deputies, and then in 1991 the head of Sverdlovsk District's administration.

== Post-Soviet politics ==
Pimashkov held the position of head of Sverdlovsk District's administration until 1996. He graduated from the Krasnoyarsk State Academy of Nonferrous Metals and Gold that year, being awarded the degree of candidate of economic sciences for his thesis topic "State regulation of the transition to a market economy." In May 1996, following the resignation of the former mayor of Krasnoyarsk, Valery Pozdnyakov, Pimashkov was appointed acting mayor. In the following election, on 8 December 1996, he received 58% of the vote and was elected mayor. He was re-elected on 10 December 2000 with 87.72% of the vote, and again on 14 March 2004 with 79.06% of the vote. For the 2 March 2008 elections he was a nominee of United Russia, and won with 70.43% of the vote. He submitted his resignation as mayor on 12 December 2011, and stepped down on 14 December, having been elected as a deputy of the State Duma for its sixth convocation. He was awarded the degree of Doctor of Economic Sciences in 2000 by the Plekhanov Russian University of Economics for his thesis "Coordination of the food market: concept, methodology, analysis".

In addition to his post as mayor of Krasnoyarsk, Pimashkov contested the position of governor of Krasnoyarsk Krai in the 8 September 2002 gubernatorial elections. He won fourth place with 14.30% of the vote. In the 2007 Russian legislative election, held on 2 December 2007, he was elected to the State Duma's 5th convocation as second-placed member of United Russia's party list for the regional group No. 25 (Krasnoyarsk Krai). He gave up his mandate and did not take a seat in the duma. He was again elected a deputy of the State Duma, this time in the 2011 Russian legislative election for the duma's sixth convocation, on 4 December 2011. He was again on the United Russia party list, as second place for the regional group No. 26 (Krasnoyarsk Krai). He took up his seat, and was a member of the Duma committee on constitutional legislation and state building. In the 2016 Russian legislative election for the duma's seventh convocation, Pimashkov was elected as a deputy for the single-mandate district No. 55 (Central - Krasnoyarsk Krai) with 40.78% of the vote. He sat on the duma's economic committee during its seventh convocation.

== Personal life and death ==
Pimashkov had a declared income of 4,992,000 rubles in 2015, rising to 5,860,000 rubles in 2020.

He was married, with a son and daughter.

Pimashkov died on 12 August 2021, at the age of 73, while on holiday in Sochi. The Chairman of the State Duma, Vyacheslav Volodin, expressed his condolences. A farewell ceremony was held at Krasnoyarsk's Great Concert Hall on 17 August, after which he was laid to rest alongside his wife, who had died in December 2008, in the alley of glory in Krasnoyarsk's Badalyk Cemetery.

== Awards ==
- 2008 – Order "For Merit to the Fatherland" Fourth Class
- 2003 – Order of Friendship
- 1998 – Order of Honour
