= Butusov =

Butusov (Russian: Буту́сов) is a Russian masculine surname originating from the nickname butus, which refers to a short, fat person; its feminine counterpart is Butusova. Additional variant of the name is Butusin/Butusina. The surname may refer to the following notable people:

- Mikhail Butusov (1900–1963), Soviet footballer and coach and bandy player
- Vasily Butusov (1892–1971), Russian and Soviet footballer
- Vyacheslav Butusov (born 1961), Soviet and Russian singer, leader of rock band Nautilus Pompilius
- Yuri Butusov (1961–2025), Russian theatre director

== See also ==
- Butuzov
