= Nadezhda Bromley =

Russian and Soviet actress, theatre director, poet, short story writer and playwright

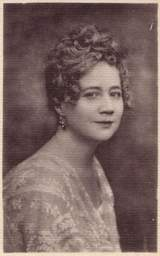
- Born: Nadezhda Nikolayevna Bromley; Надежда Николаевна Бромлей; 17 April 1884; Moscow, Russian Empire
- Died: 25 May 1966 (aged 82); Moscow, Russian Empire
- Occupations: actress, theatre director, poet, playwright
- Spouse: Boris Sushkevich
- Awards: Meritorious Artist of RSFSR (1932).

Nadezhda Nikolayevna Bromley (Russian: Надежда Николаевна Бромлей, 17 April 1884 — 25 May 1966) was a Russian and Soviet actress, theatre director, poet, short story writer and playwright. In 1932, she was honored as the Meritorious Artist of RSFSR.

== Biography ==
Born in Moscow to Nikolai (Carl) Eduardovich Bromley, a Russian industrialist of English origins, Nadezhda Bromley graduated from the Music and Drama School at the Russian Philharmonics and in 1908 joined the Moscow Art Theatre, with which she stayed until 1922. In 1911 she debuted as a poet with the collection Pathos (Пафос), experimenting in the vein of early Russian futurism and was for a while close to the Centrifuge group, led by Nikolai Aseyev and Boris Pasternak.

In 1918, she joined the MAT First Studio where she had moderate success as an actress (the nymph queen Goplana in Balladyna by Juliusz Słowacki, Erik's mother in August Strindberg's Erik XIV, Lear's fool in King Lear) and also debuted as a director, with The Daughter of Iorio by Gabriele D'Annunzio. Her own play The King of the Square Republic (Король Квадратной республики, 1925) was staged by Boris Sushkevich (her second husband) in MAT 2 (which had evolved from MAT 1 in 1924). Before that Yevgeny Vakhtangov had made an attempt to produce her tragicomedy Archangel Michael but it has never premiered. Bromley's short stories came out in two collections, The Confession of the Unwise (Исповедь неразумных, 1927) and Gargantua's Descendant (Потомок Гаргантюа, 1930).

In 1932, she was awarded the title Meritorious Artist of RSFSR and in 1933, moved to Leningrad. She joined the Academic Pushkin Theatre where she played (to much acclaim) Catherine the First in Peter the First by Alexey Nikolayevich Tolstoy (which she also directed) as well as produced and directed numerous plays including her own, The Duel (1934), after the eponymous Anton Chekhov's novella. Her late 1930s and 1950s productions have been described as "colourful and flamboyant." In 1944-1956, she headed the Leningrad Novy Theatre, was a reader in drama and translated several plays into Russian.

Nadezhda Bromley died on 25 May 1966 in Leningrad.
