= Sergey Boyarsky =

Russian politician (born 1980)

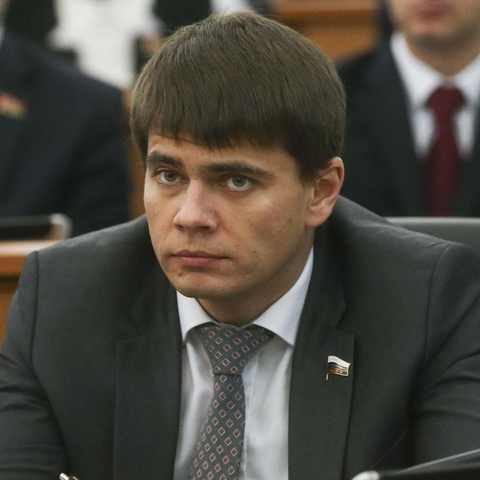

Chairman of the State Duma committee on information policy
- Incumbent
- Assumed office 17 December 2024
- Preceded by: Alexander Khinstein

Deputy of the State Duma Russia
- Incumbent
- Assumed office 18 September 2016
- Constituency: Saint Petersburg

Advisor to the Governor of Saint Petersburg
- In office 23 April 2012 – 18 September 2016

Personal details
- Born: 24 January 1980 (age 46) Leningrad, Russian Soviet Federative Socialist Republic, USSR
- Party: United Russia
- Parent(s): Mikhail Boyarsky, Larisa Luppian
- Education: Northwestern Management Institute Russian Presidential Academy of National Economy and Public Administration

Sergey Boyarsky (Russian: Сергей Михайлович Боярский; born 24 January 1980, Leningrad) is a Russian political figure. Chairman of the State Duma committee on information policy from 17 December 2024.

Deputy of the 7th, 8th State Duma and 9th State Duma convocations.

== Biografy ==
Sergey Boyarsky was born in the family of the famous Russian actors Mikhail Boyarsky and Larisa Luppian, and he even played in several movies as a child.

In 2002, he graduated from the Northwestern Management Institute, and in 2012 from the Russian Presidential Academy of National Economy and Public Administration.

In 2011 he ran for the Legislative Assembly of Saint Petersburg of the 5th convocation.

In 2012 he was appointed Advisor to the Governor of Saint Petersburg, Georgy Poltavchenko. From 2012 to 2016, he was also the head of the TV-channel Saint Petersburg. In December 2021, he headed the Saint Petersburg branch of the United Russia.

In 2016 Sergey Boyarsky was elected deputy of the 7th State Duma. In 2021, he was re-elected for the 8th State Duma.

== Legislative activity ==
From 2016 to 2019, while serving as a deputy of the seventh convocation of the State Duma, Boyarsky co-authored 21 legislative initiatives and amendments to draft federal laws.

In May 2021, together with fellow party member Yevgeny Revenko, he authored amendments to the law "On the Mass Media" that tightened the rules on citing other publications. Under the amended law, a media outlet is liable not only for its own publications but also for material cited from other outlets in cases where "the editor-in-chief [of the cited media outlet] cannot be identified and held liable". The amendments were introduced unexpectedly and adopted by parliament without debate.

In December 2025, Boyarsky, along with several other deputies, authored amendments to the Code of Administrative Offences of the Russian Federation providing for fines for the distribution of audiovisual works containing material that discredits traditional Russian spiritual and moral values and/or promotes their rejection.

Earlier, in July 2025, amendments on the same subject were adopted to the Federal Law "On Information, Information Technologies and Information Protection" and the Federal Law "On State Support for Cinematography of the Russian Federation". The amendments provide for the refusal or revocation of distribution certificates for such works, as well as monitoring their appearance on social media and restricting access to them.

== Family ==
- Great-grandfather — Archpriest Alexander Boyarsky (1885–1937), participant in the Renovationist schism.
- Grandfather and grandmother — actors of the Komissarzhevskaya Theatre, Sergey Boyarsky (1916–1976) and Yekaterina Melentyeva (1920–1990).
- Father — actor, singer, and television presenter Mikhail Boyarsky (b. 26 December 1949). Mother — actress Larisa Luppian (b. 26 January 1953).
- Sister — actress Elizaveta Boyarskaya (b. 20 December 1985).
- Wife — Yekaterina Boyarskaya (b. 28 November 1978), married since 1998.
- Daughters — Yekaterina (b. 28 November 1998) and Alexandra (b. 27 May 2008).

== Sanctions ==
He was sanctioned by the UK government in 2022 in relation to the Russo-Ukrainian War.

On 24 March 2022, the United States Treasury sanctioned him in response to the 2022 Russian invasion of Ukraine.
