= Communist University =

Communist University may refer to:

- Communist University of the National Minorities of the West
- Communist University of the Toilers of the East
- Leningrad Communist University
- Sverdlov Communist University
