= Wu Sheng (academic) =

Chinese nuclear specialist (1934–2023)

- 武胜
- Born: 23 September 1934; Acheng County, Binjiang Province, Manchukuo
- Died: 4 January 2023 (aged 88); China
- Education: State University of Non-Ferrous Metals and Gold
- Scientific career
- Fields: Nuclear material and process
- Workplaces: China Academy of Engineering Physics

Chinese name
- Simplified Chinese: 武胜
- Traditional Chinese: 武勝
Transcriptions
Standard Mandarin
- Hanyu Pinyin: Wǔ Shèng

Wu Sheng (Chinese: 武胜; 23 September 1934 – 4 January 2023) was a Chinese nuclear material and process specialist and academic, and an academician of the Chinese Academy of Engineering.

== Biography ==
Wu was born into a family of farming background in Acheng County, Binjiang Province (now Acheng District of Harbin, Heilongjiang), on 23 September 1934. In 1948 he attended Songjiang Provincial Xingzhi Normal School (松江省立行知师范学校). In 1950, he joined the China New Democratic Youth League and took part in the Korean War. He returned to Acheng No. 1 High School in June 1952, and was admitted to the Preparation Department of Beijing Institute of Foreign Languages (now Beijing Foreign Study University) in September 1954. He became a member of the Chinese Communist Party (CCP) in August 1953. In September 1955, he arrived in the Soviet Union to begin his education at Podrovski Iron and Steel Institute in Dnieper, and a year later transferred to the State University of Non-Ferrous Metals and Gold.

Wu returned to China in October 1960 and worked as an atomic bomb researcher in Beijing No. 9 Research Institute. In March 1964, he went to northwest China's Qinghai province and continued to develop the core components of the atomic bomb. In October, he transferred to the research work of thermonuclear component forming technology. Under the leadership of Song Jiashu, the technical director, Wu, as the leader of the technical team, undertook the research task of lithium hydrogen (deuteride) component forming technology, which is very important in hydrogen bombs. In January 1972, he became a workshop director in the 2nd Institute of the 9th Research Institute of the 2nd Mechanical Industry Ministry, serving in the post for exactly ten years. In March 1982, he was deputy factory director and then chief engineer of the 903 Factory, and served until December 1988. In January 1989, he was appointed chief engineer of the 7th Institute of China Academy of Engineering Physics, and held that office until August 1998.

On 4 January 2023, Wu died at the age of 88.

== Honours and awards ==
- 1987 State Technological Invention Award (Third Class) for the XX LiD parts hot pressing process
- 1989 State Science and Technology Progress Award (Special) for the major breakthrough in nuclear weapons
- 1999 Member of the Chinese Academy of Engineering (CAE)
