= Amyr Argamakov =

Russian military officer and politician

- Амыр Аргамаков
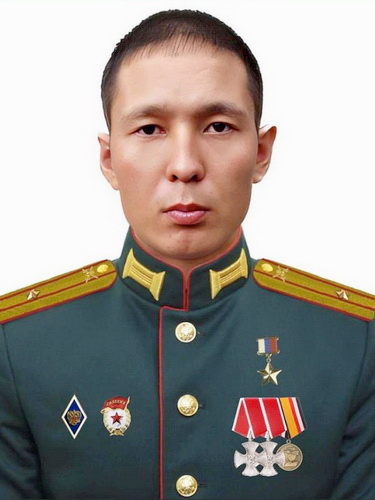

Russian Federation Senator from the Altai Republic
- Incumbent
- Assumed office 3 October 2024
- Preceded by: Tatyana Gigel

Personal details
- Born: Amyr Sergeyevich Argamakov; 9 July 1994 (age 32) Bichiktu-Boom, Altai Republic, Russia
- Party: United Russia
- Education: Moscow Higher Military Command School
- Occupation: Military officer
- Awards: Order of Courage (2); Hero of the Russian Federation

Military service
- Allegiance: Russia
- Branch: Russian Ground Forces
- Service years: 2013–2024
- Rank: Major
- Conflicts: Syrian civil war; Russian intervention; Russian invasion of Ukraine

Amyr Sergeyevich Argamakov (Russian: Амыр Сергеевич Аргамаков; born 9 July 1994) is a Russian military officer and politician serving as the senator from Altai since 3 October 2024. A major of the Russian Ground Forces and a veteran of the Russian intervention in the Syrian civil war and the Russian invasion of Ukraine, he was awarded the Hero of the Russian Federation title in 2024.

== Early life and military career ==
Argamakov was born on 9 July 1994 in the Bichiktu-Boom village in the Altai Republic. He is an ethnic Altai. From 2013 to 2017 he studied at the Moscow Higher Military Command School. After graduating from college, he became the commander of a motorized rifle platoon, then a motorized rifle company of the 71st Motorized Rifle Regiment of the 42nd Guards Motorized Rifle Evpatoriya Red Banner Division.

In 2018, he was deployed to Syria where he participated in combat operations during the Russian intervention in the Syrian civil war. Since February 2022, he took part in the Russian invasion of Ukraine. In 2023, he was appointed chief of staff of a motorized rifle battalion and was twice awarded the Order of Courage. In January 2024, President Vladimir Putin awarded him the title of the Hero of the Russian Federation.

In March 2024, he was appointed chairman of the “Union of Veterans of the Northern Military District” for the Altai Republic.

== Political career ==
On 3 October 2024, the head of the Altai Republic Andrey Turchak appointed Argamakov the senator from Altai.

== Awards ==
- By decree of President Vladimir Putin in January 2024, awarded the title of Hero of the Russian Federation for “courage and heroism displayed in the performance of a combat mission”.
- Order “Taŋ Cholmon” (Order of the Morning Star), Republic of Altai.
- Honorary Citizen of Onguday District.
