= Vera Korsakova =

Vera Korsakova may refer to:

- Vera Korsakova (hurdler)
- Vera Korsakova (politician)
