= Boris Sushkevich =

Russian-Soviet actor, theatre director and reader in drama

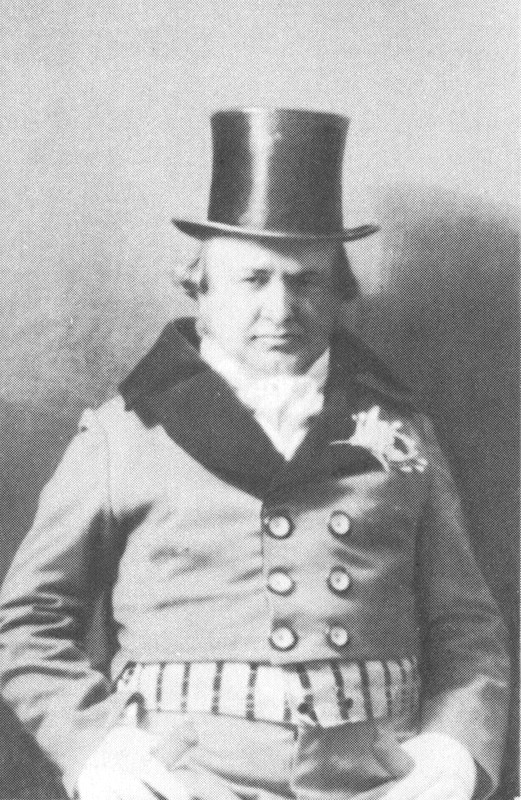
- As the Author, in The Cricket on the Hearth, 1914
- Born: Boris Mikhaylovich Sushkevich; Борис Михайлович Сушкевич; February 7, 1887; Saint Petersburg, Russian Empire
- Died: July 10, 1946 (aged 59); Leningrad, Soviet Union
- Occupations: stage actor, theatre director, pedagogue

Boris Mikhaylovich Sushkevich (Russian: Борис Михайлович Сушкевич, 7 February 1887 — 10 July 1946) was a St. Petersburg-born Russian, Soviet actor, theatre director and reader in drama, honoured with the titles Meritorious Artist of RSFSR (1933) and People's Artist of RSFSR (1944).

== Theatre ==
A Moscow University alumnus, Sushkevich joined the Moscow Art Theatre in 1912. A co-founder of the First Studio and one of its leaders, along with Yevgeny Vakhtangov, working under Leopold Sulerzhitsky, after the latter's death in 1916, he became its director and held this post until in 1924 it was re-organized into MAT-2, with Mikhail Chekhov at the helm. In 1919 Sushkevich directed The Robbers Friedrich Schiller at the just opened Great Drama Theater in Petrograd.

In 1933 he moved to Leningrad and became the director of the Alexandrinsky Theatre, and in 1937 took up the directorship of the New Theatre (later Lensovet Theatre), where he remained the head of till his death in 1946. His artistic peak is considered to be the 1940 production of Gerhart Hauptmann's Before Sunrise in which he himself played the leading role.

== Teaching ==
In 1933 Sushkevich became a professor and, from 1936, the director of the Leningrad Theatre Institute.

== Film ==
Between 1914 and 1927 Sushkevich was cast in five Soviet films, including Tsar Ivan Vasilyevich Grozny (Malyuta Skuratov, 1915) with Fyodor Shalyapin in the lead. He authored the book Seven Aspects of Working Upon the Part (Семь моментов работы над ролью, 1933).

== Personal life ==
Actress, theatre director and writer Nadezhda Bromley was his wife.
