= Bichiktu-Boom =

Bichiktu-Boom Бичикту-Боом
- Selo
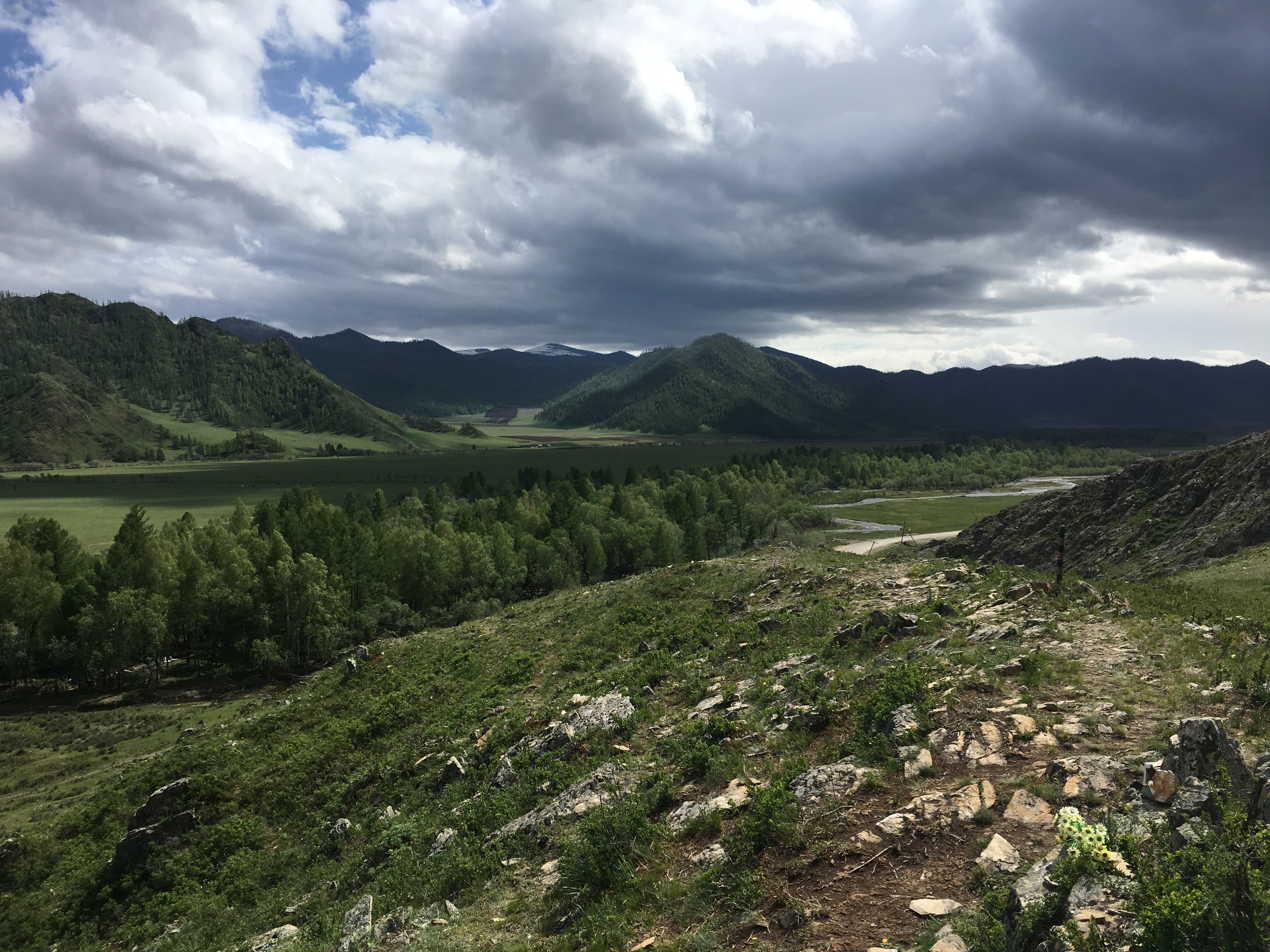
- The valley just north of the village with fields and the road to the village.

- Location within Altai Republic Location within Russia
- Coordinates: 50°47′N 85°54′E
- Country: Russia
- Region: Altai Republic
- District: Ongudaysky District
- Time zone: UTC+7:00

Bichiktu-Boom (Russian: Бичикту-Боом; Altay: Бичиктӱ-Боом, Biçiktü-Boom) is a rural locality (a selo) in Ongudaysky District, the Altai Republic, Russia. The population was 241 as of 2016.

Bichiktu-Boom is located 20 km northwest of Onguday (the district's administrative centre) by road. Karakol is the nearest rural locality.

== Notable people ==
- Amyr Argamakov, military officer and politician
