= Artur Kokhoyev =

Russian politician (born 1982)

- Артур Кохоев
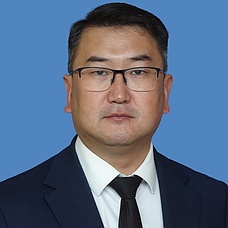

Senator from Altai Republic
- In office 26 September 2024 – Incumbent
- Preceded by: Tatyana Gigel

Personal details
- Born: 1 June 1982 (age 44) Gorno-Altaysk, RSFSR, Soviet Union
- Party: United Russia
- Education: Novosibirsk State University of Economics and Management; Russian Presidential Academy of National Economy and Public Administration

Artur Pavlovich Kokhoyev (Russian: Артур Кохоев; born June 1, 1982, in Gorno-Altaysk, Altai Krai, USSR) is a Russian politician and economist. He has served as a Senator in the Federation Council, the upper house of the Russian parliament representing the legislative branch of the Altai Republic, since September 26, 2024. He is a member of the Federation Council Committee on Constitutional Legislation and State Building and a member of the Federation Council Commission on the Protection of State Sovereignty of the Russian Federation.

== Biography ==
He graduated from the Novosibirsk State Academy of Economics and Management with a degree in finance and credit in 2004. He then completed a European management program at the Russian Presidential Academy of National Economy and Public Administration.

In 2005, he was appointed economist in the Altai Republic Government Administration. He was later transferred to the position of leading specialist in the accounting and reporting department of the financial and economic administration. In 2007, he became assistant to the First Deputy Prime Minister of the Altai Republic, Yuri Antaradonov.

In 2010, he was appointed deputy minister of labour, social development, and employment. In March 2017, he was appointed acting deputy prime minister of the Republic and head of the Unified Office of the Head and Government of the Republic. In 2019, he was elected as a deputy of the Altai Republic State Assembly, where he chaired the Committee on Economic, Financial, and Tax Policy.

On March 4, 2021, at the regular session of the State Assembly of the Altai Republic, his candidacy, nominated by the United Russia party for the post of Speaker of the Republic's Parliament, was supported by 33 of the 40 deputies present. Four voted against. Three ballots were declared invalid.

On September 26, 2024, he was appointed Senator of the Russian Federation from the State Assembly of the Altai Republic. On October 9, 2024, he became a member of the Federation Council Committee on Constitutional Legislation and State Building.
