= Aleksandr Borisov (politician) =

Russian politician

- Александр Борисов
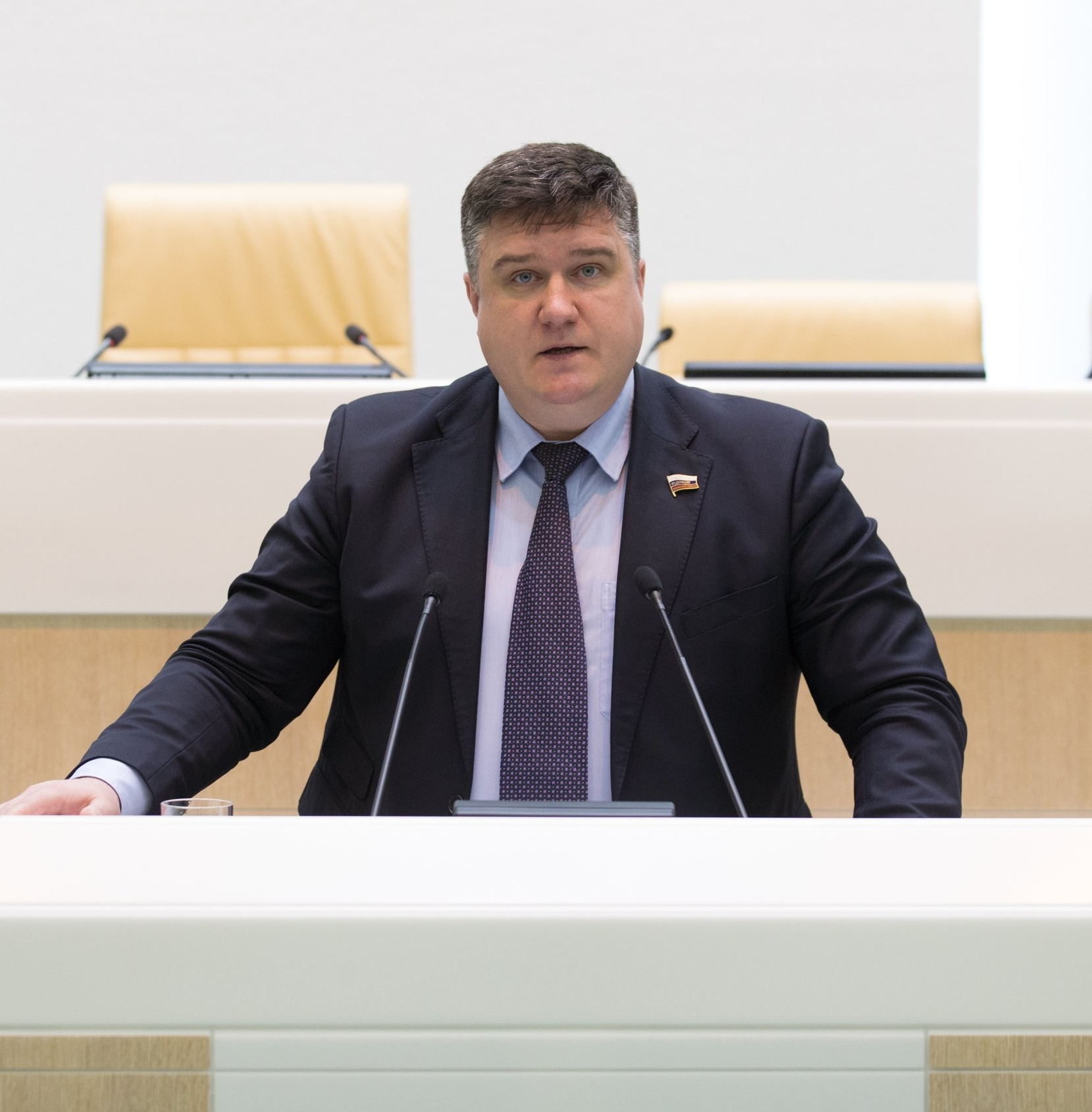
- Borisov in 2016

Deputy of the 8th State Duma
- Incumbent
- Assumed office 12 October 2021

Head of the Central Executive Committee of the United Russia
- In office 11 January 2018 – 17 November 2021

Personal details
- Born: 17 August 1974 (age 52) Kunya, Pskov Oblast, Russian Soviet Federative Socialist Republic, USSR
- Party: United Russia
- Education: Northwestern Management Institute

Aleksandr Borisov (Russian: Александр Александрович Борисов; born 17 August 1974, Kunya, Pskov Oblast) is a Russian political figure, deputy of the 8th State Duma. After graduating in 1997 from the Northwestern Management Institute, Borisov started working as a lawyer in one of the companies in Saint Peterburg. Later he continued working at the various factories, including "Mekhanichesky Zavod" and "Leninez".

His political career started in 2005 when he was appointed the head of the Central Staff of the All-Russian Public Organization Young Guard of United Russia. From 2009 to 2017, he was a member of the Federation Council, and in 2013, he was appointed Deputy Chairman of the committee on social policy. From 2017 to 2021, he headed the Central Executive Committee of the United Russia. Since September 2021, he has served as a deputy of the 8th State Duma.

== Sanction ==
On 24 March 2022, the United States Treasury sanctioned him in response to the 2022 Russian invasion of Ukraine.
