= Butuzov =

Butuzov (Russian: Бутузов) is a Russian masculine surname originating from the nickname butuz, which refers to a short, fat person; its feminine counterpart is Butusova. The surname may refer to the following notable people:

- Lyudmila Butuzova (born 1957), Soviet high jumper
- Natalya Butuzova (born 1954), Soviet archer

== See also ==
- Butusov
