= Alexander Drozdov =

Russian politician (born 1970)

- Александр Дроздов
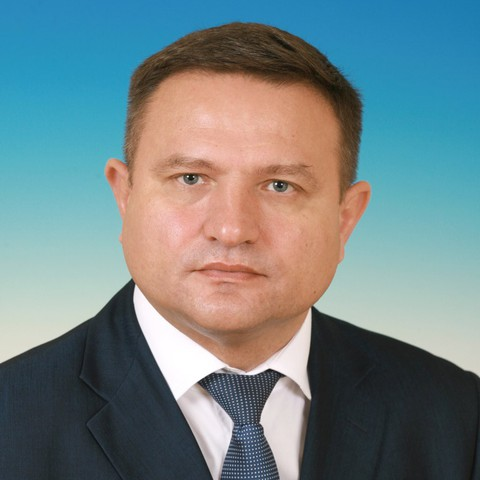
- official portrait, circa 2021

Member of the State Duma for Krasnoyarsk Krai
- Incumbent
- Assumed office 12 October 2021
- Preceded by: Pyotr Pimashkov
- Constituency: Central Krasnoyarsk (No. 55)

Personal details
- Born: 1 November 1970 (age 55) Krasnoyarsk, Krasnoyarsk Krai, Russian SFSR, USSR
- Party: United Russia
- Children: 3
- Education: Krasnoyarsk State University

Alexander Sergeyevich Drozdov (Russian: Алекса́ндр Серге́евич Дроздо́в; born 1 November 1970, Krasnoyarsk) is a Russian political figure and a deputy of the 8th State Duma.

From 1993 to 2016, Alexander Drozdov served in law enforcement. From 2016 to 2021, he served as deputy director for Government Relations and Special Projects of the aluminum division of the Rusal company. On 14 November 2017 he became a member of the United Russia. In 2018 he was elected deputy of the Krasnoyarsk City Council of Deputies. Drozdov left the post in 2021 as he was elected deputy of the 8th State Duma from the Krasnoyarsk constituency. He ran with the United Russia.

Alexander Drozdov is married and has three children.

== Sanctions ==
He was sanctioned by the UK government in 2022 in relation to the Russo-Ukrainian War.
