= Korsak =

Korsak (Korsack) is a surname. The word literally means a species of Central Asian fox, Corsac fox. Notable people with the surname include:

- Adam Korsak
- Ivan Korsak
- Józef Korsak
- Olga Korsak
- Rafajil Korsak
- Vince Korsak
- Sergey Korsak
- Mary Phil Korsak

== Fictional characters ==
- Korsak Brothers series

== See also ==
- Korsakov
- Korsakas
