= Uymen =

Uymen Уймень
- Village
- Location within Altai Republic Location within Russia
- Coordinates: 51°39′N 86°55′E
- Country: Russia
- Region: Altai Republic
- District: Choysky District
- Time zone: UTC+7:00

Uymen (Russian: Уймень; Altay: Ӱймен, Üymen) is a rural locality (a selo) and the administrative centre of Uymenskoye Rural Settlement of Choysky District, the Altai Republic, Russia. The population was 387 as of 2016. There are 6 streets.

== Geography ==
Uymen is located east from Gorno-Altaysk, in the valley of the Uymen River, 71 km southeast of Choya (the district's administrative centre) by road. Karakoksha is the nearest rural locality.
