= Rosgeologia =

Russian state-owned holding company

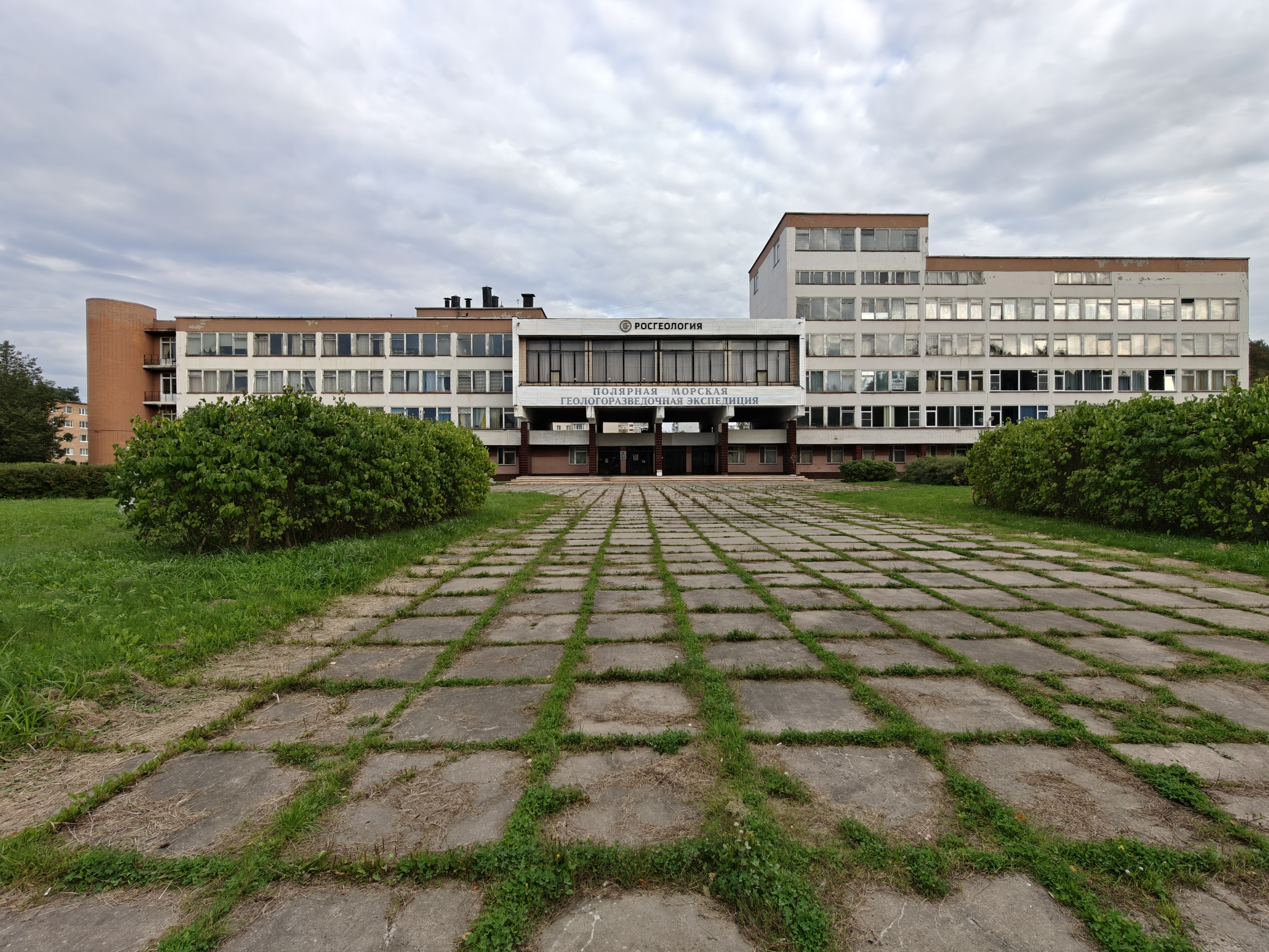
- Company headquarters
- Native name: Росгеология
- Industry: Economic geology, Mining engineering
- Founded: 1993; 33 years ago
- Headquarters: Moscow, Russia
- Key people: Sergei Gorkov (General director)
- Website: rosgeo.com

Joint-Stock Company Rosgeologia (Russian: Акционерное общество «Росгеология») is a Russian state-owned holding company, headquartered in Moscow, uniting state-owned geological exploration enterprises of the Russian Federation. It was established in 2011 and is included in the list of strategic enterprises.

== History ==
In 2004, the corporatization of Tsentrgeologiya, which had previously been a Federal State Unitary Enterprise, was completed. Tsentrgeologiya was the successor to the Moscow Branch of the Geological Committee. The branch was established on October 19, 1918, by a special resolution of the Supreme Soviet of the National Economy. The official "Regulations on the Moscow Branch of the Geological Committee" were published on December 6, 1918. The branch became the first Territorial Geological Service in the RSFSR, whose responsibilities included: "Systematic geological exploration of the RSFSR's territories, identification of the Federation's subsoil resources, and their protection in accordance with the Government's assignments, plans, and directives to create a raw material base for the mining industry, to accelerate the compilation of a general geological map of the RSFSR, and to serve agriculture and the national economy as a whole in order to maximize the discovery of the RSFSR's mineral wealth for industrialization".

The Moscow Branch of the Geological Committee was headed by a three-person council, whose first chairman was mining engineer A. N. Ryabinin. The total staff at that time was 53. Initially, the branch focused primarily on geological surveying; in subsequent years, the company's activities expanded significantly.

The idea of creating a unified production structure based on state-owned geological enterprises was first voiced in March 2008. The Ministry of Natural Resources and Environment presented a concept for the industry's development, establishing a state corporation called "Geologorazvedka" (Geological Exploration) based on geological federal state unitary enterprises controlled by Federal Agency for Mineral Resources and the Federal Agency for State Property Management. At the same time, this issue was widely discussed at parliamentary hearings in the Federation Council on the topic "The State and Problems of Legislative Support for Geological Exploration of Subsoil in Russia".

The Ministry of Natural Resources and Environment of Russia announced plans to create "Rosgeologia" on October 2, 2009. The holding company was planned to include state-owned geological enterprises: foundations, research institutes, and geological exploration companies. Deputy Prime Minister Igor Sechin supported the idea and soon submitted the project to the Russian government for consideration.

In 2010, the Russian government reviewed and approved the "Strategy for the Development of the Geological Industry in Russia until 2030", where the creation of Rosgeologia was designated as one of the stages of reforming the Russian geological industry. In July 2011, a Presidential Decree on the creation of Rosgeologia and a corresponding Order of the Government of Russia were issued.

The company was founded on July 15, 2011, by Decree of the President of Russia No. 957 "On the Open Joint-Stock Company Rosgeologia" by renaming PAO Tsentrgeologiya (Moscow). The renaming occurred on the basis of Order of the Government of Russia No. 1383-r of August 3, 2011, and Rosimushchestvo Order No. 1952-r of September 14, 2011.

The first General Director of Rosgeologia was Sergey Donskoy, who held this post until May 2012, when he was appointed Minister of Natural Resources and Environment of the Russian Federation.

From July 2013 to April 2019, Roman Panov served as the holding company's General Director. From April 2019 to April 2024, Sergey Nikolaevich Gorkov served as CEO.

In February 2014, at a meeting chaired by Russian Minister of Natural Resources and Environment Sergey Donskoy, a decision was made to establish a Coordination Center for the Study and Development of Unconventional Types and Sources of Hydrocarbon Raw Materials within Rosgeologia.

In October 2014, the government considered the possibility of transforming the holding company into a State Corporation and granting it additional powers in the face of the complicated international situation. This initiative was later approved by Vladimir Putin.
