= Tatyana Gigel =

Russian politician (born 1960)

- Татьяна Гигель
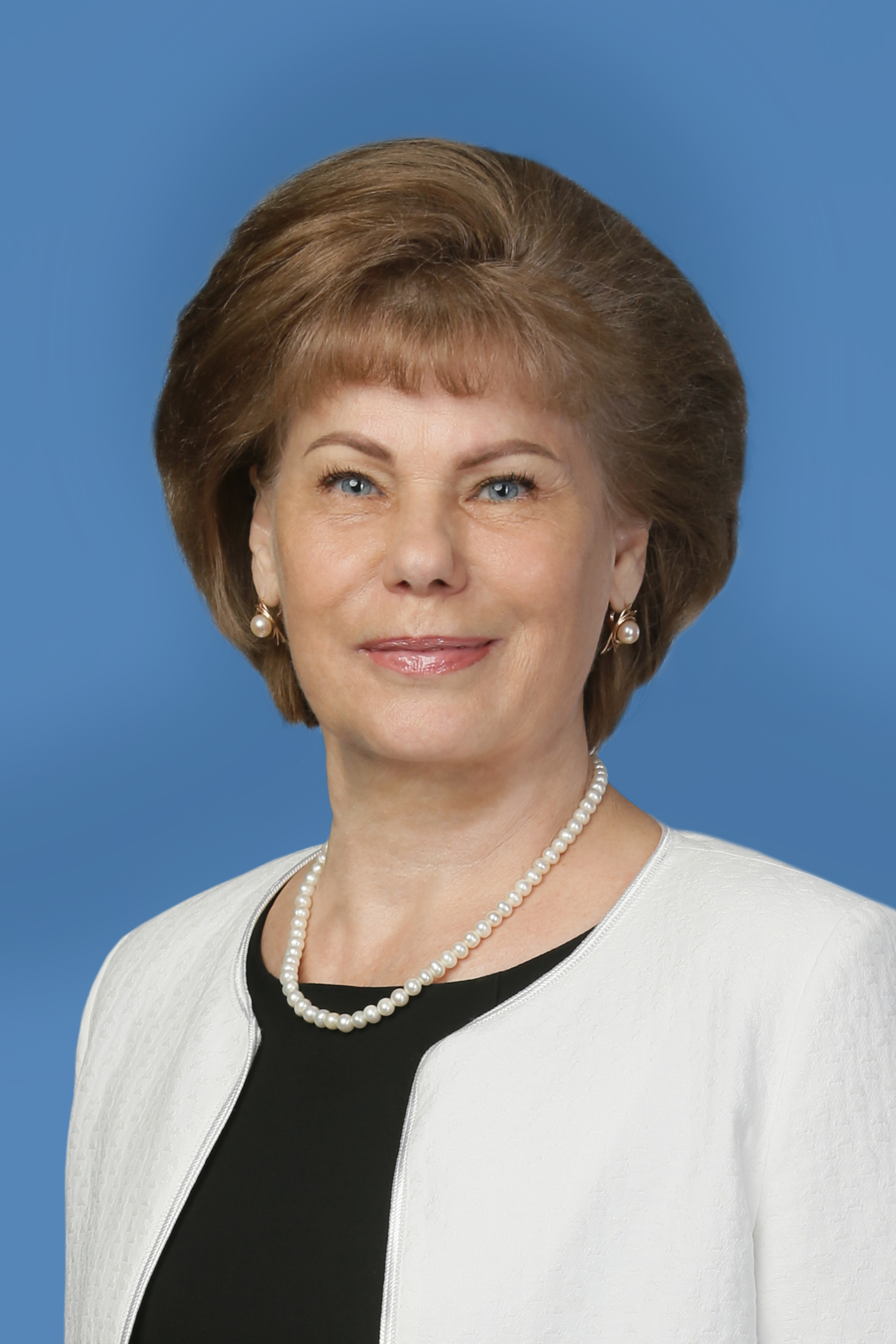

Russian Federation Senator from the Altai Republic
- Incumbent
- Assumed office 30 September 2014 Serving with Vladimir Poletaev
- Preceded by: Ralif Safin

Member of the State Assembly of the Altai Republic
- Incumbent
- Assumed office 2001

Personal details
- Born: Tatyana Gigel; 27 February 1960 (age 66) Uymen, Russian SFSR, Gorno-Altai AO, Soviet Union (now Altai Republic, Russia)
- Party: United Russia
- Education: Siberian State Technological University

Tatyana Anatolyevna Gigel (Russian: Татьяна Анатольевна Гигель; born 27 February 1960) is a Russian politician who is serving as a senator from the Altai Republic since 2014. She has also served in her state legislature since 2001.

== Biography ==
Gigel was born on 27 February 1960 in the Gorno-Altai village of Uymen in Soviet Russia.

In 1987, she graduated from the Siberian State Technological University, four years before the fall of the Soviet Union. She worked at the Karakoksha timber industry enterprise until the 2000s.

In 2001, she successfully ran for a seat in the State Assembly of the Altai Republic. She has been re-elected in 2006, 2010, 2014 and 2019. Gigel represents the Choysky District. During her time as an Assemblywoman, she served on Budget Committee, became Deputy Chair of the Assembly and headed the regional branch of the ruling United Russia party.

In September 2014, she was chosen by the assembly to simultaneously represent the republic in the Federation Council. As a Senator, she serves on the Agriculture Committee.

In 2022, she voted to effectively recognise the independence of the Donetsk and Lugansk people's republics from Ukraine. As a result, she was sanctioned by the United States, Canada, United Kingdom, European Union, Switzerland, Australia and New Zealand.
