= Yuri Butusov =

Russian theatre director (1961–2025)

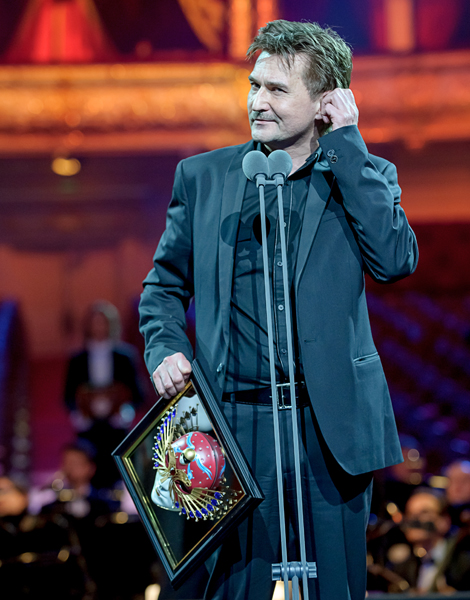
Butusov accepting the 2014 Golden Mask Award

Yuri Nikolayevich Butusov (Russian: Юрий Николаевич Бутусов; 24 September 1961 – 9 August 2025) was a Russian theatre director.

== Life and career ==
Butusov was born in Gatchina on 24 September 1961. In 1996 he graduated from the directing department of the St. Petersburg State Academy of Theater Arts. From 1996 he worked as a director at the Lensovet Theatre. In September 2018, he was invited to the post of chief director of the Vakhtangov Theatre.

In 2011, he won the Golden Mask Award in the category 'Best Direction in a Drama' for The Seagull. He won a second Golden Mask Award in 2014 for Macbeth. Cinema, and The Good Person of Szechwan.

On 9 August 2025, Butusov drowned in the Black Sea while on vacation in Bulgaria. He was 63.

== See also ==
- List of Russian speaking theatre directors in the 20th and 21st centuries
