= Korsak coat of arms =

Polish coat of arms

Korsak
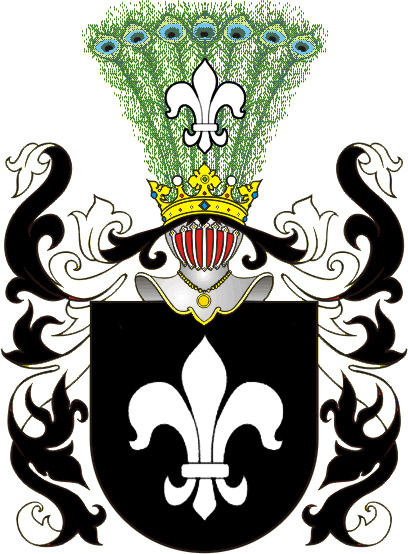
- Earliest mention: 1226
- Families: Jasniewicz, Korsak

Korsak is a Polish coat of arms. It was used by several szlachta families in the times of the Polish–Lithuanian Commonwealth.

== Blazon ==
Sable, a fleur-de-lis Argent.

== Notable bearers ==
Notable bearers of this coat of arms include:

- Sebastian Korsak

== See also ==
- Polish heraldry
- Heraldry
- Coat of arms
