= Vladimir Poletaev =

Russian politician

- Владимир Полетаев
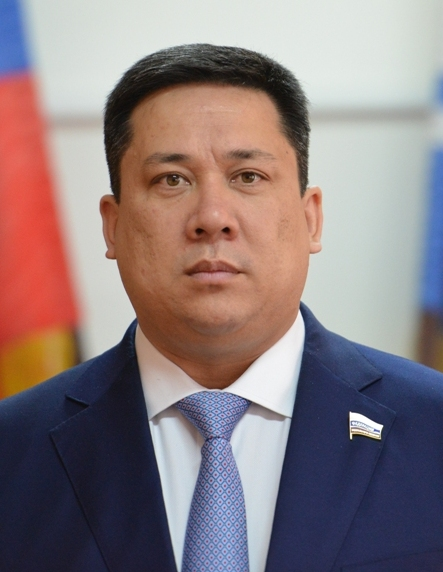

Russian Federation Senator from the Altai Republic
- Incumbent
- Assumed office 30 September 2014 Serving with Tatyana Gigel
- Preceded by: Viktor Lopatnikov

Minister for the Economy of the Altai Republic
- In office 2006–2010

Minister for Property Relations of the Altai Republic
- In office 2004–2006

Personal details
- Born: Vladimir Poletaev; 23 May 1975 (age 51) Gorno-Altaysk, Gorno-Altai AO, Russian SFSR, Soviet Union (now Altai Republic, Russia)
- Party: United Russia
- Education: Altai State University

Vladimir Vladimirovich Poletaev (Russian: Владимир Владимирович Полетаев; born 27 June 1972) is a Russian politician serving as a senator from the Altai Republic since 2014.

Educated in economics and public administration, he held a number of statewide positions, before moving to the Federal Taxation Service shortly prior to his appointment to the Federation Council.

== Early life and education ==
Vladimir Poletaev was born on 23 May 1975, in Gorno-Altaysk, the capital city of the Altai Republic in Soviet Russia.

In 1997, he graduated from the Altai State University. In 2002, he received a doctoral degree from the Russian Academy of the National Economy and Public Administration, overseen by the office of the President of Russia.

== Career ==
At the age of just twenty-two, he was appointed Chief Inspector of the Legal Department of the Altai Republic customs, the regional customs office, although he only served one year in the position. He went on to lead the Department of State Entreprise Bankruptcies of the Altai Republic, responsible for property management. Afterwards, he served as Head of the Federal Financial Recovery Service of Russia in the region. In 2004, he was appointed the Minister of Property Relations of the Altai Republic. He left the role in 2006, but remained a Minister, now leading the Ministry of Economic Development and Investments.

In 2010, he was appointed to federal office, becoming a Deputy Head in the Department of the Federal Tax Service (FTS) of Russia, overseeing Altai.

On 30 September 2014, he was appointed as one of the two representatives of the Altai Republic in the Federation Council by Alexander Berdnikov, Head of the Republic. As a senator, he effectively voted to recognise the independence of the Donetsk and Lugansk people's republics from Ukraine. As a result, in addition to being sanctioned by Ukraine itself, he was also sanctioned by the United States, Canada, United Kingdom, European Union, Switzerland, Australia and New Zealand.
