= Karakoksha =

Karakoksha Каракокша
- Village
- Location within Altai Republic Location within Russia
- Coordinates: 51°45′N 86°41′E
- Country: Russia
- Region: Altai Republic
- District: Choysky District
- Time zone: UTC+7:00

Karakoksha (Russian: Каракокша; Altay: Кара-Кӧкши, Kara-Kökşi) is a rural locality (a selo) and the administrative centre of Karakokshinskoye Rural Settlement of Choysky District, the Altai Republic, Russia. The population was 1351 as of 2016. There are 17 streets.

== Geography ==
Karakoksha is located southeast of Gorno-Altaysk, in the valley of the Sarakoksha River, 54 km south of Choya (the district's administrative centre) by road. Kuzya is the nearest rural locality.
