= Andrey Korsakov =

Russian linguist

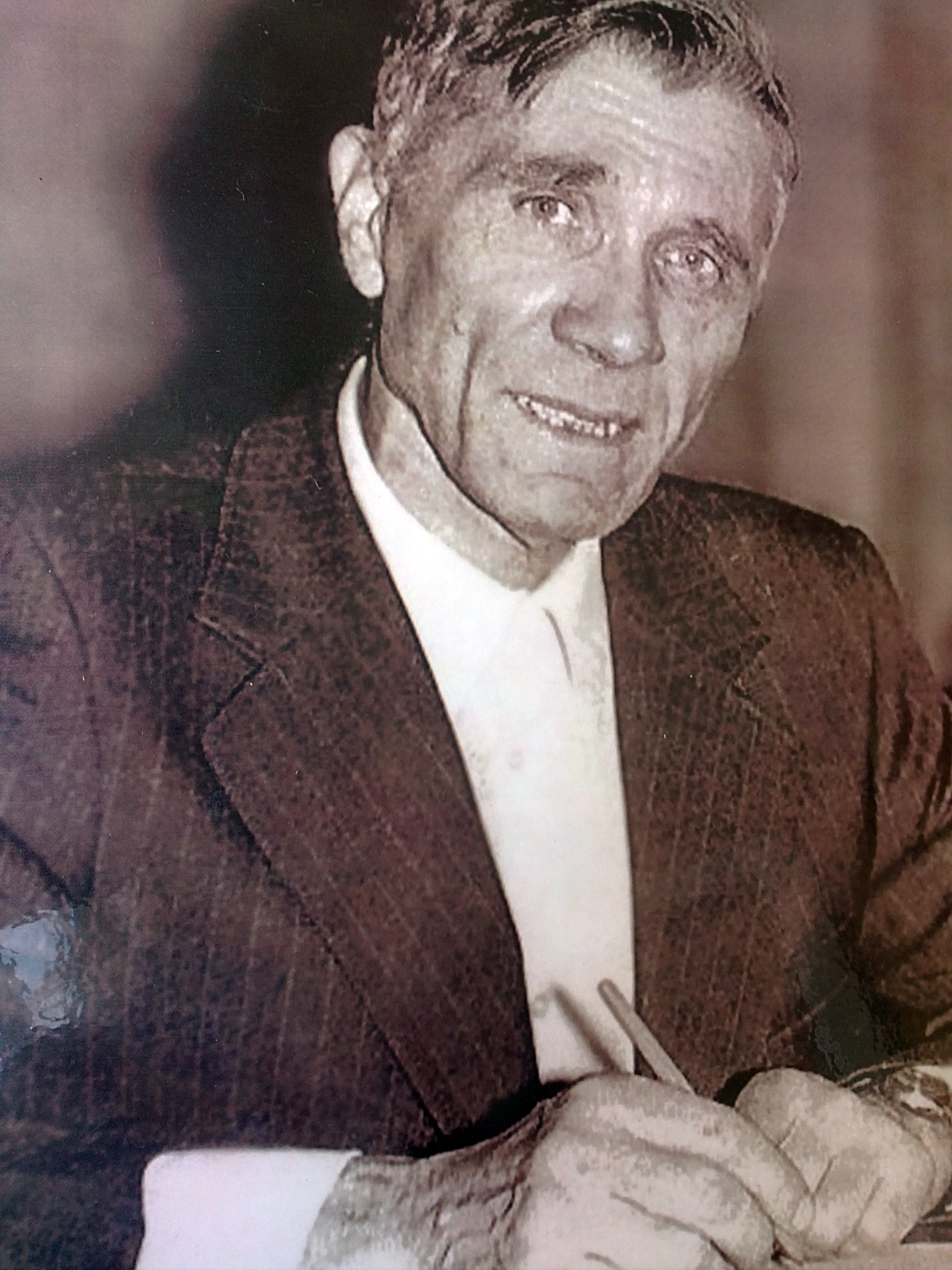
Andrey Korsakov

Andrey Konstantinovich Korsakov (Russian: Андрей Константинович Корсаков, Ukrainian: Андрій Костянтинович Корсаков; 30 October 1916 – 2007) was an eminent Russian and Ukrainian linguist and language philosopher who specialised in the grammar of the English language and is considered a father of Grammar School in Ukraine. Having organised the Chair of English Grammar at Odessa National Mechnikov University in 1963, he was at the head of it for the following 30 years. Within this period, as a scientific adviser, Korsakov supervised over 30 candidate theses, thus influencing the linguistic minds throughout the USSR. Professor Korsakov was one of the first to give philosophic interpretation of grammatical phenomena. The basis of his linguistic school makes up philosophic understanding conceivable reality as an interconnected system of things, their qualities and relations.

== Biography ==
Andrey (Russian for 'Andrew') Korsakov was born on 30 October 1916 in Taganrog, Russia, to the family of an electrician and a housewife, and had three brothers. After finishing school in 1930, he worked at the tannery as an electrician’s apprentice up to 1934 when Korsakov went to Leningrad Polytechnic University. An electrical engineer, he was given to forced labour in Austria by the Nazis in 1943. His non-cooperation sent him to a prisoners of war camp. On being liberated by the Soviet Army two years later, Korsakov served first as an interpreter, and later on as an undercover agent for the USSR at the territories occupied by British and American troops. There is no official information on where and how the former engineer acquired comprehensive knowledge of the English and German languages, but only the latter accounts for his passing himself as a German or American native.

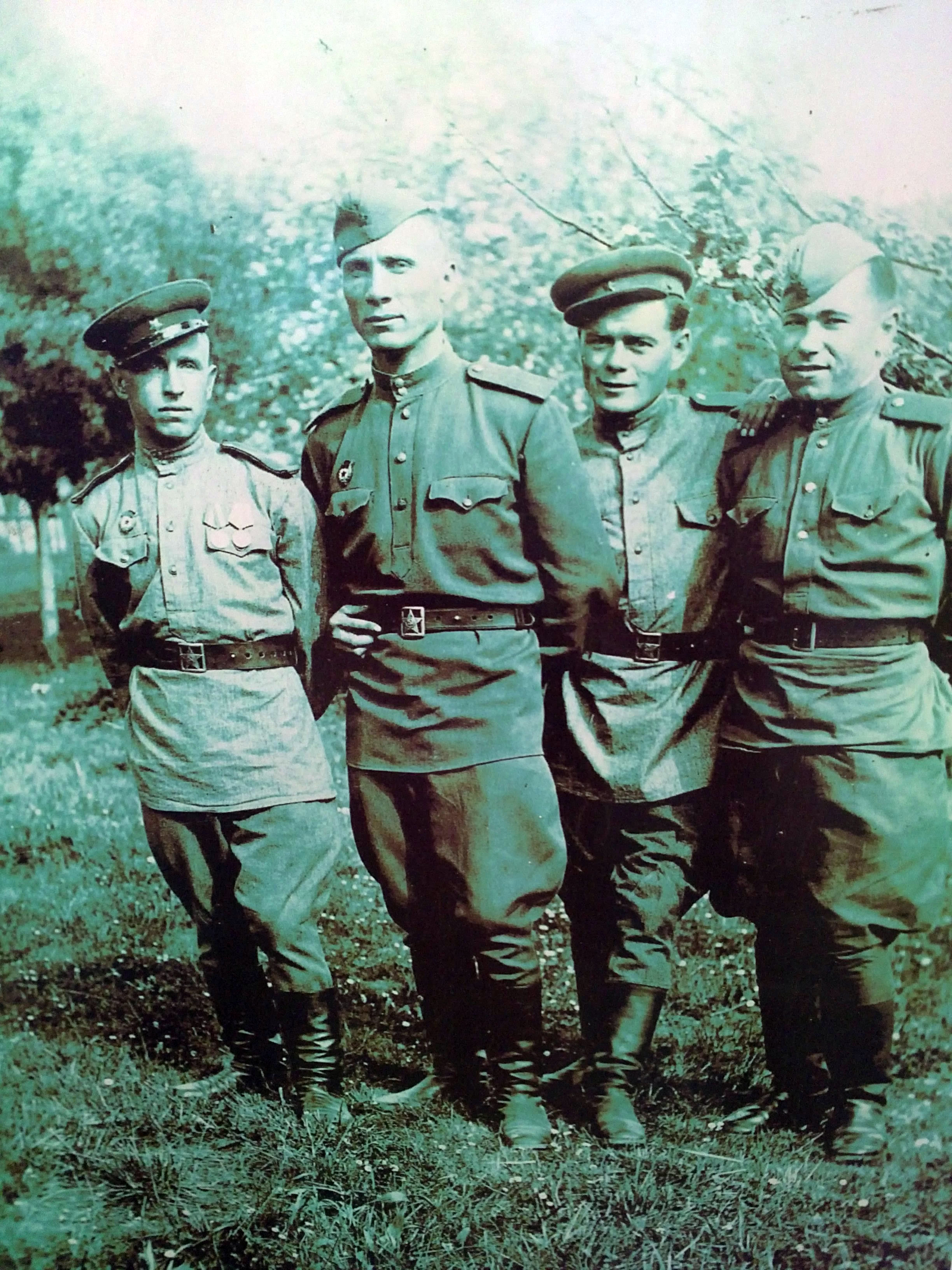

Andrey Korsakov married an American national who gave birth to his two sons, Andrey (Jr.) and Alexander. In the family circle only English was spoken, thus resulting in bilingualism of Korsakov's children.

The 1950s found Korsakov teaching English and Electrical Engineering at Lvov Polytechnic. Korsakov earned his higher linguistic education in Germanic philology at Lvov University from where he externally graduated with honours. After the defence of his candidate thesis in 1958 he moved to Odessa to head the Chair of English Studies, and the Department of Romance and Germanic Philology as its Dean. Earning his doctoral degree 5 years later, the full-fledged Professor Korsakov headed the Chair of Grammar for 30 years. There he continued his own scientific research and guidance of that of his numerous followers from all the corners of the CIS. The number of Korsakov's post-graduate students exceeds over 30, thirty of them defended their theses and are working on in the realms of Korsakov's Grammar School. Andrey Korsakov formed the linguistic minds of many generations up to his death in 2007.

== Legacy ==
Three published substantial single-authored monographic works by Andrey Korsakov give the all-round study of the aspect and tense problem in Modern English indicative. Two more provide the fundamental interpretation of Modern English syntax and morphology through the paradigm of Korsakov's theory, but are yet unpublished. Over 50 scientific articles by Korsakov address topical linguistic issues. Among Prof. Korsakov's many accomplishments are more than forty English learners’ guides, and course books on English Grammar. In 2000 the University of Cambridge rated him among the top 20 linguists of the millennium.

== Linguistic versatility ==
Linguistics occupied the key role in Korsakov's life. Already 80-odd years old, the scholar took up Modern Greek, to comprise two course books on its grammar and a Russian-Greek phrasebook by the claim of the Greek Publishing house. By the end of his life, he acquired a good command and studied linguistic peculiarities of the English, German, Greek, Italian, Finnish, Mongolian, and Chinese languages.

== Selected publications ==
- Корсаков А.К. Претеріт в системі видочасових дієслівних форм в сучасній англійській мові. - Львів: ЛДУ, 1958.
- The use of tenses in English. Korsakov, A. K. (Andreĭ Konstantinovich). 1969. Korsakov, A. K. Structure of Modern English pt. 1. oai:gial.edu:26766 at http://www.language-archives.org/item/oai:gial.edu:26766
- Korsakov A.K. The Use of Tenses in English (second ed., revised). - Kiev: Vyshcha Shkola, 1978.
- Корсаков, А.К. Категория вида в современном английском языке: Автореф. дис. ... д-ра филол. наук. Тбилиси, 1970. - 43 с.
- Корсаков А.К. Семантическая структура глагола в современном английском языке Текст. /А.К.Корсаков - Одесса: ОГУ, 1982.
- Korsakov A.K. Theoretical Foundations of Modern English Grammar. Part I. Syntax. – Manuscript. – Odessa University, 1982. – 324 p.
- Korsakov A.K. Theoretical Foundations of Modern English Grammar. Part II. Morphology. – Manuscript. – Odessa University, 1984. – 372 p.
- Korsakov A.K., Igropulu V. Greek-Russian Conversations / Греческо-русские диалоги. - Athens, 1994.
- Korsakov A.K., Igropulu V. Greek Language Guide. - Athens, 1997.
- Korsakov A.K. A Grammar of the Greek Language. - Athens, 1999. - 173 p.
