= Andrey Turchak =

Russian politician (born 1975)

- Андрей Турчак
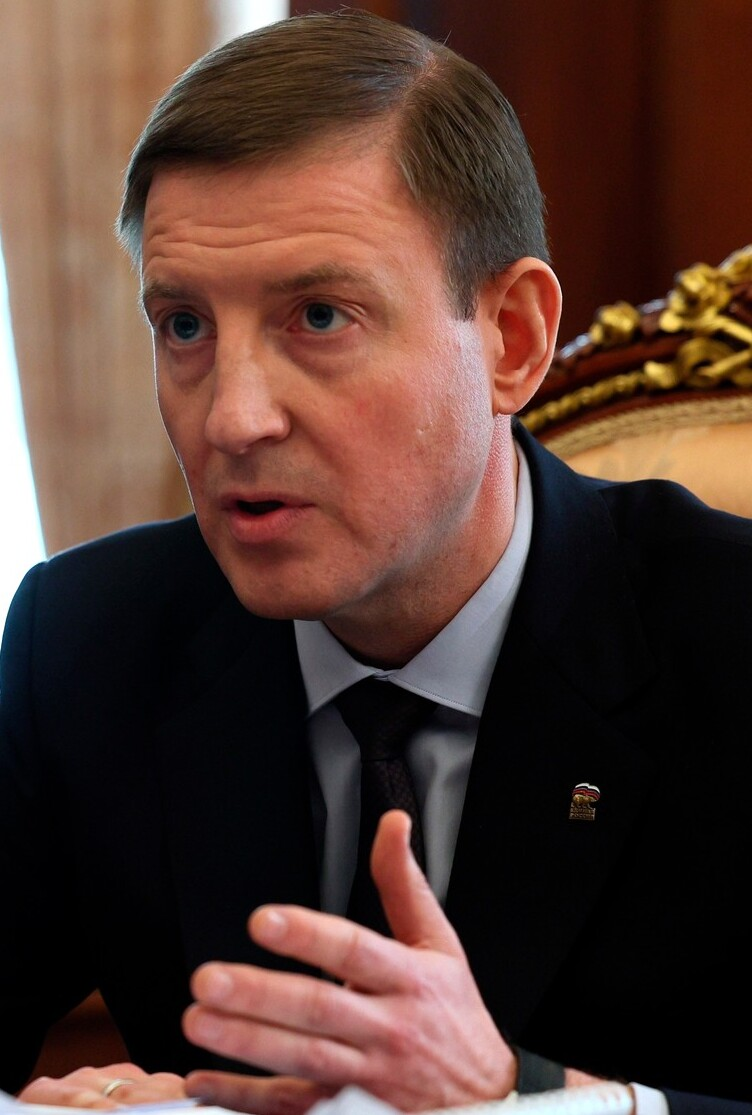
- Turchak in 2023

Head of the Altai Republic
- Incumbent
- Assumed office 3 October 2024
- President: Vladimir Putin
- Preceded by: Oleg Khorokhordin

Senator from Pskov Oblast
- In office 2 November 2017 – 4 June 2024
- Preceded by: Aleksandr Borisov
- Succeeded by: Natalya Melnikova
- In office 6 July 2007 – 16 February 2009
- Preceded by: Nikolay Medvedev
- Succeeded by: Aleksandr Borisov

Secretary of the General Council of the United Russia
- In office 12 October 2017 – 15 June 2024
- Chairman: Dmitry Medvedev
- Preceded by: Sergey Neverov
- Succeeded by: Vladimir Yakushev

Governor of Pskov Oblast
- In office 27 February 2009 – 12 October 2017

Chairman of the Young Guard of United Russia
- In office 12 April 2007 – 10 October 2008
- Preceded by: Tatiana Voronova
- Succeeded by: Artem Turov

Personal details
- Born: 20 December 1975 (age 50) Leningrad, Russian SFSR, Soviet Union
- Party: United Russia
- Education: Saint Petersburg State University of Aerospace Instrumentation

Andrey Anatolyevich Turchak (Russian: Андрей Анатольевич Турчак; born 20 December 1975) is a Russian politician who currently serves as Head of the Altai Republic since 3 October 2024.

He has also served as Secretary of the General Council of United Russia from 12 October 2017 to 15 June 2024.

Previously, he was the fifth Governor of Pskov Oblast (2009–2017) and Senator from Pskov Oblast (2017–2024, 2007–2009), as well as First Vice Speaker of the Federation Council (2020–2024). By being appointed as Governor at the age of 33, he became one of Russia's youngest governors.

In 2013, Alexei Navalny released documents showing that Turchak had neglected to declare a $1.7 million villa that he had purchased in France, an illegal omission under Russian law.

In 2015, journalist Oleg Kashin accused Turchak of ordering an attack which left Kashin in a coma with a fractured skull. Kashin alleged that Turchak arranged the attack in response to a critical blog post. In this blog post, in particular, Kashin called him "shitty Turchak".

Turchak has been an ardent supporter of Vladimir Putin. In March 2022, Turchak accused former Russian Vice Premier and current President of FIDE Arkady Dvorkovich of 'national betrayal' and called for his “immediate dismissal in disgrace”, saying: "This is nothing but the very national betrayal, the behavior of the fifth column, which the president [of Russia] spoke about today”, after Dvorkovich had criticized the 2022 Russian invasion of Ukraine and said his thoughts are 'with Ukrainian civilians'.

In early May 2022, Turchak visited the Russian-occupied city of Mariupol, taking part in the unveiling of a statue of an old woman holding the Soviet flag.

In May 2022, he visited occupied Kherson and said: "I would like, once again, to say to residents of the Kherson region that Russia is here forever. There should be no doubt about that." Ukrainian forces recaptured Kherson in early November 2022.

In July 2022, Turchak visited the eastern Ukrainian city of Kupiansk, which had recently been captured by Russian troops. “Clearly, Russia is here forever,” Turchak said, speaking to the camera. Ukrainian forces recaptured Kupiansk in early September 2022.

On 7 September 2022, Turchak stated that it "would be right and symbolic" to hold the annexation referendums in Russian-occupied Ukraine on 4 November, Russia's Unity Day.

In the 2024 Altai head election, Turchak was elected with 74% of the vote.

== Sanctions ==
He was sanctioned by the UK government in 2022 in relation to the Russo-Ukrainian War.

== Family ==
His wife, Kira Yevgenyevna Turchak (née Petrochenko, born 1976), chairs the board of directors of the management company Leninets, serves on the boards of several other companies, and is the general director of OAO Labirint, which operates the Obuhoff hotel. With an income of 21.08 million rubles in 2010, she ranked among the ten wealthiest wives of regional governors. Her declared income amounted to 38 million rubles in 2015, 33 million rubles in 2017, and 59.4 million rubles in 2018.

They have four children: Anatoly (born 1996), Olga (born 1998), an actress, Sofia (born 2002), and Philipp (born 2009).
