= Larisa Luppian =

Russian actress

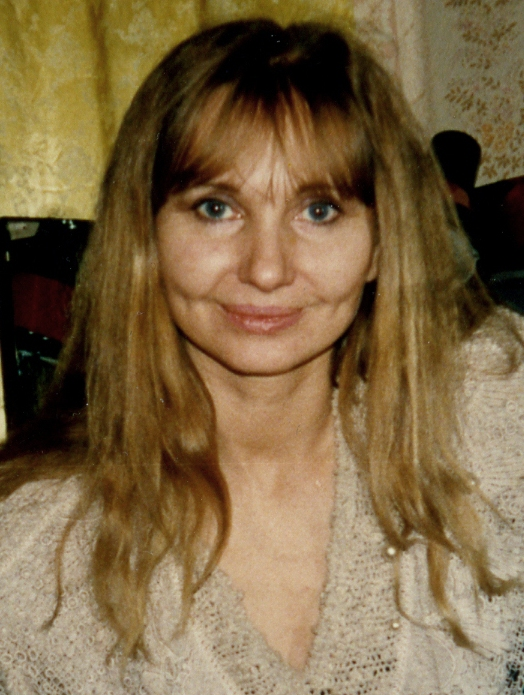
- Born: Larisa Reginaldovna Luppian; 26 January 1953 (age 72); Tashkent, Uzbek SSR, Soviet Union
- Occupation: Actress
- Title: People's Artist of Russia (1999)
- Spouse: Mikhail Boyarsky
- Children: 2, including Elizaveta Boyarskaya

Larisa Reginaldovna Luppian (Russian: Лариса Регинальдовна Луппиан; born 26 January 1953) is a Russian stage and film actress. She was awarded People's Artist of Russia in 1999. She has served as the artistic director of the Lensovet Theatre in St Petersburg since 2019.

== Biography ==
Luppian was born on 26 January 1953 in Tashkent. Her grandfather taught in Tashkent at a military school, and her grandmother worked as a general's governess. Her mother from the Volga, ended up in Tashkent in connection with admission to a medical institute. Luppian was raised by her Estonian grandmother, who tried to speak German with her. After the separation of her parents, Luppian and her mother moved to the city of Chirchiq. There, she went to kindergarten, participated in all sorts of New Year's performances, and even once played the Snow Maiden. When she was seven years old, her parents got back together, and the family again ended up in Tashkent.

Luppian got her first experience in cinema when she was in the second grade; she starred at the Tashkent Film Studio in the film You Are Not an Orphan. In 1974, she graduated from LGITMiK (now called the Russian State Institute of Performing Arts) and came to the Lensovet Theatre. In 1986-1988 she worked at the Leningrad Theatre (now called the Baltic House Festival Theatre), then returned to the Lensovet Theatre. Luppian hosted the TV program "Theatrical Binoculars".

Since 21 May 2019 Luppian has been artistic director of Lensovet Theatre.

== Personal life ==
Luppian is married to Mikhail Boyarsky. They have a son Sergey Boyarsky (born in 1980), and a daughter, Elizaveta Boyarskaya (born 20 December 1985) as well as four grandchildren.
