= Vera Korsakova (politician) =

Russian leatherworker and politician (1920–2022)

- Вера Корсакова

Member of the Supreme Soviet of the Russian SFSR
- In office 1959–1963

Personal details
- Born: Vera Vasilyevna Korsakova; 17 October 1920 Lipovka, Smolensk Governorate, Russian SFSR
- Died: November 2022 (aged 102) Novosibirsk, Russia
- Party: CPSU
- Occupation: Leatherworker

Vera Vasilyevna Korsakova (Russian: Вера Васильевна Корсакова; 17 October 1920 – November 2022) was a Soviet and Russian politician. A member of the Communist Party, she served in the Supreme Soviet of the Russian SFSR from 1959 to 1963.

Korsakova died in November 2022, at the age of 102.
