= Siberian State Technological University =

Technical university in Krasnoyarsk, Russia

Coordinates: 56.0126°N 92.8689°E

- Сибирский государственный технологический университет
- Established: 1930
- Academic staff: 1,051 lecturers and teachers
- Students: 15,000
- Location: Krasnoyarsk, Russia
- Website: http://www.sibstu.kts.ru Building details
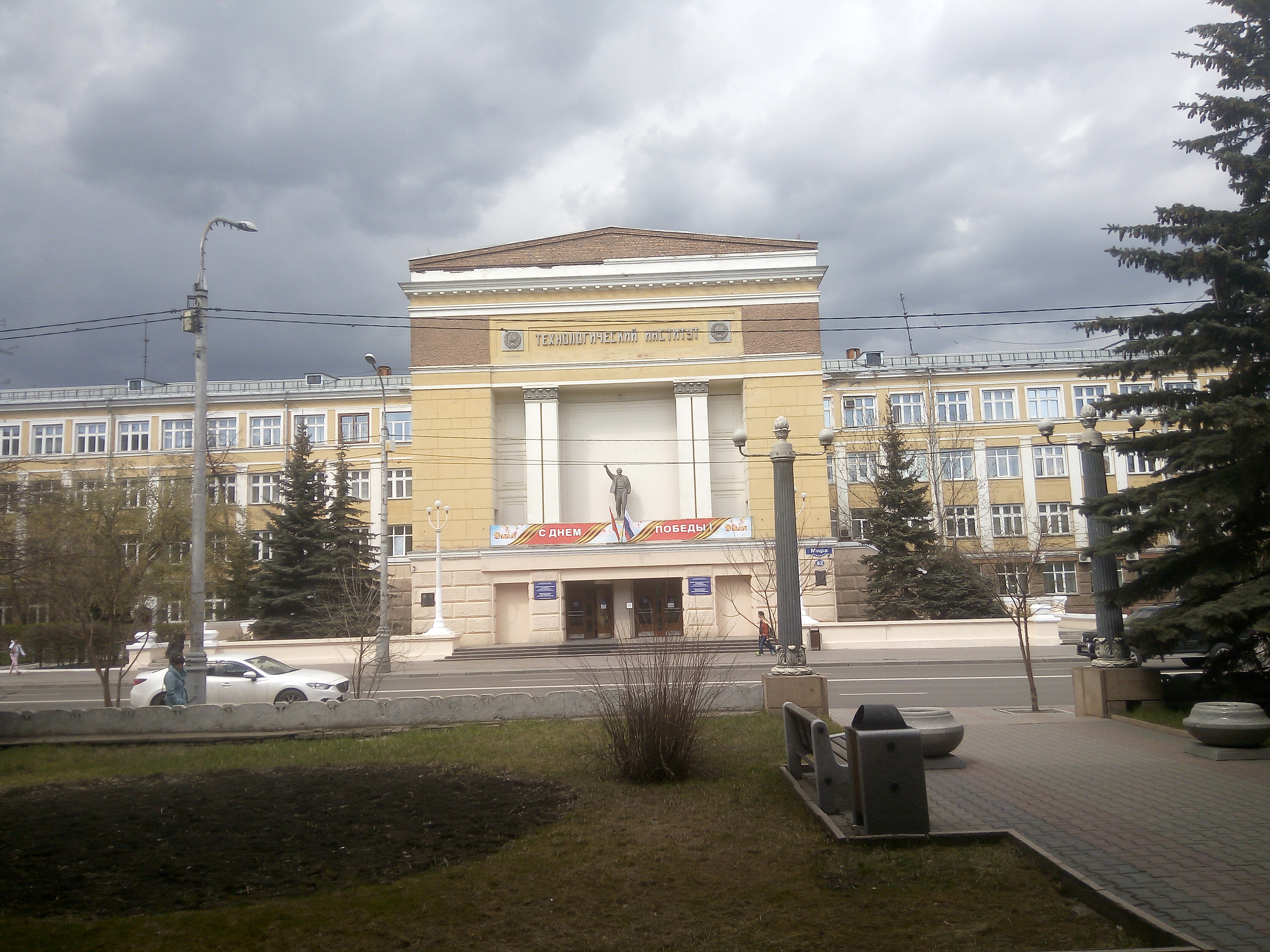

Siberian State Technological University in Krasnoyarsk, Russia was established in 1930 as the Siberian Institute of Forest (Сибирский лесотехнический институт). Later it was known as the Siberian Technical Institute of Forest (Сибирский лесотехнический институт) (renamed 1933), Siberian Technological Institute (Сибирский технологический институт) (renamed 1958), Krasnoyarsk State Technological Academy (Красноярская государственная технологическая академия) (renamed 1994) and finally the Siberian State Technological University (renamed 1997). Currently 15,000 students are studying in one of the nine faculties.

== See also ==
- List of forestry universities and colleges
