= State University of Non-Ferrous Metals and Gold =

- Russian: Государственный университет цветных металлов и золота
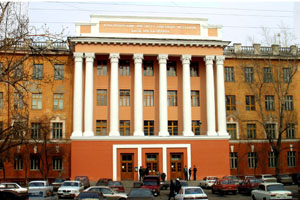
- Type: Public
- Active: 1930–2006
- Location: Moscow and Krasnoyarsk, Russia
- Campus: Urban

State University of Non-Ferrous Metals and Gold (Russian: Государственный университет цветных металлов и золота) is a public university in Russia existed in 1930–1958 in Moscow, 1958–2006 in Krasnoyarsk. The university joined the Siberian Federal University in 2006.

== History ==
The university was founded on April 17, 1930 (by order of the Supreme Council of the National Economy of the USSR No. 1238) on the basis of the Faculty of Non-Ferrous Metallurgy of the Moscow Mining Academy as the Moscow Institute of Non-Ferrous Metals and Gold. On May 7, 1940, by the Decree of the Presidium of the Supreme Soviet of the USSR, the Moscow Institute of Non-Ferrous Metals and Gold was named after M. I. Kalinin.

In December 1958, by decision of the Council of Ministers of the USSR, the institute was transferred to Krasnoyarsk and renamed the Krasnoyarsk Institute of Non-Ferrous Metals. In 1994, the institute was renamed the Krasnoyarsk Academy of Non-Ferrous Metals and Gold.

By 1998, the academy included four institutes and four faculties, which provide training in thirty-four specialties. It had 4,100 students, including 1,200 part-time students. In 2004, the academy was given the status of a university.

On November 8, 2006, the Government of the Russian Federation established the Siberian Federal University. The State University of Non-Ferrous Metals and Gold became a part of it.

== Literature ==
- Большой энциклопедический словарь Красноярского края [Great Encyclopedic Dictionary of the Krasnoyarsk Krai] / гл. ред. А. П. Статейнов. Красноярск : Буква С, 2010. Т. 2 : [Административно-территориальное деление. Населенные пункты. Предприятия и организации]. p. 76. 515 p. (in Russian).
