= Lensovet Theatre =

Theatre in Leningrad, Russia

Coordinates: 59.9301°N 30.3481°E

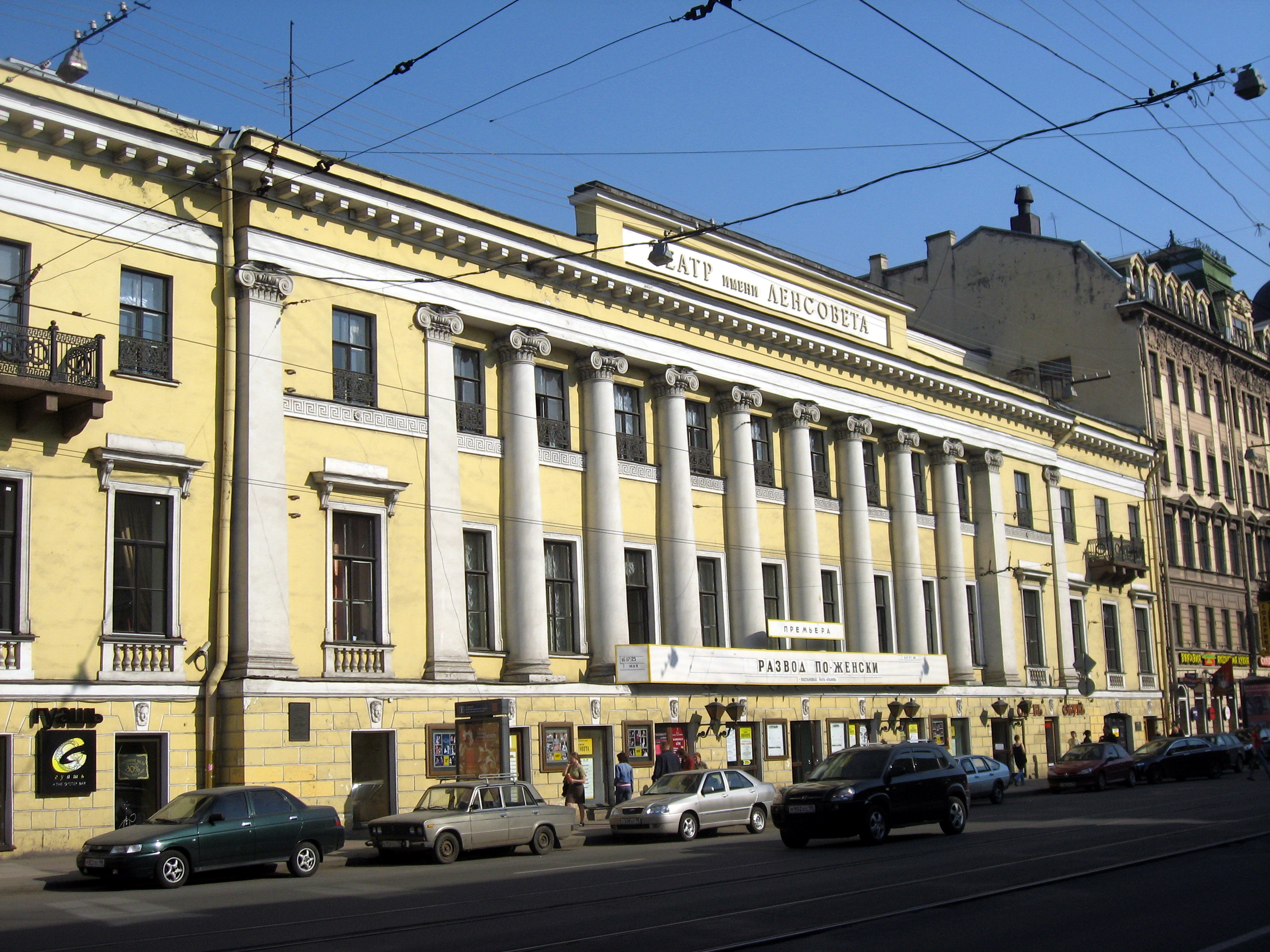
Lensovet Theatre

Lensovet Theatre, officially Saint Petersburg State Academic Lensoviet Theatre (in Russian: Санкт-Петербургский академический театр имении Ленсовета, literally St Petersburg Academic Theater of the Leningrad City Council), also known as Lensovet Academic Theatre and Lensoviet Theatre, is a theatre and theatrical troupe in Saint Petersburg, Russia.

== History of the theatre company ==
The resident company was founded as the New Theatre in 1933, under V. E. Meyerhold student Isaac (Isaak) Kroll. As government repression arose against "Meyerholdism" in the mid-1930s, Kroll was dismissed and actor, director and teacher Boris Mikhailovich Sushkevich appointed. Sushkevich brought his disciples with him to the company. It was later renamed Leningrad Soviet Theatre.

The troupe's first home was in a building acquired by the Lensovet on Nevsky Prospekt, which formerly housed a Dutch church; however, this was destroyed by fire. In 1936 the city authorities gave the city council a new premises on Rubinshteina Street (which now houses a children's theatre, Through the Looking Glass).

When Nazi Germany invaded the Soviet Union in 1941, most of the theatre troupe (then New Theatre), was on tour in the Soviet Far East; the others joined them there to escape the siege of Leningrad by the Germans.

They returned in 1945, moving into their current location at 12 Vladimirski Prospekt. Sushkevich died a year later, after which there was a frequently changing succession of artistic directors. Under Nikolay Akimov, who served from around 1949 to 1955, new actors were brought in and the repertoire was updated. The first Soviet musical, Spring in Moscow, by Viktor Gusev, was staged. In 1953 the theatre was renamed. The name derives from Leningrad Council of People Deputies, or Lensovet, which was succeeded by the Legislative Assembly of Saint Petersburg in 1994.

In 1960, Igor Petrovich Vladimirov, a student of Georgy Tovstonogov, took up the post as director, where he remained until his death in 1996. During his time there he opened a small stage. After his death, Vladislav Borisovich Pazi was appointed director.

Under Pazi, the Russian musical Vladimirskaya Ploshchad as well as the Broadway hit Cabaret were staged. Young artists such as Konstantin Khabensky, Mikhail Porechenkov, Andrei Zibrov, and many others were recruited, and performances began to participate in festivals and to win awards.

Pazi died in 2006 and was succeeded by Harold Strelkov, and Yuri Butusov took his place in 2011. He was succeeded by Larisa Luppian in 2019.

== History of the building ==
The theatre building is located at 12 Vladimirski Prospekt, the historic neoclassical mansion built in 1920 (1828?) for the family of a rich businessman called Korsakov. The heir, Sofya Alekseevna Korsakova, married Prince V. Golitsyn. After the prince got into debt, the house had to be sold, and turned into a gambling house. After the Russian Revolution of 1917, the building was sold to the Culture Commissariat, headed by A. V. Lunacharsky. After some time it was turned into a "revolutionary theatre", which staged amateur performances, before being refitted with a large stage and a more formal theatre created.

The building was nationalised and maintained by the Soviet government, some renovations and reconstructions of the interiors and facade were done from the 1930s through to the 1980s. In 1953, it was named the Lensoviet Academic Theatre (or Leningrad Soviet), and became one of Leningrad's most famous theatres.

The renovated building is owned by the City of Saint Petersburg.

== Performances ==
The first performance by the company was of the play Mad Money, by A. N. Ostrovsky. The troupe was headed by V.E. Meyerhold Isaac Kroll.

== Directors ==
- Isaak Kroll (1933–1937)
- Boris Sushkevich (1937–1946)
- Nikolay Akimov (1949–1955)
- Igor Vladimirov (1960–1996)
- Vladislav Pazi (1996–2006)
- Yuri Butusov (1996–2017)
- Larisa Luppian (2019– current)

== Actors ==
- Alisa Freindlich (1961–1982)
- Georgiy Zhzhonov (1958–1968)
- Alexei Petrenko (1958–1971)
- Igor Vladimirov (1960–1996)
- Mikhail Boyarsky (1972–?)
- Petr Shelokhonov (1982–1992)
- Yelena Solovey (1985–1991)
- Konstantin Khabensky (1997–2000)
- Mikhail Porechenkov (1995–1997)
- Anna Kovalchuk (1998–?)
- Andrei Zibrov (1997–?)
- Larisa Luppian (1975– )
- Semion Strugachev (1988–?)
