= Northwestern Management Institute =

Soviet university

Leningrad Communist University or LKU (Russian: ЛКУ) was a Soviet teaching establishment designed to create cadres for Party and government work.

Created in 1918 as the Zinoviev Worker-Peasant University (Russian: Рабоче-Крестьянский Университет имени Зиновьева), it was renamed in 1921 the Zinoviev Communist University (Russian: Коммунистический Университет имени Зиновьева) and in 1929 the All-Union Stalin Communist University (Russian: Всесоюзный коммунистический университет имени Сталина). It was the first educational establishment in Russia to teach criminal investigation. In 1932 it became the Stalin National High Communist Agricultural University, "the Party smithy of cadres for the socialist village." During the 1933-34 academic year, about 1,200 students were being trained to serve as kolkhoz chairmen and MTS directors.

In 1944 it was reorganized as part of the Leningrad Higher Party School.

== Bibliography ==
- Igal Halfin, Stalinist Confessions: Messianism and Terror at the Leningrad Communist University, University of Pittsburgh Press, 2009: ISBN 0-8229-6016-8
- I.V. Znamenskaya and M.A. Rumyantsev, "Kommunisticheskii universitet imeni Zinov'eva (Leningrad)," Istoki 1 (1989): 335-338.

== See also ==
- List of modern universities in Europe (1801–1945)
