= Sugul =

Sugul Сугул
- Village
- Location within Altai Republic Location within Russia
- Coordinates: 51°56′N 86°16′E
- Country: Russia
- Region: Altai Republic
- District: Choysky District
- Time zone: UTC+7:00

Sugul (Russian: Сугул; Altay: Сугул) is a rural locality (a selo) in Paspaulskoye Rural Settlement of Choysky District, the Altai Republic, Russia. The population was 63 as of 2016. There are 3 streets.

== Geography ==
Sugul is located east from Gorno-Altaysk, in the valley of the Paspaul River, 25 km southwest of Choya (the district's administrative centre) by road. Paspaul is the nearest rural locality.
