= Natalia Polosmak =

Russian archaeologist

Natalia Viktorovna Polosmak (Russian: Наталья Викторовна Полосьмак; born 12 September 1956) is a Russian archaeologist specialising in the study of early Metal Age Eurasian nomads, especially those known as the Pazyryk Culture, an ancient people, often glossed as "Scythian", who lived in the Altay Mountains in Siberian Russia. She is best known for her discovery and analysis of the Ice Maiden mummy which is now the focus of an ethnic political debate between Russian scientists and the Altay people living there.

== Work ==
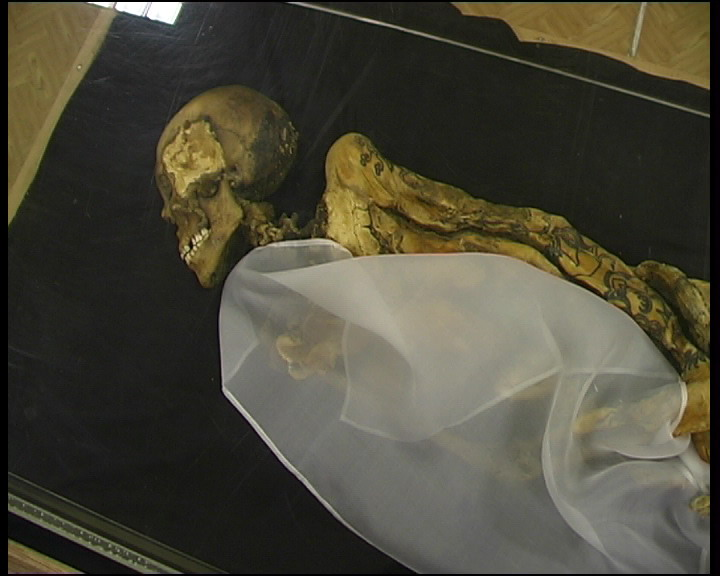
Siberian Ice Maiden mummy - 5th century BCE

In 1993, Polosmak was conducting archaeological reconnaissance of the high and barren Ukok Plateau when she discovered a spectacular archaeological find; a female mummy frozen in permafrost which she associated with the Pazyryk on the basis of intact clothing remaining on the well-preserved corpse. The Pazyryk were an Iron Age people who lived in the Altay Mountains and on the Ukok Plateau. Many tomb mounds (kurgans) have been found in the area and have been associated with the Pazyryk culture; a group that closely resembled that of the legendary Scythian people to the west. The term kurgan is in general usage to describe the barrow burials found in the area. Excavations of this site yielded fascinating archaeological artifacts.

This famous find by Natalia Polosmak is known as the Ice Maiden. She discovered the mummy in an ancient, and previously undisturbed, burial mound. The mummy was unusual in that it was a woman interred with full ceremonial honors; a rare distinction for a woman at that time. The mummy was intricately tattooed and is estimated to date back to the 5th century BCE. She was beautifully dressed with a black felt headdress which was found intact and decorated with figures that indicated her high social status. She wore a necklace of wooden camels and high boots of leather. Her dress was of woven camel hair and sheep's wool with braided tassels and colored red with insect dye. More tattooed mummies (c. 300 BC) were also extracted from the permafrost at the site.

While Polosmak and her team were excavating the site and defrosting the artifacts with water from a nearby lake heated with blow torches, rumors circulated among the indigenous Ukok people that disturbing the dead would have dire consequences. The engine of the helicopter that Polosmak used to fly the remains of the maiden to Russia failed, resulting in an emergency landing and some damage to the Ice Maiden for lack of refrigeration. This was taken as a sign that the maiden did not like being disturbed. An earthquake which occurred in the Altay in September 2003 was also seen as bad fortune linked to disturbing the dead.

== Ice Maiden controversy ==
From the beginning, there was controversy over the ownership of the Ice Maiden and other archaeological finds which were found just within a disputed strip of land between Russia and China and were moved by Polosmak and Russian officials to Novosibirsk and Moscow for proper, scientific research under controlled laboratory conditions. The indigenous residents of this area, known as the Altay Republic, demanded the return of the burial artifacts from their Russian locations, claiming the ancient remains should never have been disturbed and that they belong at the site where they were found.

Rima Eriknova, a native Altayan and Director of the Altay Regional Museum in Gorno-Altaysk, a leader of the group that has called for the return of the artifacts, said she was offended that the site was excavated and valuable artifacts, including the mummy, removed without the knowledge of or permission from local people in nearby villages. She believes that the Ice Maiden belongs to the people of Altay and that Russian forensic findings are suspect and an attempt to erase local heritage. She has been quoted as saying "...they made the Ice Maiden completely European. But, in fact, she also has Mongolian features. They said she does not belong to our culture."

This controversy results from conflicting elements: scientific evidence provided by genetics regarding the Ice Maiden's genotype that suggest she was not an ancestor of the people now living there versus the claim of the indigenous Altayans that the mummy is Altayan because she was found in the Altay and is, thus, part of their heritage; scientific findings having no bearing on the matter from their point of view.

A ban was placed on Russian archaeologists in the Altai, including Polosmak, who were prevented from working at the excavated grave-sites on the Ukok Plateau. Polosmak expressed her pain regarding the ban since, in the years following the discovery of the "Ice Maiden," she had made the area and her archaeological studies there her life's work. On 20 September 2012, the "Ice Maiden" was brought to Anokhin Museum in the Altai from Novosibirsk, where it was previously held.

== Articles by Polosmak ==
- The First Report on a Burial of a Noble Pazyryk Woman on the Ukok Plateau
- Van Noten, Francis; Polosmak, Natalia (1995), "The frozen tombs of the Scythians", Endeavour, 19 (2): 76, doi:10.1016/0160-9327(95)93588-6

== See also ==
- Tarim mummies
- Pazyryk culture
- Siberian Ice Maiden
