= Ice Maiden =

Ice Maiden may refer to:

- Mummy Juanita, an Inca mummy
- Siberian Ice Maiden, a Pazyryk body found mummified in Siberia
- Icemaiden, a DC comic book superheroine who later went by the name Glacier
- The Ice-Maiden, an 1861 story by Hans Christian Andersen
- The Ice Maiden, a 2002 novel by Edna Buchanan
- Ice Maiden, a 2011 novel by Sally Prue
- Ice Maiden Expedition, a 2017–2018 British Army expedition to Antarctica
- Susie Wiles, chief of staff of 47th president-elect of the United States Donald Trump
- Ice Maiden, a 2024 documentary about Lisa Blair
