= Pazyryk =

Pazyryk may refer to:

- Pazyryk Valley, a valley of Ukok Plateau, Siberia
- The Iron Age Pazyryk burials found there
- The wider Pazyryk culture, the archaeological culture associated with the burials
