= Snow Maiden (disambiguation) =

Snegurochka is a character in Russian fairy tales.

Snow Maiden may also refer to:

- "Snowmaiden", a song on the Amberian Dawn album The Clouds of Northland Thunder
- Yuki-onna, a Japanese legendary creature
- Rhaphiolepis indica, an ornamental plant

== See also ==
- The Snow Maiden (disambiguation)
- Snegurochka (disambiguation)
- Ice Maiden (disambiguation)
