= Siberian Ice Maiden =

Mummified body of a woman from the 5th century BC

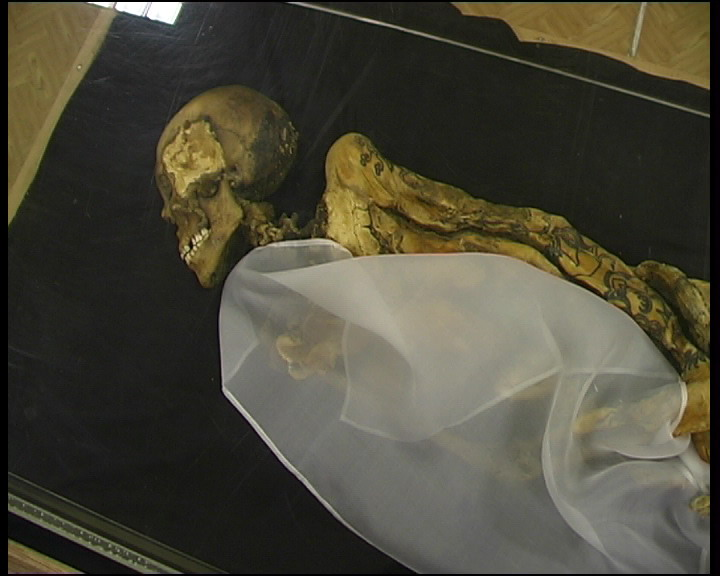
- Mummy of the Siberian Ice Maiden
- Material: Mummified corpse, remains of a burial chamber
- Discovered: Ukok Plateau 49°17′59″N 87°33′46″E

Location
- Siberian Ice Maiden (Continental Asia)

The Siberian Ice Maiden, also known as the Altai Princess or Princess of Ukok, is the naturally preserved mummy of a young woman from the Pazyryk culture who lived during the 5th century BCE. Discovered in 1993 in a frozen kurgan on the Ukok Plateau in the Altai Republic of southern Siberia, Russia, her remains were preserved for approximately 2,400 years by ice that formed within the burial chamber. The burial contained exceptionally well-preserved clothing, tattoos, wooden furnishings, sacrificed horses, and other organic materials that provided rare insights into the culture and mortuary practices of Iron Age nomadic peoples of the Eurasian Steppe.

Since her excavation, the Siberian Ice Maiden has become a prominent symbol of Indigenous Altaian cultural heritage and the subject of debates over archaeology, identity, and the repatriation of human remains. She is currently housed at the Republican National Museum in Gorno-Altaisk.

== Identity and dating ==
Known by several names, including the Altai Princess (Russian: Алтайская принцесса), Princess of Ukok (Russian: Принце́сса Уко́ка), Deva ("Virgin"), and Ochy-bala (Russian: Очы-бала), a heroine of Altaian epic tradition, the woman became widely known in English-language sources as the Siberian Ice Maiden.

She was a member of the Pazyryk culture, a Scytho-Siberian society that occupied parts of the Eurasian Steppe between the 6th and 2nd centuries BCE. Her remains were discovered in a kurgan on the Ukok Plateau in what is now the Altai Republic of southern Siberia, near the borders of Russia, Mongolia, China, and Kazakhstan.

Dendrochronological analysis of the logs used to construct the burial chamber, together with the examination of organic material recovered from the stomachs of horses buried alongside her, indicated that she was interred during the spring of the 5th century BCE. Preserved within the frozen burial chamber, her remains lay undisturbed for approximately 2,400 years until their excavation in 1993. At the time of her death, she was estimated to have been between 20 and 30 years old.

== Discovery and excavation ==
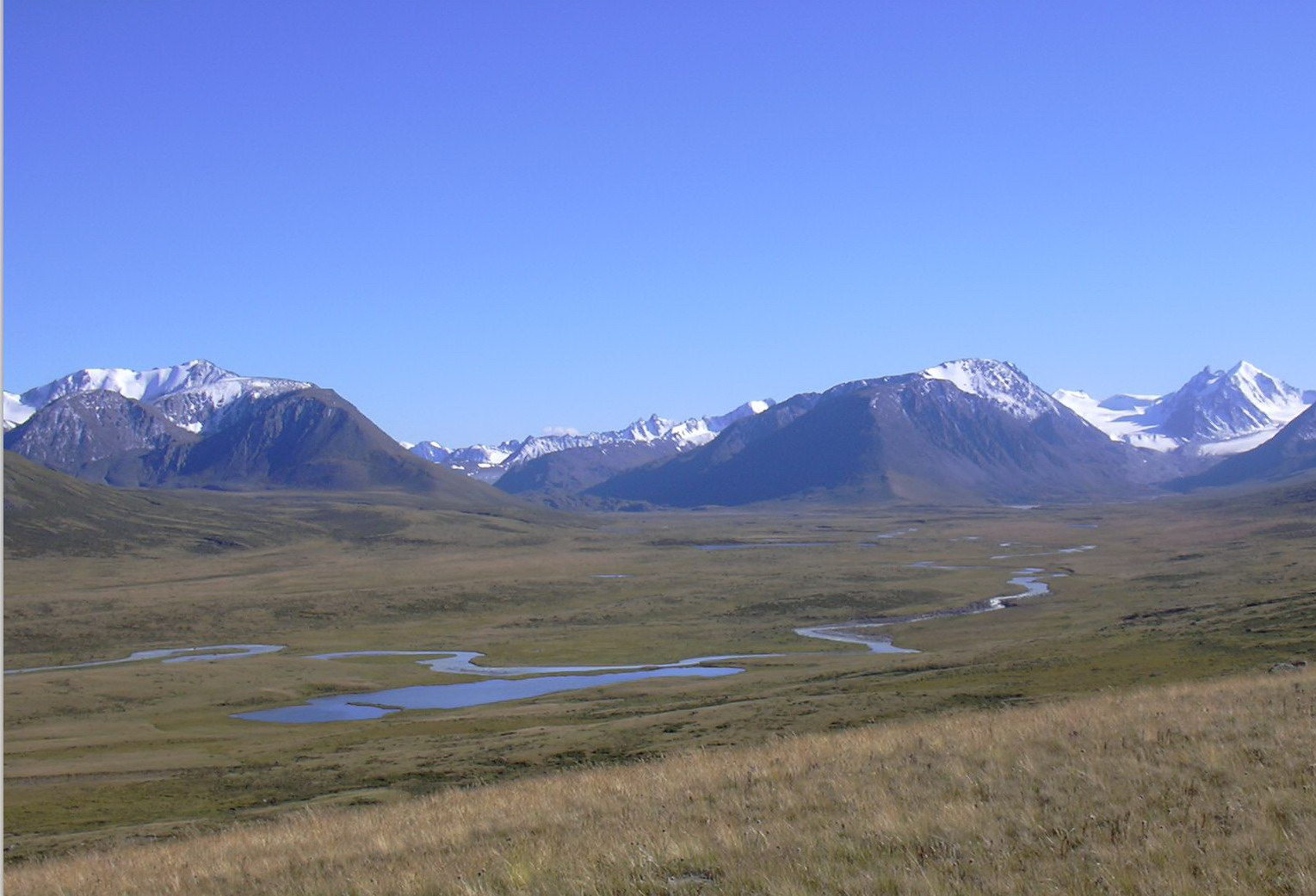
The Ukok Plateau

During the summer of 1993, archaeologist Natalia Polosmak and her team from the Russian Institute of Archaeology and Ethnography discovered the woman's burial on the Ukok Plateau in what is now the Altai Republic of southern Siberia. It was Polosmak's fourth field season in the region, where the institute was investigating the early habitation of southern Siberia.

Guided by border guard Mikhail Chepanov, the expedition investigated a group of kurgans located in a disputed strip of territory near the border between Russia and China. Before reaching the woman's tomb, the team encountered a later burial that had been placed above the original chamber. The secondary burial contained a skeleton in a stone-and-wood coffin together with three horses. According to Polosmak, it may have belonged to people from outside the Pazyryk culture who regarded burial within an existing kurgan as an honour.

Excavation of the overlying burial eventually revealed the woman's tomb below. A robber's shaft dug into the later grave had provided a route through which water and snow entered the older chamber. This sequence of events contributed to the formation of the frozen conditions that preserved her remains and grave goods for approximately 2,400 years until their discovery in 1993.

== Condition and preservation ==
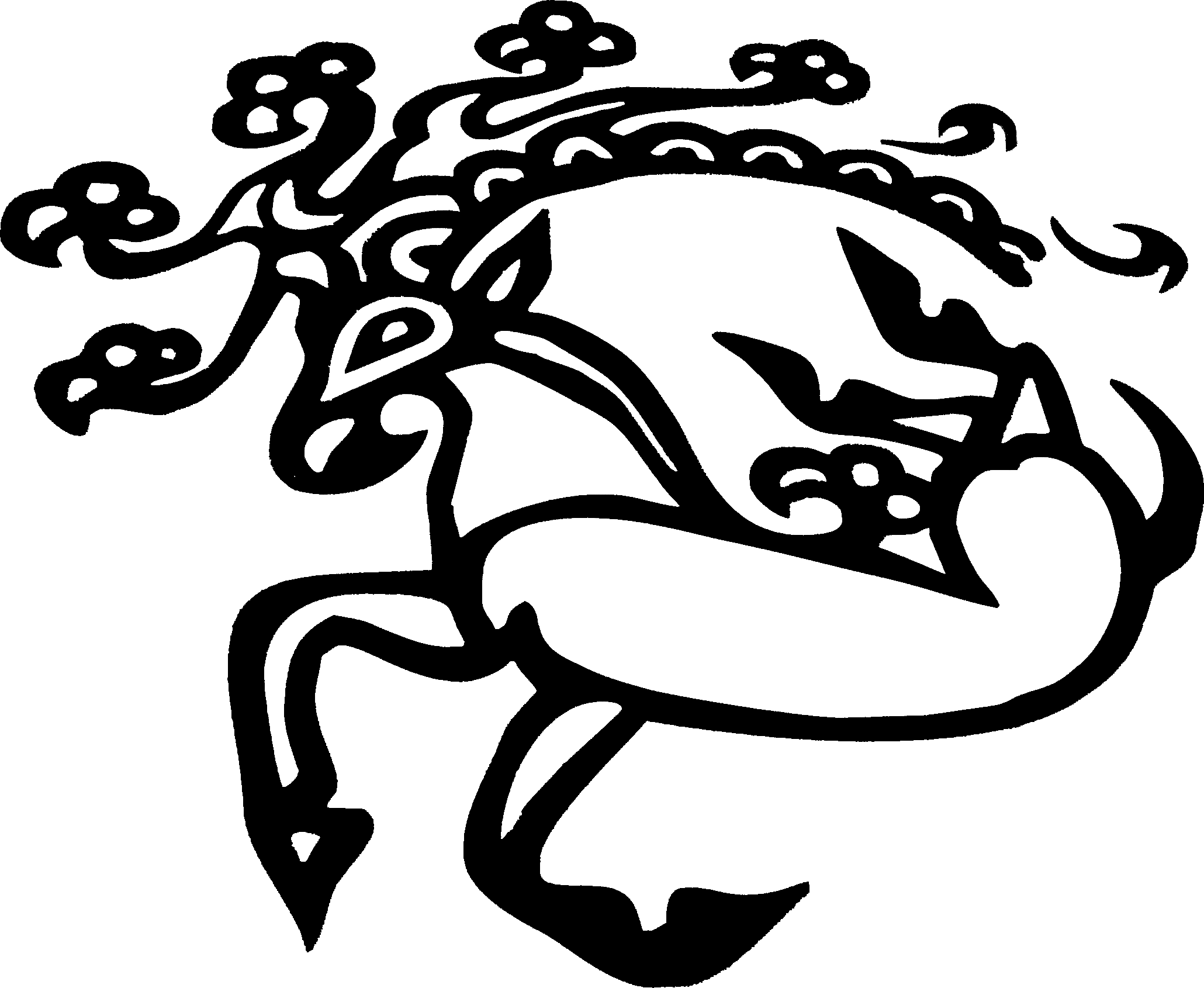
Tattoo motif on the arm of the Siberian Ice Maiden.

The woman's remains were preserved by frozen conditions within her burial chamber. After a later burial was placed above the original tomb, water and snow entered the chamber through a robber's shaft and collected around the coffin. The water subsequently froze, forming an ice block that encased the burial. Because the chamber remained frozen beneath layers of stone and permafrost, her body, clothing, and grave goods survived for approximately 2,400 years after her interment in the 5th century BCE.

The frozen conditions preserved a wide range of organic materials that rarely survive in archaeological contexts. Her clothing, wooden furnishings, food offerings, and other grave goods remained largely intact. Her skin was also preserved, including animal-style deer tattoos on her shoulder, wrist, and thumb.

== Associated objects and clothing ==
=== Burial furnishings and offerings ===
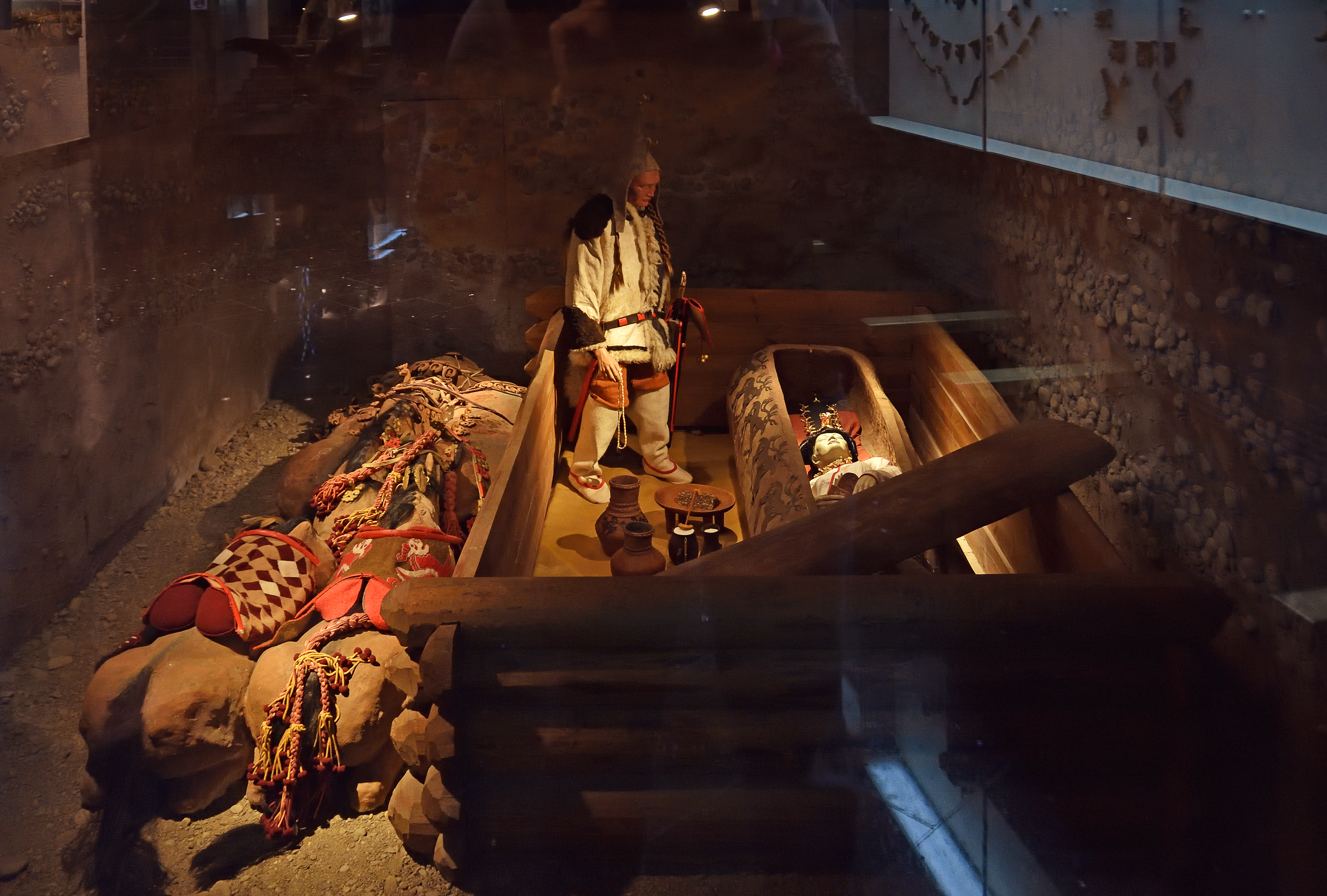
Reconstruction of the tomb chamber of the Siberian Ice Maiden, in the Anokhin Museum.

The woman was buried in a log coffin carved from a single larch tree trunk and decorated with leather appliqués depicting deer. Inside the burial chamber were two small wooden tables with tray-shaped tops and removable legs.

Food and drink had been placed in the chamber. Horsemeat and mutton were laid on the tables, and a wooden vessel with a carved handle and stirrer contained the residue of a dairy product. An unidentified beverage was placed in a vessel made from yak horn. The horn showed signs of wear and repair, indicating that it had been used before it was placed in the burial.

A small stone dish containing coriander seeds was also found in the burial.

=== Clothing ===
The woman's clothing survived largely intact, providing rare evidence of how women of the Pazyryk culture in the Altai dressed during the 5th century BCE. She wore a knee-length yellow shirt made from tussah, or wild silk, a long woollen skirt, and high white felt stocking-boots decorated with red appliqué.

The skirt measured 144 cm (4 ft 9 in) long, 90 cm (35 in) wide at the top and 112.5 cm (44.3 in) wide at the bottom. It was made from three horizontal bands of wool in different shades of red, with a scarlet upper band and a deep burgundy lower band. The paler middle band initially appeared to be undyed, but physical and chemical analysis found that it had been dyed red using a weaker concentration of the dyes found in the other bands. The skirt was secured with a thick plaited woollen cord ending in tassels, which allowed it to be worn at different heights on the body.

Pazyryk women's shirts were lightweight, knee-length garments with long sleeves and round necklines trimmed in red. The preserved shirts from Pazyryk burials were made from tussah silk or cotton. Polosmak identified these as the earliest known examples of tussah silk of non-Chinese origin and proposed areas south of modern China or Assam in present-day India as possible places of manufacture.

=== Grave goods ===
The woman wore an elaborate wig and headdress. Her head had been shaved, and the wig was constructed on a close-fitting felt cap with two layers of hair sewn onto it. A black moulding material placed between the layers gave the wig its shape and volume. Analysis identified carbonised grain husks, soot-like particles, animal fat and clay among its components.

A lock of the woman's own hair at the top of her head was wrapped in felt and tightly bound with woollen cord so that it stood upright. The bundle was enclosed in a casing of red wool and secured with a bronze hairpin topped by a carved wooden deer standing on a sphere. The deer was covered with gold foil.

A high-peaked hat measuring 84 cm (33 in) long was found between the wall of the log coffin and the burial chamber. Another element of the headdress was a leaf-shaped wooden ornament approximately 68.5 cm (27.0 in) long, covered with felt and black cloth. Fifteen carved wooden birds were attached along its length, decreasing in size toward the top. The birds had leather wings, legs and tails and long necks. Polosmak, who led the excavation of the burial, suggested that the birds may represent swans and interpreted the ornament as a representation of the world tree.

Her personal ornaments included small gold earrings and a wooden necklace covered with gold foil and decorated with carved winged snow leopards. At her waist was a felt bag containing a bronze mirror set into a wooden frame carved with a deer. Polosmak later reported that the bronze plate was a fragment of a Chinese mirror that had been inserted into the wooden frame to create a new object.

The bag also contained several paste beads and a few Indian glass beads. Nearby was a horsehair tassel suspended from a string of cylindrical stone beads. Blue powder found beside the tassel was identified as vivianite, a blue mineral pigment. Polosmak interpreted the powder as a cosmetic.

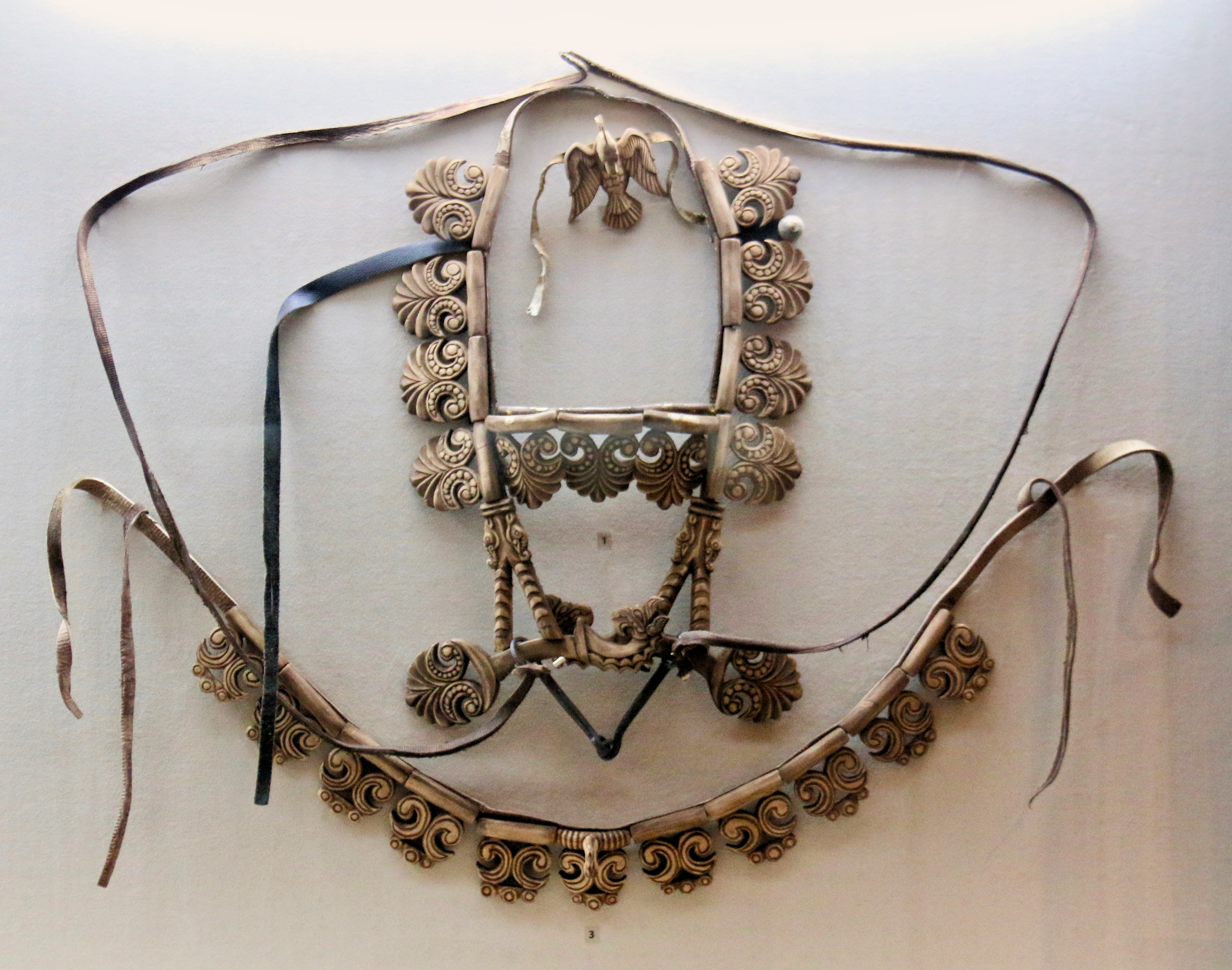
Siberian Ice Maiden horse harness, Anokhin Museum, Gorno-Altaysk, Altai Republic, Siberia, Russia

=== Horses ===
The six horses buried alongside the woman were equipped with decorated harnesses. Five wore bridles with surviving griffin ornaments, including carved figures attached to forehead and nose straps and pendants on the cheek pieces.

== Cause of death ==
The Ice Maiden and her horses were oriented with their heads toward the east, as was the case in other Pazyryk burials. The cause of the Ice Maiden's death was unknown until 2014, when new research suggested breast cancer, combined with injuries sustained in a fall, as likely culprits. The original researcher, Polosmak, stated in a 2004 article, "Probably, for the sick woman, constant inhalation of cannabis vapour became a forced necessity (Polosmak, Trunova, 2004) and she was often in a state of altered consciousness." This created the mistaken belief that the woman was buried with cannabis on her person. However, she was buried with coriander seeds, which were mistaken as cannabis.

== Controversy ==
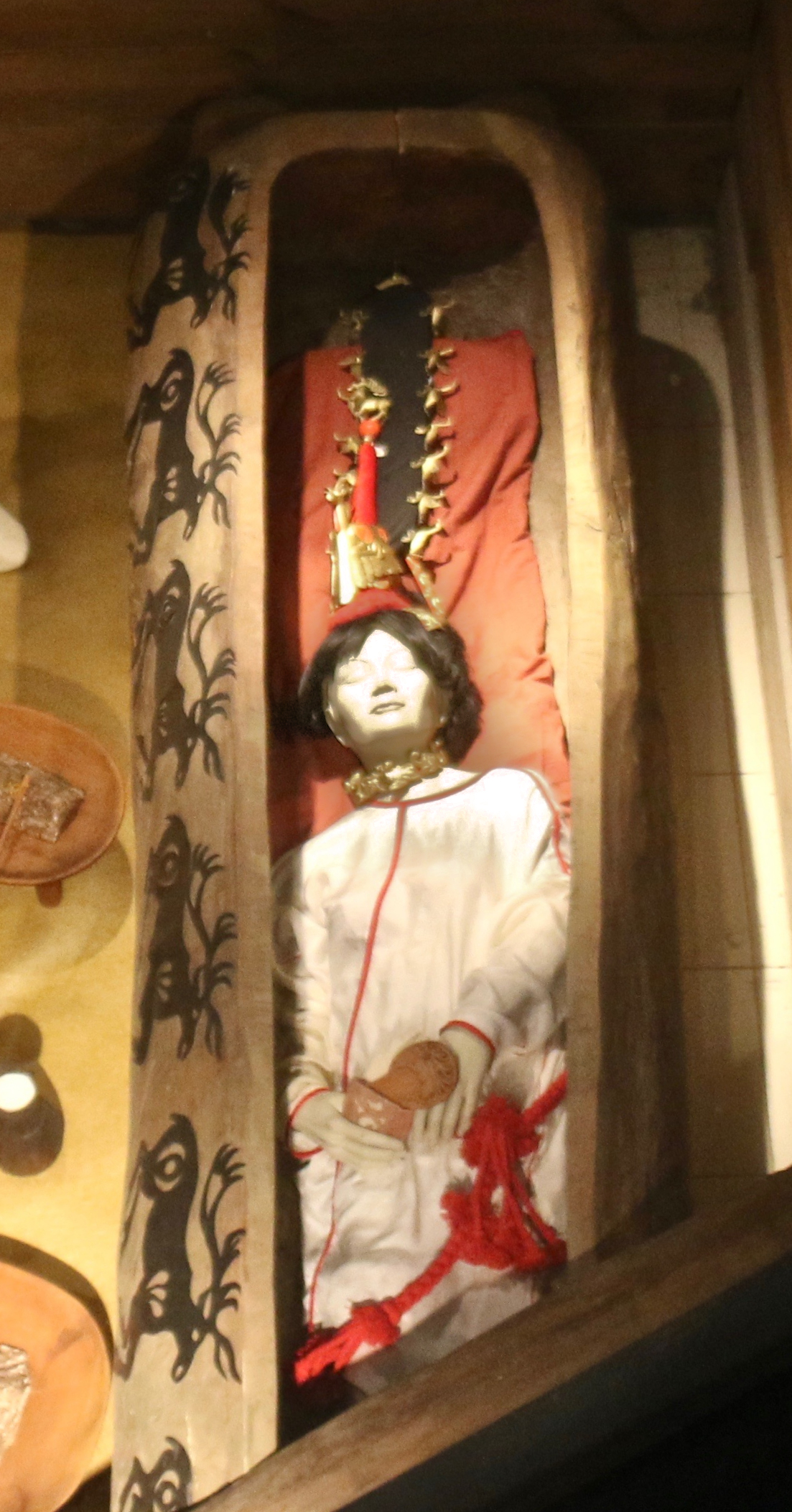
Siberian Ice Maiden inside her wooden sarcophagus (reconstruction from burial, Anokhin Museum).

The excavation of the Ice Maiden was carried out with great care, although the methods used to melt the ice and remove the artifacts and body from the coffin were subject to criticism. The mummy also suffered deterioration during her refrigerated transport from the site to the lab, as the preservation efforts could not prevent the fading of her tattoos.

A dispute developed between the Russian authorities and the local inhabitants regarding the Ice Maiden, as locals mythologised her as the nomadic progenitor of the Altaian people.

Despite efforts by the Russian Federation government to undermine regional political agency and the cultural sovereignty of the Altai, the Ice Maiden became a symbol of Altaian identity. A local journalist described the issue:

Sometimes it is difficult to openly talk about politics, so we use her [the Ice Maiden] as a metaphor to discuss the difficult position of Altaians in Russia. Claiming her is claiming our land.

Subsequent excavations in the area are forbidden at the request of the Altaian people, though it is believed more artifacts and burial mounds are in the area. An archaeologist involved in the excavation expressed fears that the bodies in the mounds, if left unrecovered, will decay due to climate change.

DNA research by the Russian Academy of Sciences found clear differences in the Ice Maiden's genetic material and that of modern Altaian communities, which led archaeologists to claim that the mummy was European and that Altaians were recent migrants to the region. This was used as a reason to keep the mummy in Novosibirsk, and in 2004 the archaeologists who had refused to repatriate the Ice Maiden to the Altai because of her supposed European heritage were awarded the prestigious State Prize of the Russian Federation. Claims regarding the Ice Maiden's European or Altaian descent are, however, considered the products of indigenous Altaian cultural identity and political autonomy being undermined by a broad "Russian" nationalism.

== Return and exhibition ==
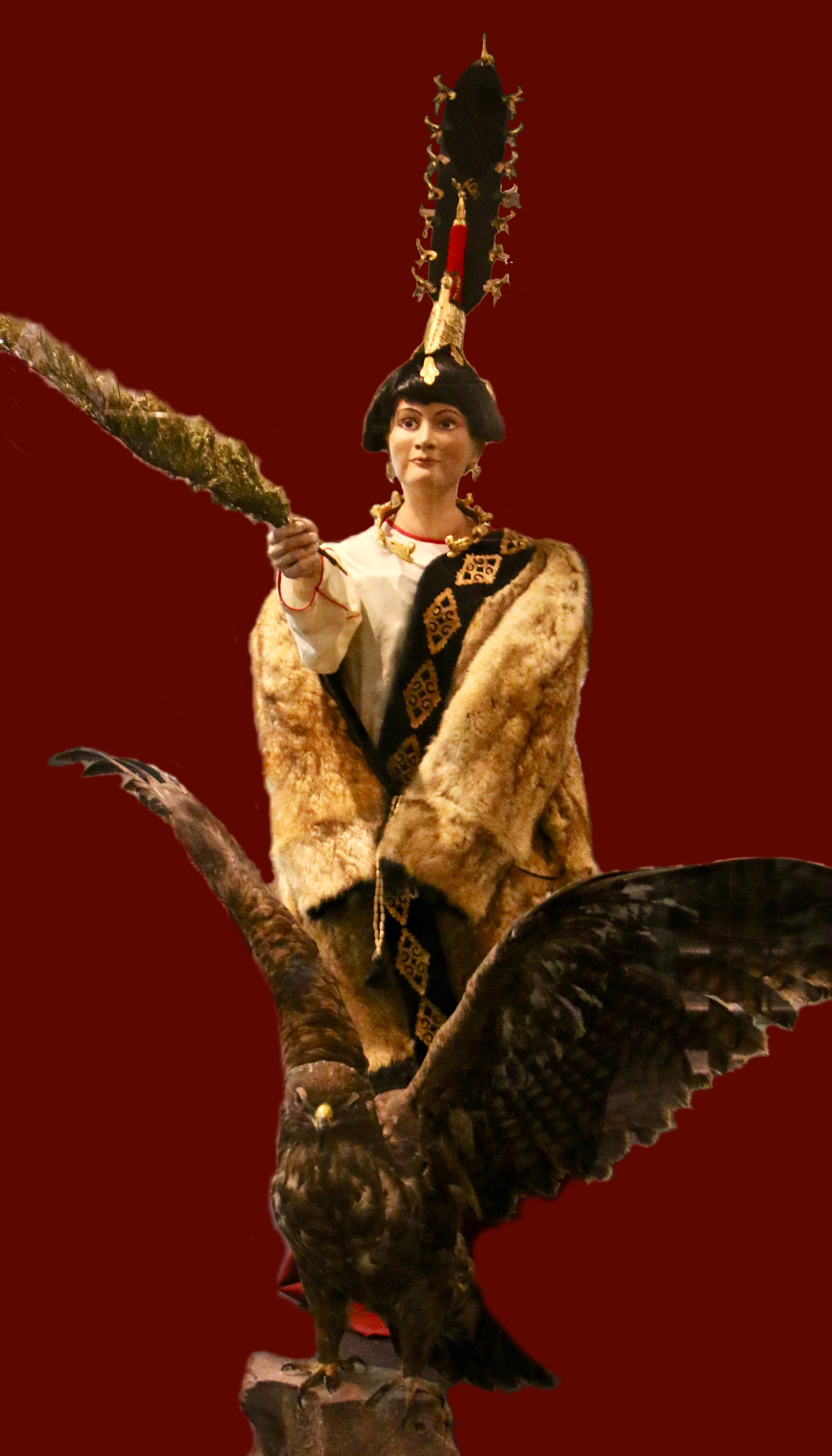
Siberian Ice Maiden (reconstruction, Anokhin Museum).

In September 2012, approximately 19 years after her excavation, the Ice Maiden was returned from Novosibirsk to the Altai Republic and placed in the A. V. Anokhin National Museum of the Altai Republic in Gorno-Altaisk. Her return did not end disagreements over how her remains should be treated. In 2015, Altaian religious leader Akaj Kine brought a court case seeking her removal from the museum and reburial; the museum successfully opposed the claim. Pimenova found that opinions among Altaians were divided. Many museum employees regarded keeping the Ice Maiden in the Altai while preserving her for future study as a compromise between reburial and continued scientific conservation.

From 2012 to 2016, the Ice Maiden's body was concealed from visitors beneath a permanently covered display case. In 2016, more than 20 years after her excavation, the museum began uncovering the body on selected mornings each month. A specially commissioned sarcophagus, made from modern materials to reproduce the form of her ancient burial structure, had been installed in 2015. Scientists recommended that periods of public display last no more than three hours, with the sarcophagus maintained at 16 to 18 °C (61 to 64 °F), under diffuse lighting and with humidity carefully controlled.

The dates on which visitors can see the Ice Maiden are chosen according to traditional Altaian beliefs concerning the phases of the Moon. The museum identifies the third through fifteenth days of the new Moon as favourable for important activities and ceremonies, while the waning Moon, particularly its final days, is considered unfavourable. The museum uses these traditions when preparing its public viewing schedule. Photography using a flash or other additional lighting is prohibited.

== In popular culture ==
- Ledi, a 2018 book-length poem by the Canadian poet Kim Trainor, narrates the controversial excavation of the Ice Maiden.

== See also ==
- Dendrochronology
- Scythians
