= Snegurochka (disambiguation) =

Snegurochka or Snow Maiden, is a character in Russian fairy tales.

Snegurochka may also refer to:

- The Daughter of the Snows a ballet based on a piece about Snegurochka
- Spring Breeze Snegurochka (春風のスネグラチカ, Harukaze no Sunegurachika), manga by Hiroaki Samura
- Snegurochka Planitia, plain around the Renpet Mons volcano on Venus
- Sneguročka, a ballad fairy tale by Svetlana Makarovič

== See also ==
- Snow Maiden (disambiguation)
- The Snow Maiden (disambiguation)
