= Anokhin Museum =

Museum in Altai, Russia

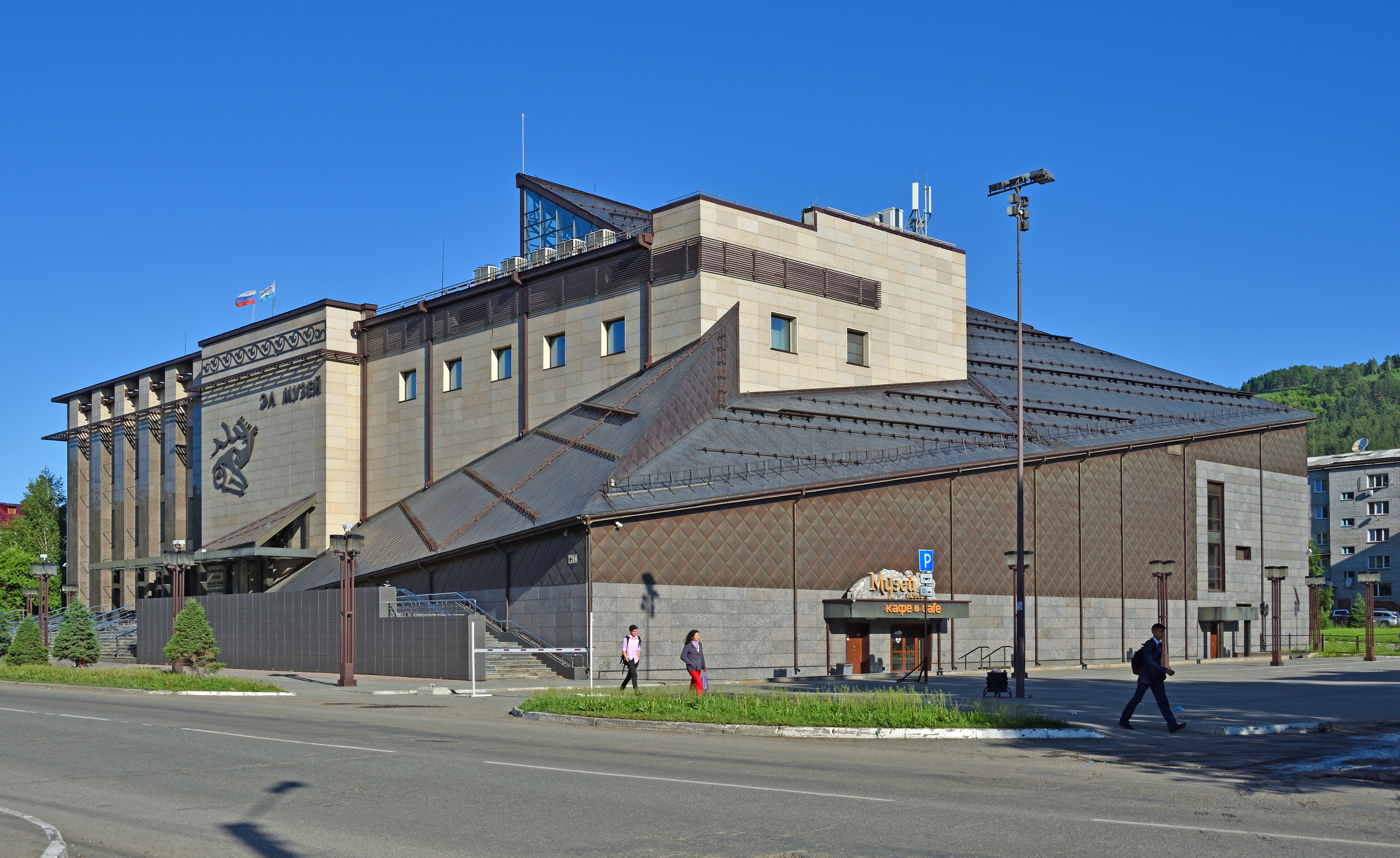
Anokhin Museum

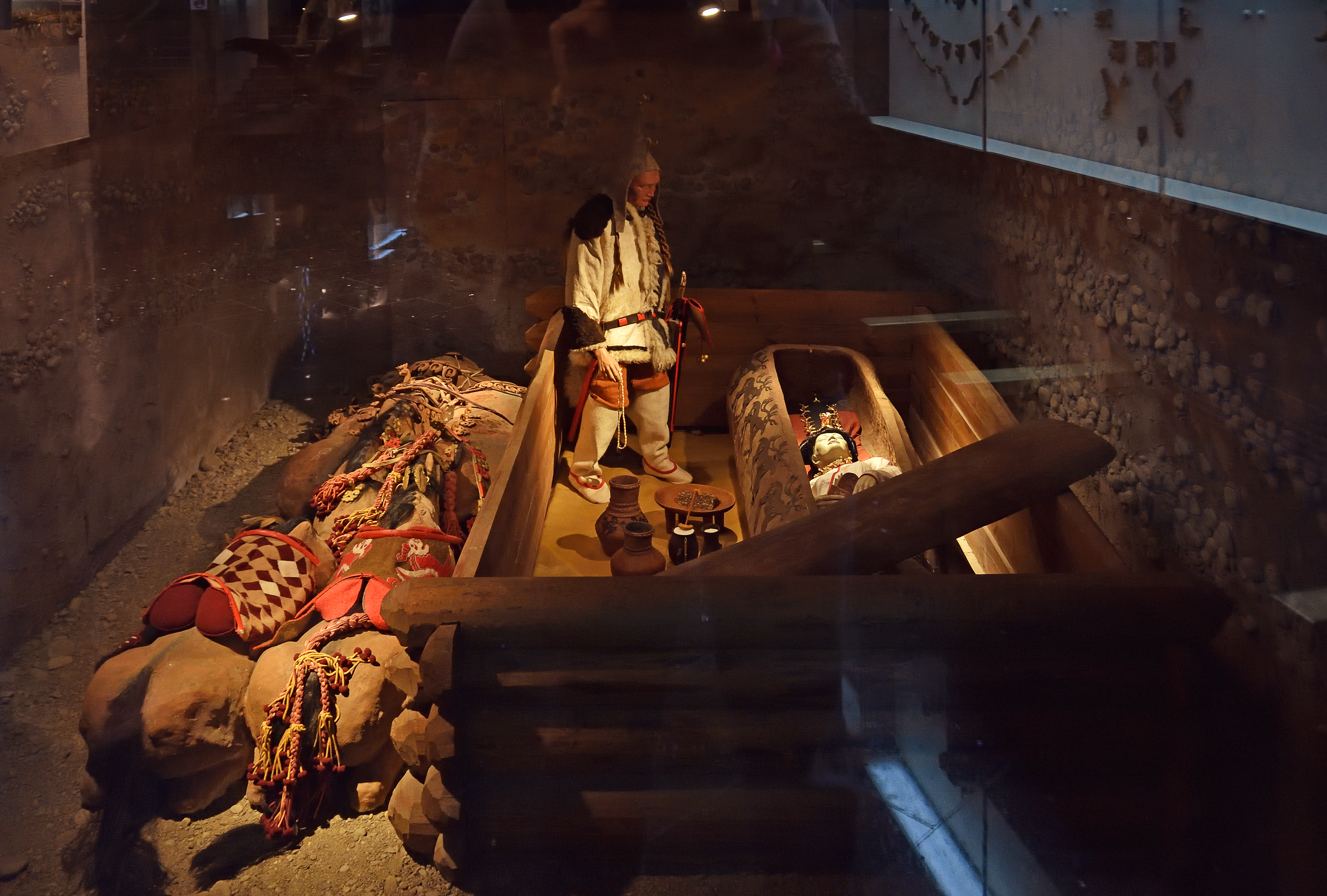
Reconstruction of the tomb of the Siberian Ice Maiden, in the Anokhin Museum.

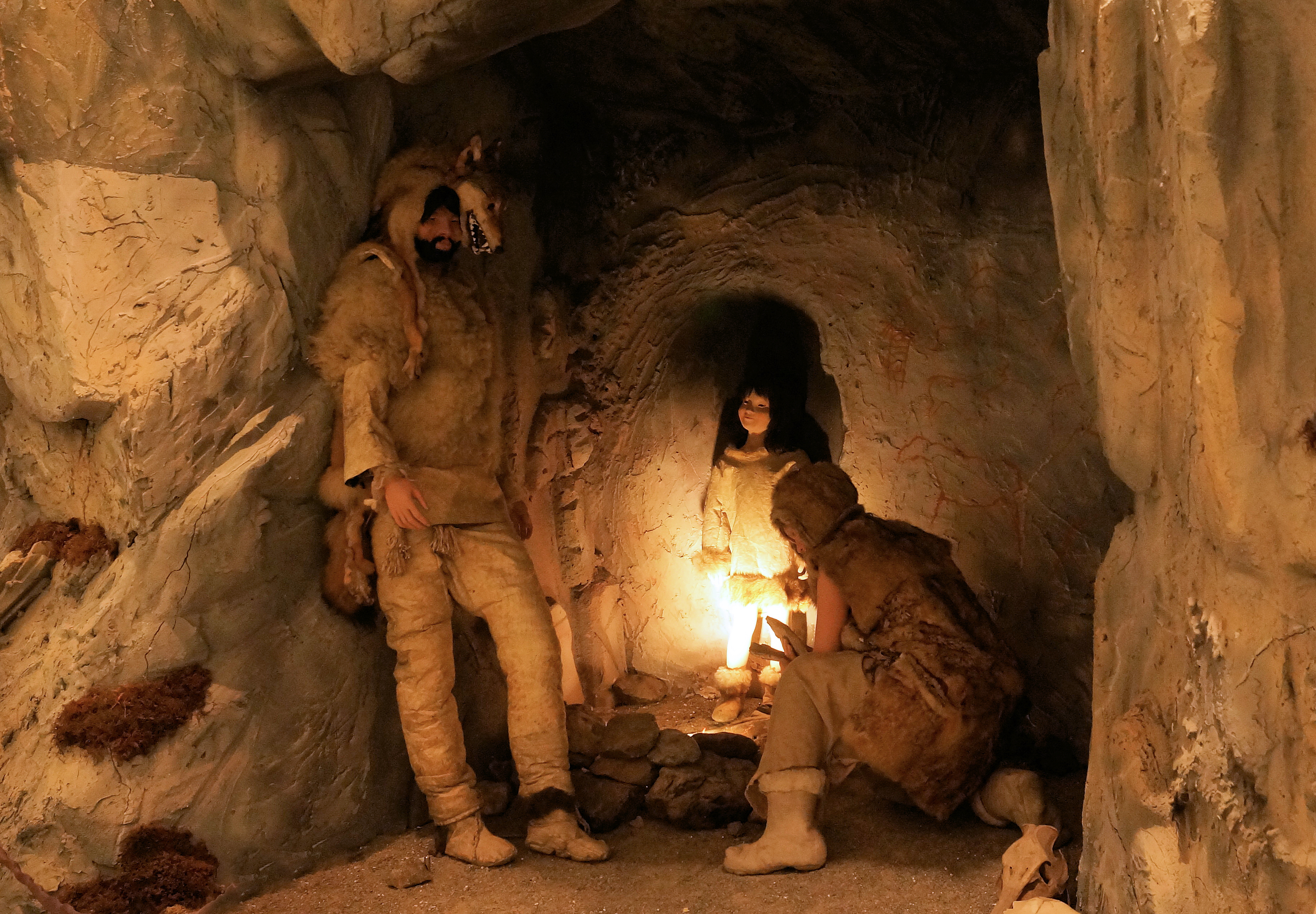
Reconstruction of Altaic cave site, 150.000-10.000 BCE. National Museum of the Altai Republic

The Anokhin Museum (Russian: Национальный музей имени А. В. Анохина; Altay: А. В. Анохинниҥ адыла адалган эл музей, romanized: A. V. Anoxinniñ adıla adalğan el muzey), also National Museum of the Altai Republic, is a national museum located in Gorno-Altaysk, Altai Republic, Russia.

== General information ==
The Anokhin Museum is the national museum of the republic, located in Gorno-Altaysk, the capital city of Altai Republic, in the Chinese and Mongolian borders of the Russian Federation. It was opened in 2012, with the financial help of Gazprom and others, and is named after Andrey Anokhin, a Russian Turkologist and ethnographer.

The museum exhibits the famous "Siberian Ice Maiden" and holds a large archaeological collection. Its address is: Choros-Gurkina ul., d. 46, Gorno-Altaysk 659700, Russia

== Exhibits ==
- Siberian Ice Maiden
- Paintings by Grigory Gurkin

== See also ==
- Andrey Anokhin
