= Mammoth steppe =

Prehistoric biome

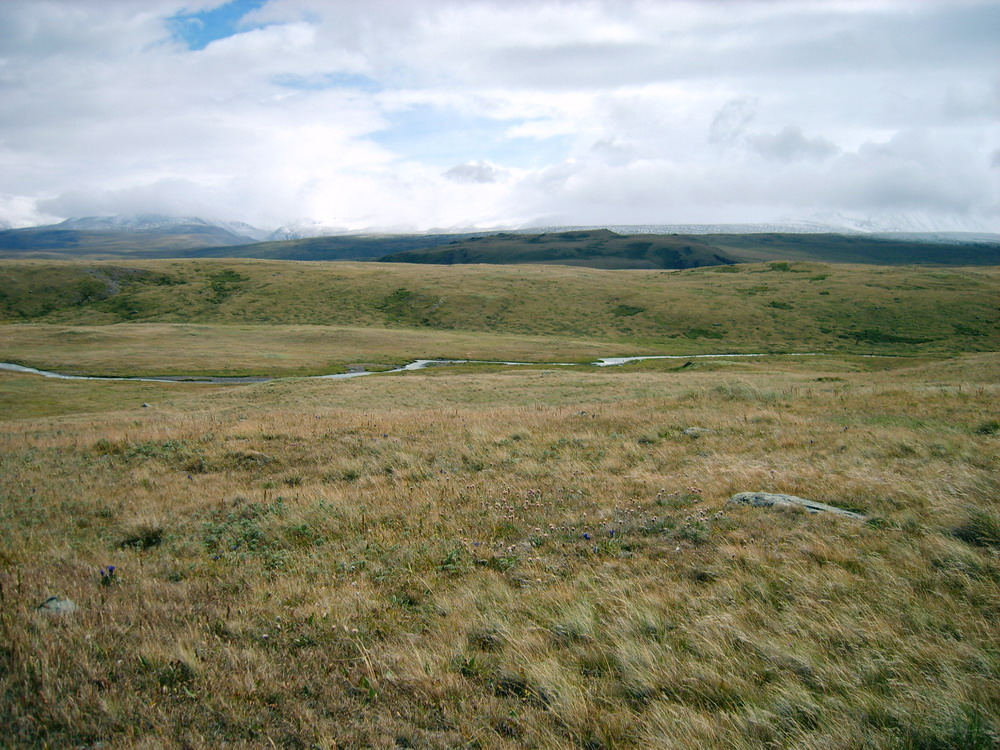
Ukok Plateau, one of the last remnants of the mammoth steppe

The mammoth steppe, also known as steppe-tundra, was once the Earth's most extensive biome. During glacial periods in the later Pleistocene, it stretched east to west from the Iberian Peninsula in the west of Europe, then across Eurasia and through Beringia (the region including the far northeast of Siberia, Alaska and the now submerged land between them) and into the Yukon in northwest Canada; from north to south, the steppe reached from the Arctic southward to southern Europe, Central Asia and northern China. The mammoth steppe was cold and dry, and relatively featureless—though climate, topography, and geography varied considerably throughout. Certain areas of the biome, such as coastal areas, had wetter and milder climates than others. Some areas featured rivers which through erosion naturally created gorges, gulleys, or small glens. The continual glacial recession and advancement over millennia contributed more to the formation of larger valleys and different geographical features. Overall, however, the steppe is known to be flat and expansive grassland. The vegetation was dominated by palatable, high-productivity grasses, herbs and willow shrubs. Although it was primarily a Eurasian and Beringian biome, an analog of the mammoth steppe existed on the southern edge of the Laurentide ice sheet in North America as well, and contained many of the same animals such as woolly mammoths, muskoxen, scimitar cats, and caribou.

The fauna was dominated by species such as reindeer, muskox, saiga antelope, steppe bison, horses, woolly rhinoceros and woolly mammoth. These herbivores, in turn, were followed and preyed upon by various carnivores, such as wolves, brown bears, Panthera spelaea (the cave or steppe-lion), cave hyenas, wolverines, among others, as well as scimitar-toothed cats and giant short-faced bears in east Beringia (with scimitar-toothed cats also having rare records from the mammoth steppe in Eurasia).

This ecosystem covered wide areas of the northern part of the globe, and thrived for approximately 100,000 years without major changes, but then diminished to small regions around 12,000 years ago. Modern humans began to inhabit the biome following their expansion out of Africa, reaching the Siberian Arctic by around 45,000 years ago.

== Naming ==
At the end of the 19th century, Alfred Nehring (1890) and Jan Czerski (Iwan Dementjewitsch Chersky, 1891) proposed that during the last glacial period a major part of northern Europe had been populated by large herbivores and that a steppe climate had prevailed there. In 1982, scientist R. Dale Guthrie coined the term "mammoth steppe" for this paleoregion.

== Origin ==
The steppe-tundra biome first emerged during the glacial period of Marine Isotope Stage 12, around 460,000 years ago during the Middle Pleistocene, uniting animals that inhabited the disparate northern tundra and Central Asian steppe biomes. The size of the steppe-tundra biome would repeatedly expand and contract as a result of subsequent glacial cycles.

The last glacial period, commonly referred to as the 'Ice Age', spanned from 126,000 YBP–11,700 YBP and was the most recent glacial period within the current ice age which occurred during the last years of the Pleistocene epoch. This arctic environment was very cold and dry and probably dusty, resembling mountaintop environments (alpine tundra) and was very different from today's swampy tundra. It reached its peak during the last glacial maximum, when ice sheets commenced advancing from 33,000 YBP and reached their maximum positions 26,500 YBP. Deglaciation commenced in the Northern Hemisphere approximately 19,000 YBP, and in Antarctica approximately 14,500 YBP, which is consistent with evidence that it was the primary source for an abrupt rise in the sea level at that time.

Vegetation types at the time of Last Glacial Maximum

During the peak of the last glacial maximum, a vast mammoth steppe stretched from the Iberian Peninsula across Eurasia and over the Bering land bridge into Alaska and the Yukon where it was stopped by the Wisconsin glaciation. This land bridge existed because more of the planet's water was locked up in ice than now, hence sea levels were lower. When the sea levels began to rise this bridge was inundated around 11,000 YBP.

During glacial periods, there is clear evidence for intense aridity because water was held in glaciers. The mammoth steppe was like a huge 'inner court' that was surrounded on all sides by moisture-blocking features: massive continental glaciers, high mountains, and frozen seas. These kept rainfall low and created more days with clear skies than are seen today, which increased evaporation in the summer leading to aridity, and radiation of warmth from the ground into the night sky in winter leading to cold. This is thought to have been caused by seven factors. These physical barriers to moisture flow created a vast arid basin spanning three continents.

1. The driving force for the core Asian steppe was an enormous and stable high-pressure system north of the Tibetan Plateau.
2. Deflection of the larger portion of the Gulf Stream southward, past southern Spain onto the coast of Africa, reduced temperatures (hence moisture and cloud cover) that the North Atlantic Current brings to western Europe.
3. Growth of the Scandinavian ice sheet created a barrier to North Atlantic moisture.
4. Icing over of the North Atlantic sea surface with reduced flow of moisture from the east.
5. The winter storm track seems to have swept across Eurasia on this axis.
6. Lowered sea levels exposed a large continental shelf to the north and east producing a vast northern plain which increased the size of the continent to the north.
7. North American glaciers shielded interior Alaska and the Yukon Territory from moisture flow.

== Environment (or biota) ==
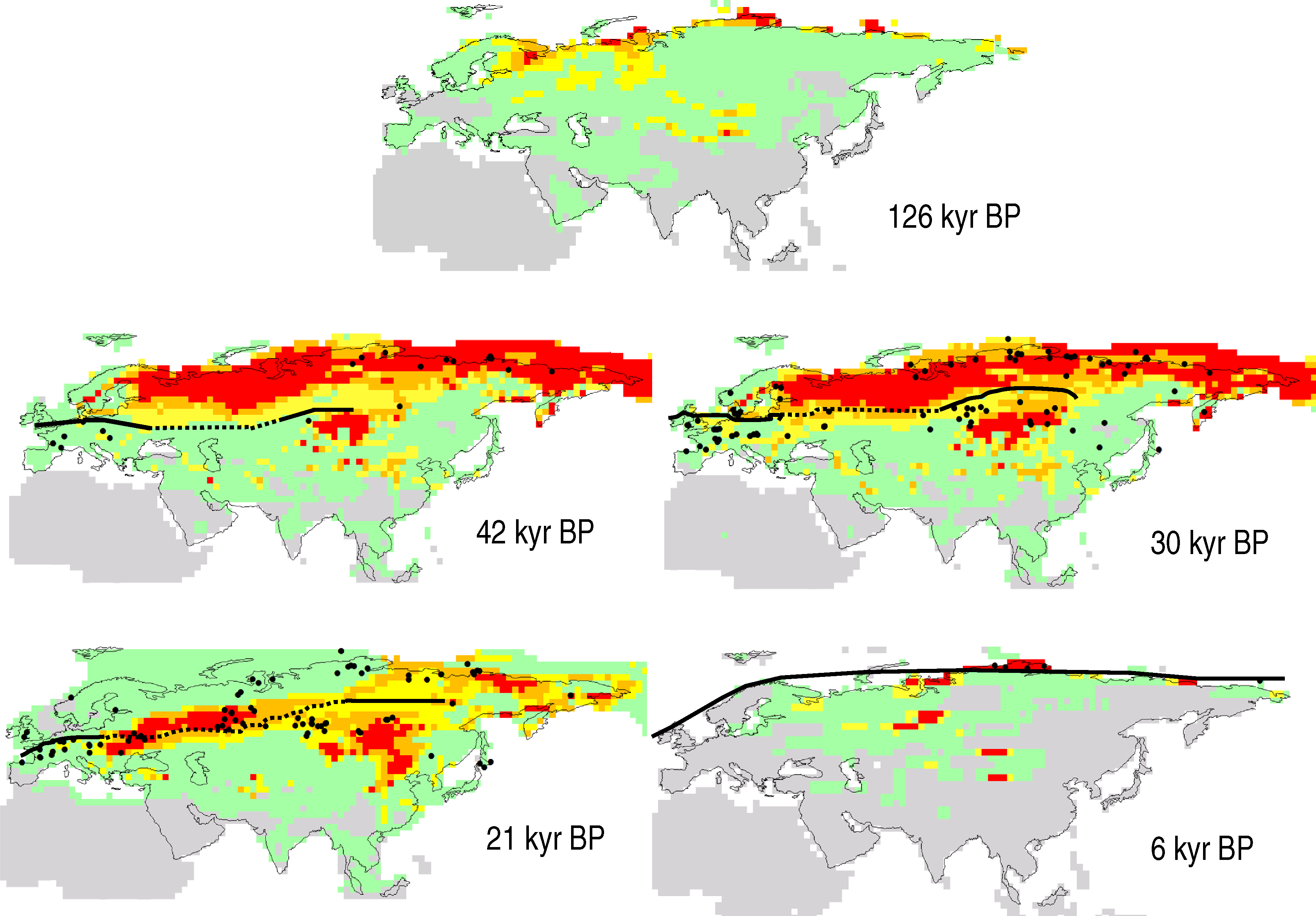
Climatic suitability for the woolly mammoths in the Late Pleistocene and Holocene. Increasing intensities of red represent increasing suitability of the climate and increasing intensities of green represent decreasing suitability. Black points are the records of mammoth presence for each of the periods. Black lines represent the northern limit of contemporary humans and black dotted lines indicate uncertainty in the limit of contemporary humans (D. Nogués-Bravo et al. 2008).

=== Plants ===
The paleo-environment changed across time, a proposal that is supported from mammoth dung samples found in northern Yakutia. During Pleniglacial interstadials, alder, birch, and pine trees survived in northern Siberia, however during the Last Glacial Maximum only a treeless steppe vegetation existed. At the onset of the Late Glacial Interstadial (15,000–11,000 YBP), global warming resulted in shrub and dwarf birch in northeastern Siberia, which was then colonized by open woodland with birch and spruce during the Younger Dryas (12,900–11,700 YBP). By the Holocene (10,000 YBP), patches of closed larch and pine forests developed. Researchers had previously concluded that the mammoth steppe must have been very unproductive because they assumed that its soils had a very low carbon content; however, these soils (yedoma) were preserved in the permafrost of Siberia and Alaska and are the largest reservoirs of organic carbon known. It was a highly productive environment. The vegetation was dominated by palatable high-productivity grasses, herbs and willow shrubs. The herbaceous flora included graminoids such as wild rye, bluegrass, junegrass, fescue, and sedge, and also diverse forbs such as fringed sagebrush, campion, rock-jasmine, cinquefoil, goosefoot, buttercup, and plantain. Herbs were far more widespread than they are today and were the main food source of the large plant eating mammals.

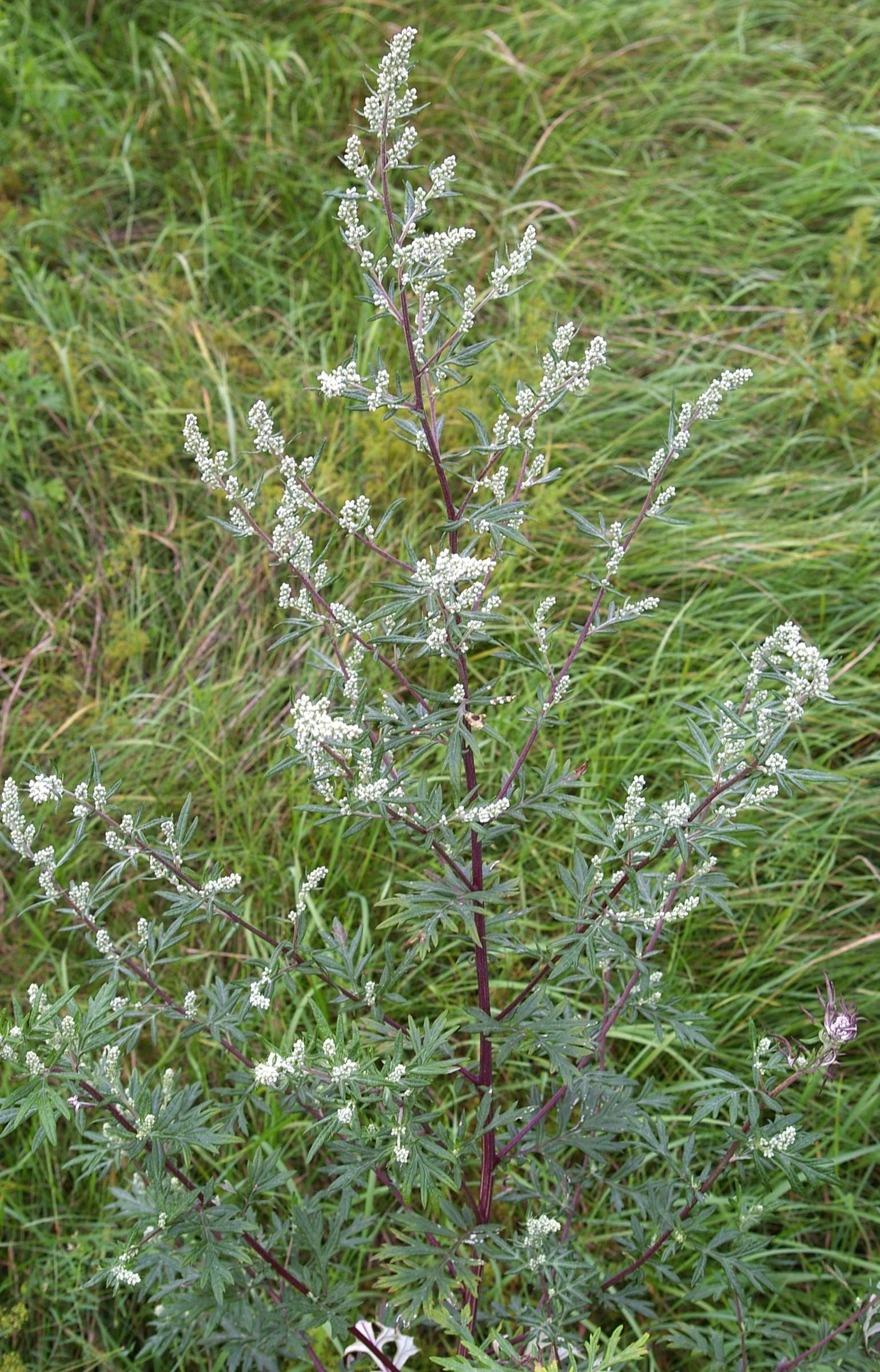
Artemisia, Taymyr lowlands 24,000–10,300 YBP, Yakutia 22,500 YBP, Alaska and the Yukon 15,000-11,500 YBP

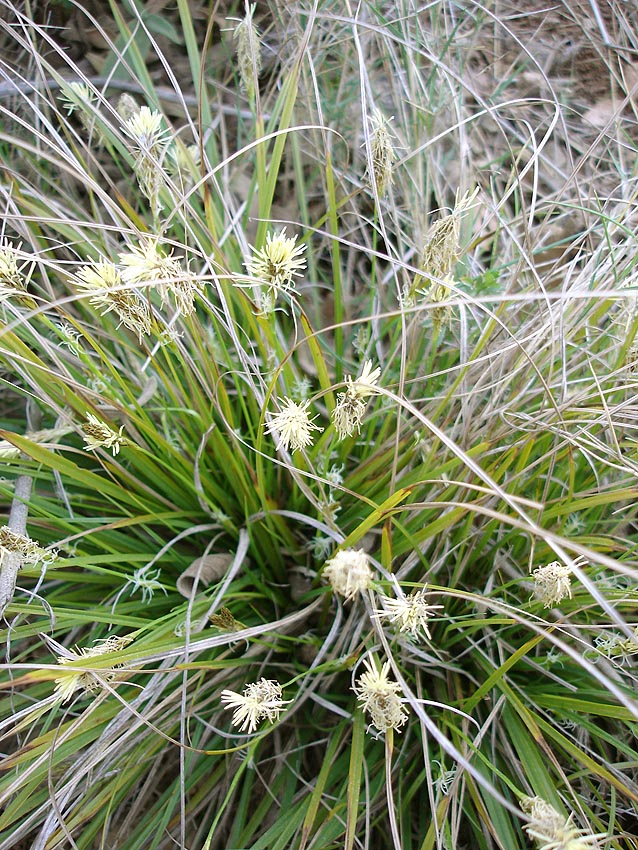
Cyperaceae (sedges), Yakutia 22,500 YBP, Alaska and the Yukon 15,000-11,500 YBP

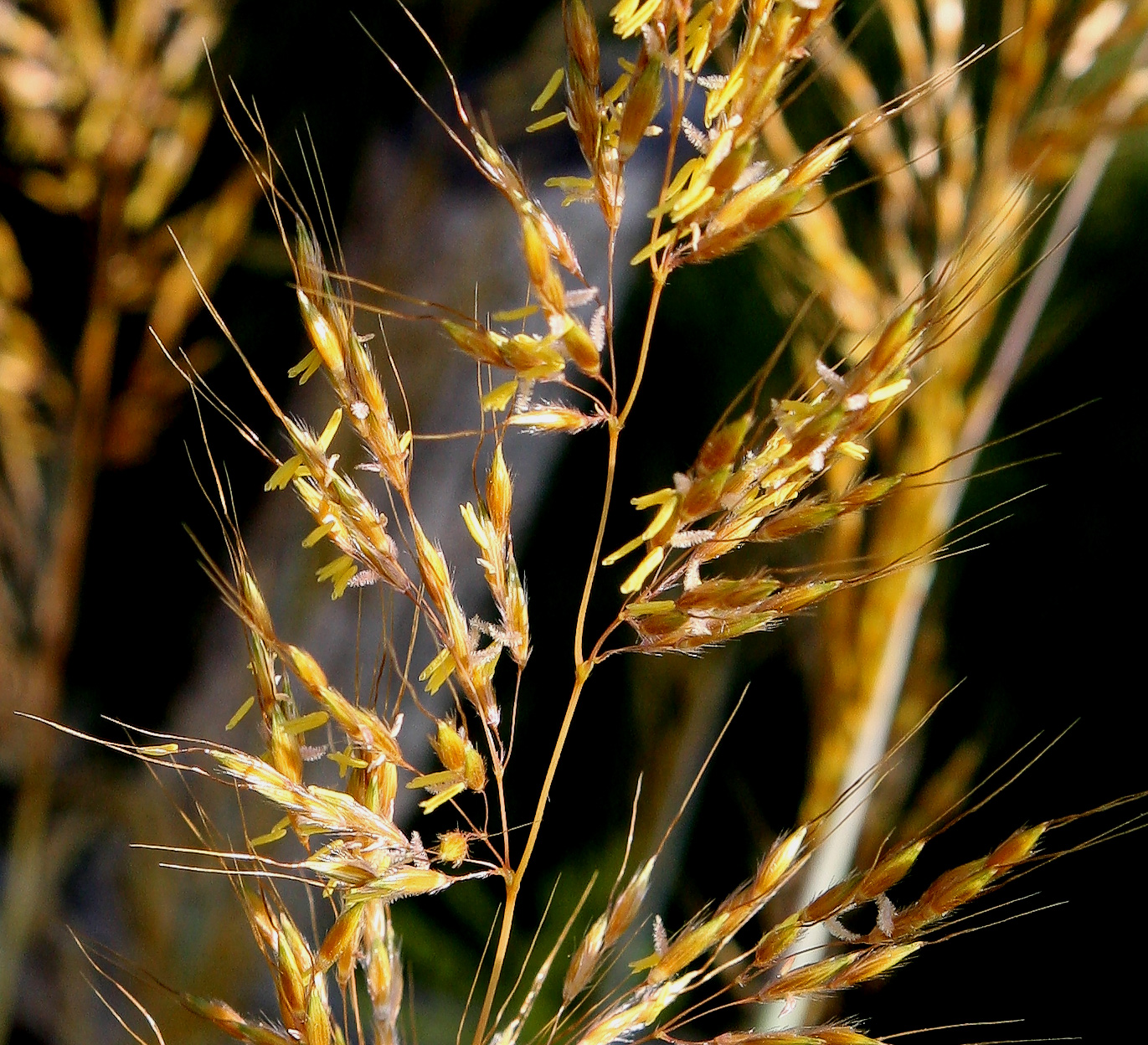
Gramineae (grasses), Taymyr lowlands 24,000–10,300 YBP, Yakutia 22,500 YBP, Alaska and the Yukon 15,000-11,500 YBP

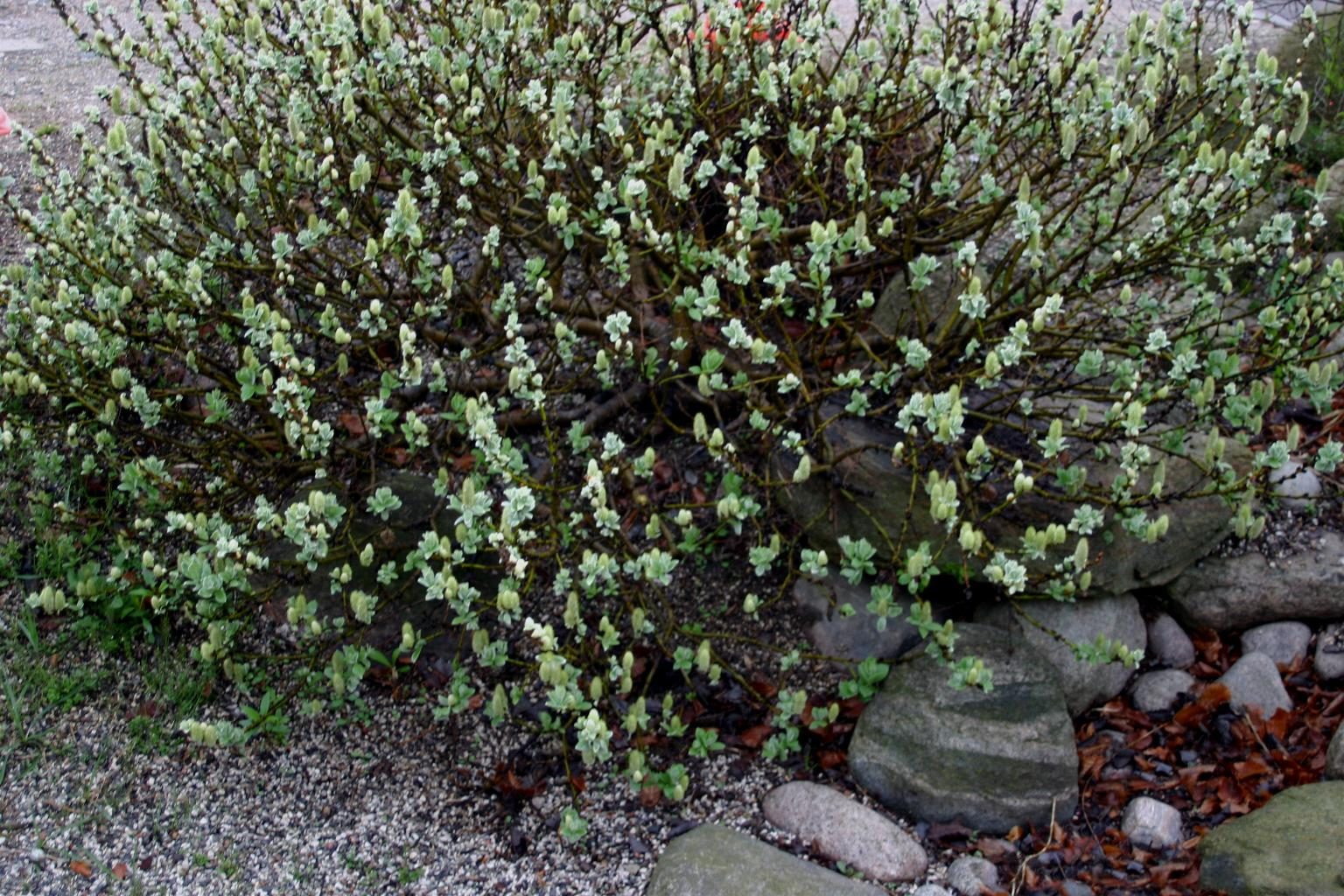
Salix (willow), Taymyr lowlands 24,000–10,300 YBP, Yakutia 22,500 YBP, Alaska and the Yukon 15,000-11,500 YBP

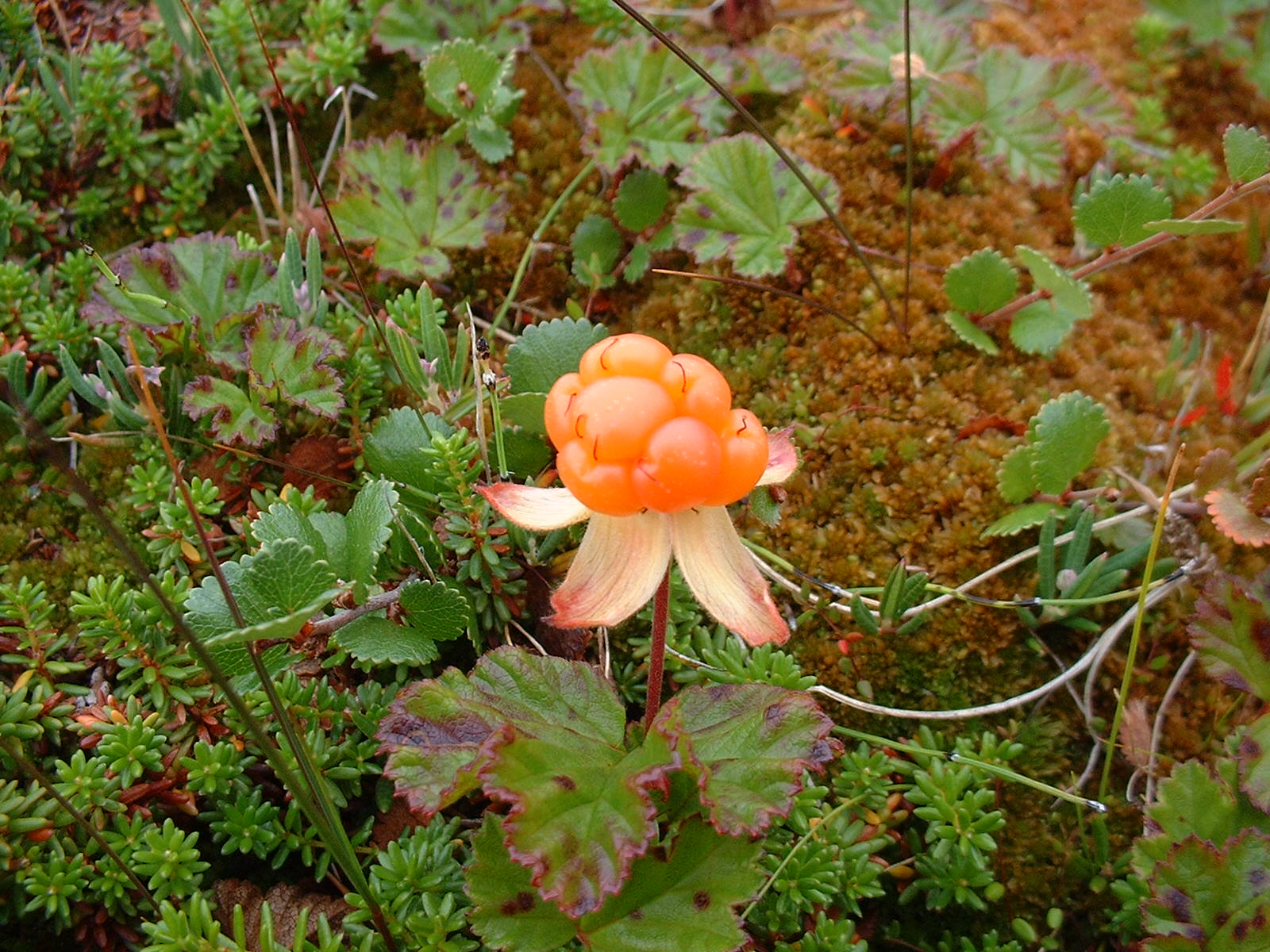
Rubus chamaemorus (cloudberry) Yakutia 22,500 YBP

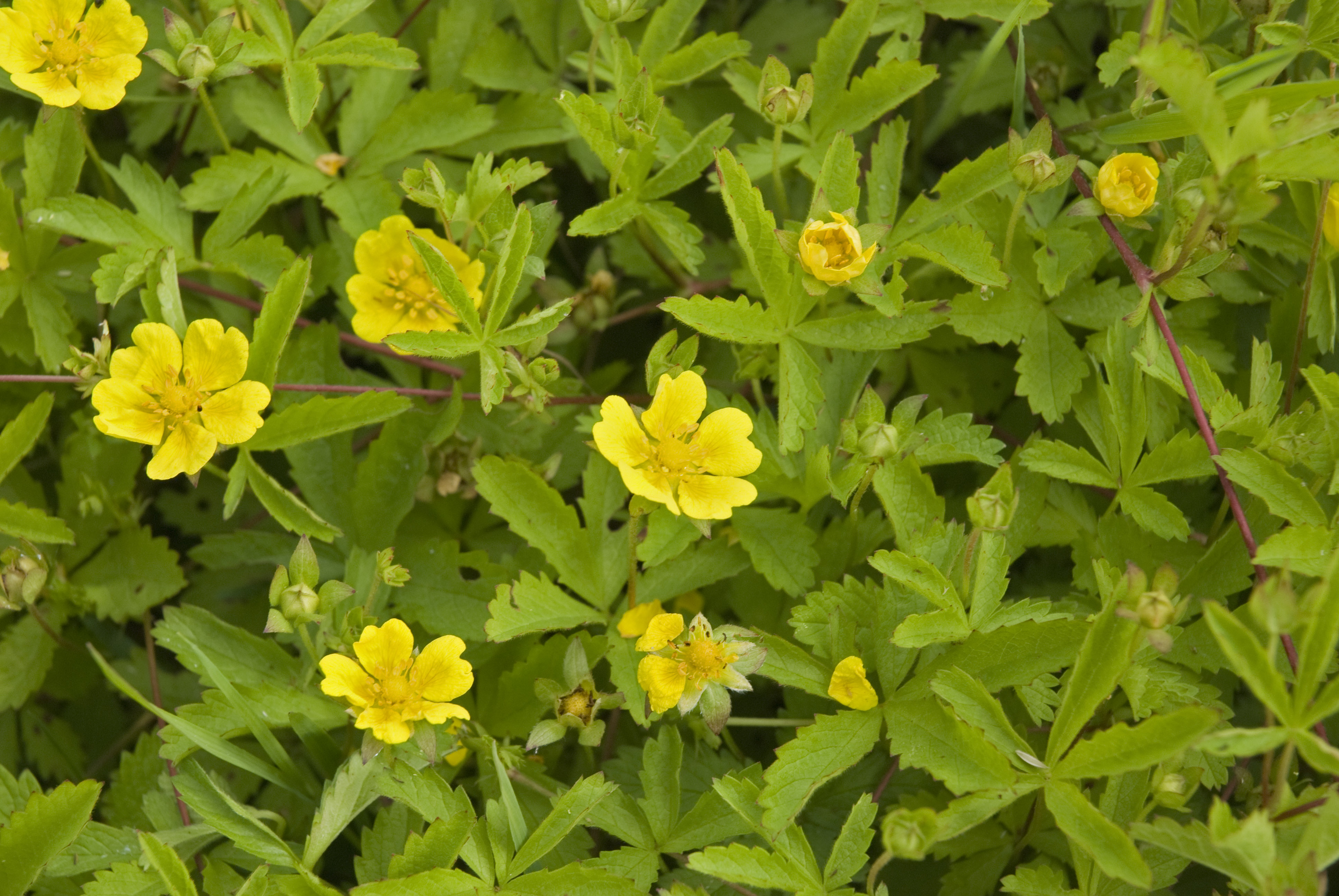
Potentilla (cinquefoil) Yakutia 22,500 YBP

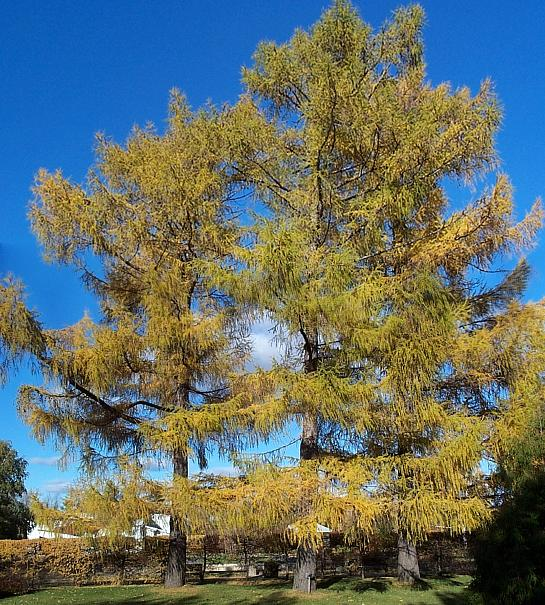
Larch Taymyr lowlands 48,000–25,000 YBP, then later 9,400-2,900 YBP

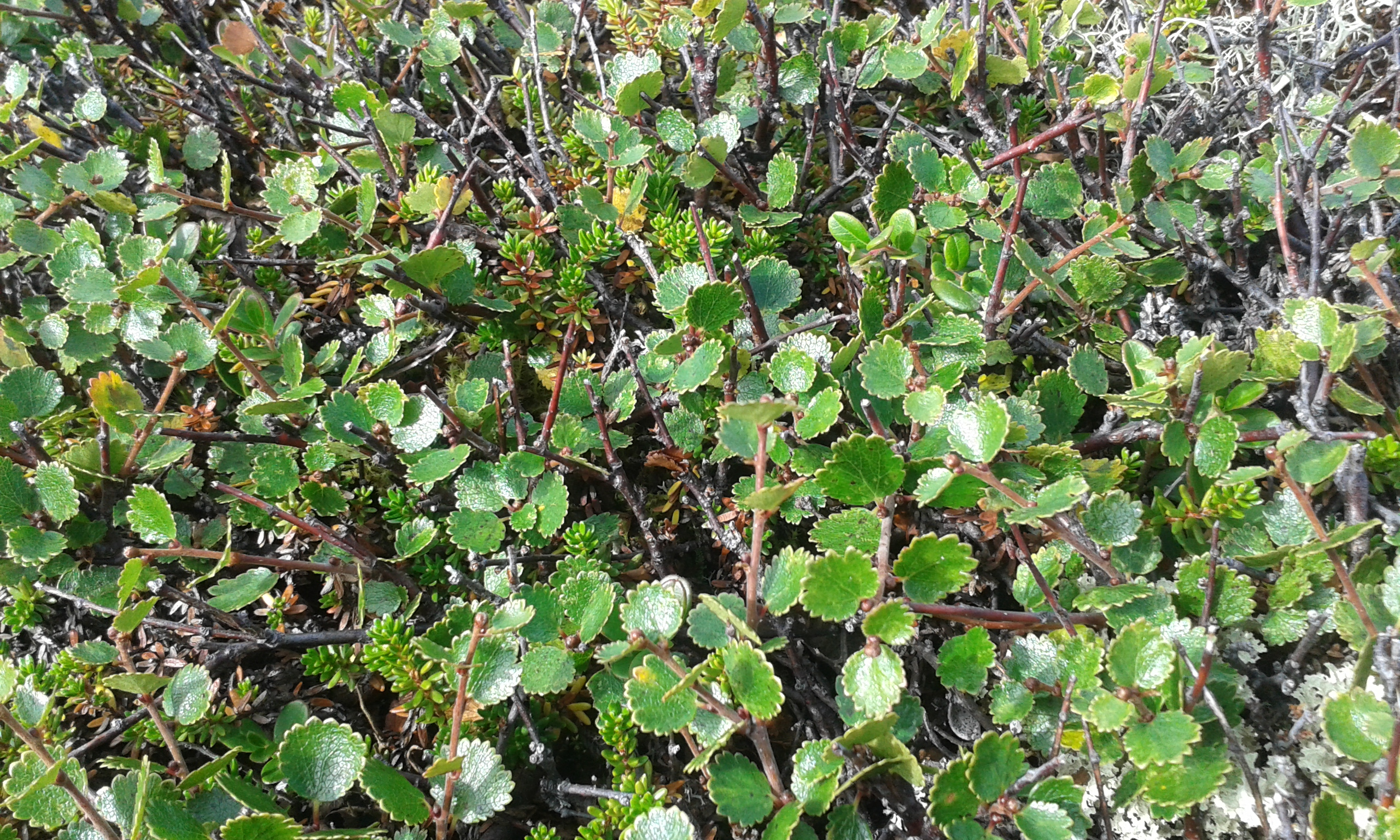
Betula nana (dwarf birch) Taymyr lowlands 48,000–25,000 YBP

=== Animals ===
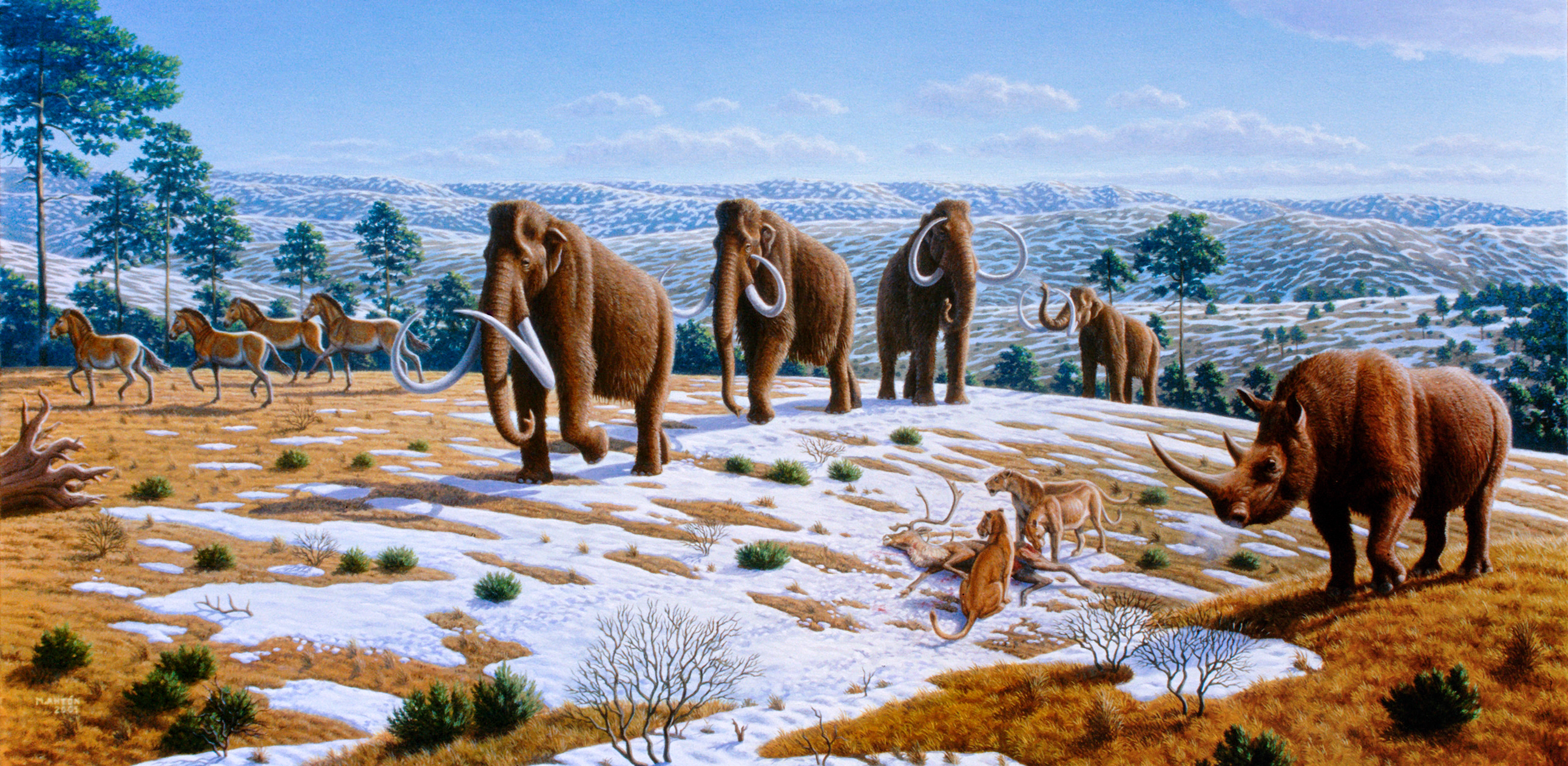
Many giant mammals such as woolly mammoths, woolly rhinoceroses, and cave lions inhabited the mammoth steppe during the Pleistocene.

Varying slightly by geographical location, the mammoth steppe was dominated (in biomass) primarily by giant deer, caribou, steppe bison, horses, woolly mammoth and yak, among other mammals, and was the center for the evolution of the Pleistocene "woolly" fauna. Woolly rhinoceros, moose, saiga antelope and musk ox also lived in different regions of the steppe. In present-day Siberia were the relatives of extant animals like the argali, snow sheep, Siberian roe deer, and the Mongolian gazelle. Not long before the last glacial maximum, an extinct paleospecies of argali (Ovis argaloides) also lived in Europe.

Notable carnivores found across the whole range of the mammoth steppe included the cave lion (Panthera spelaea), wolverine (Gulo gulo), wolf (Canis lupus) and brown bear (Ursus arctos). While the cave hyena was a part of the mammoth steppe fauna in Europe, it did not range into the core high-latitude, northern Eurasian-Siberian reaches of the biome. The short-faced bear (Arctodus simus) was found across the tundra of North America but never crossed over into Asia. Bird remains are rare because of their fragile structure, but there is some evidence for the snowy owl, willow ptarmigan, gyrfalcon, common raven and great bustard. Other bird species included the white-tailed and golden eagles. Vultures, like the griffon and cinereous vulture, are not known but they were likely common scavengers on the mammoth steppe, following the large herds and scavenging on predated or deceased animals. On Wrangel Island, the remains of woolly mammoth, woolly rhinoceros, horse, bison and musk ox have been found. Reindeer (caribou) and smaller animal remains do not preserve well, but reindeer excrement has been found in sediment. Small animals included steppe pika, ground squirrel and alpine marmot. In the most arid regions of the mammoth steppe (that were to the south of Central Siberia and Mongolia), woolly rhinoceroses were common, while woolly mammoths were rare. Reindeer still live in the far north of Mongolia today; their southern boundary passed through Germany and along the steppes of eastern Europe, indicating they once covered much of the mammoth steppe.

Mammoths survived on the Taimyr Peninsula until the Holocene. A small population of mammoths survived on St. Paul Island, Alaska, up until 3750 BC, and the small mammoths of Wrangel Island survived until 1650 BC. Bison in Alaska and the Yukon, and horses and muskox in northern Siberia, have survived the loss of the mammoth steppe. One study has proposed that a change of suitable climate caused a significant drop in the mammoth population size, which made them vulnerable to hunting from expanding human populations. The coincidence of both of these impacts in the Holocene most likely set the place and time for the extinction of the woolly mammoth.

== Decline ==
During the past interglacial warmings, forests of trees and shrubs expanded northward into the mammoth steppe, when northern Siberia, Alaska and the Yukon (Beringia) would have formed a mammoth steppe refugium. When the planet grew colder again, the mammoth steppe expanded. This ecosystem covered wide areas of the northern part of the globe, thrived for approximately 100,000 years without major changes, but then diminished to small regions around 12,000 years ago. There are two theories about the decline of the mammoth steppe: climate change and human predation.

=== Climate change ===
The climatic hypothesis assumes that the vast mammoth ecosystem could have only existed within a certain range of climatic parameters. At the beginning of the Holocene, mossy forests, tundra, lakes and wetlands displaced mammoth steppe. It has been assumed that in contrast to previous interglacials the cold dry climate switched to a warmer wetter climate that in turn caused the disappearance of the grasslands and their dependent megafauna.

The extinct steppe bison survived across the northern region of central eastern Siberia until 8,000 years ago. A study of the frozen mummy of a steppe bison found in northern Yakutia indicated that it was a pasture grazer in a habitat that was becoming dominated by shrub and tundra vegetation. Higher temperature and rainfall led to a decrease in its previous habitat during the early Holocene, and this led to population fragmentation followed by extinction.

The mammoth steppe was covered all winter with snow, which reflected sunlight into the atmosphere and thus delayed the spring warming. With no more mammoths left to push trees down to get at their leaves to eat, the area became covered in tall forest sticking up above the snow all winter and catching the early sunlight and thus causing an early spring warming.

In 2017 a study looked at the environmental conditions across Europe, Siberia and the Americas from 25,000 to 10,000 YBP. The study found that prolonged warming events leading to deglaciation and maximum rainfall occurred just before the transformation of the rangelands that supported megaherbivores into widespread wetlands that supported herbivore-resistant plants. The study proposes that moisture-driven environmental change led to the megafaunal extinctions, and that Africa's trans-equatorial position allowed rangeland to continue to exist between the deserts and the central forests; therefore fewer megafauna species became extinct there.

=== Human predation ===
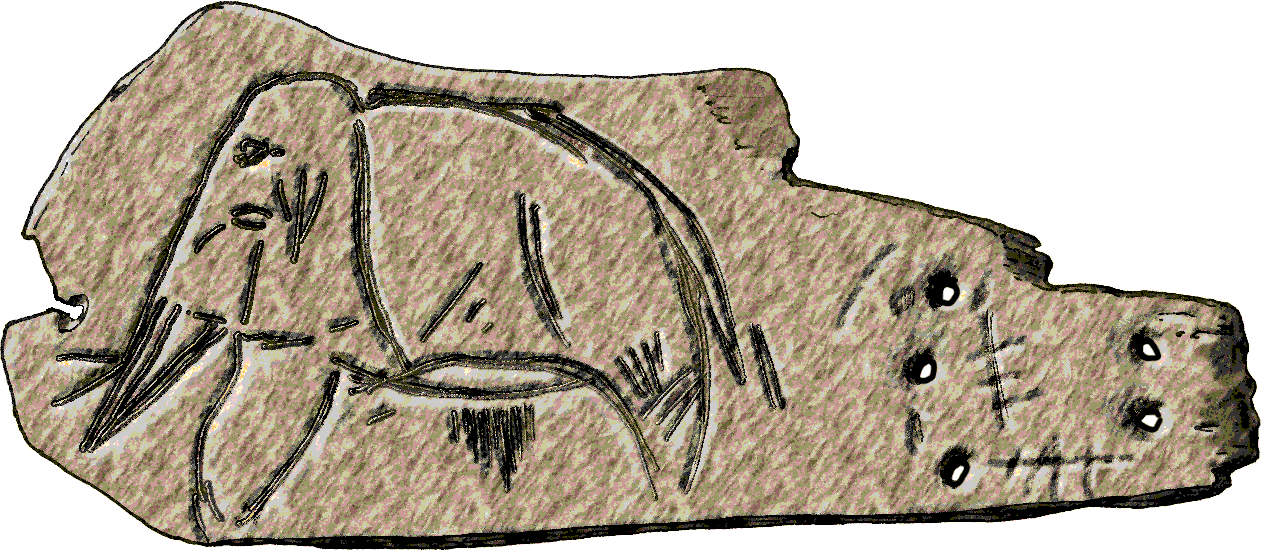
Engraving of a mammoth on a slab of mammoth ivory, from the Upper Paleolithic Mal'ta deposits at Lake Baikal, Siberia. Ancient North Eurasians lived in extreme conditions and survived by hunting mammoths, bison and woolly rhinoceroses.

The ecosystem hypothesis assumes that the vast mammoth ecosystem extended over a range of many regional climates and was not affected by climate fluctuations. Its highly productive grasslands were maintained by animals trampling any mosses and shrubs, and actively transpiring grasses and herbs dominated. At the beginning of the Holocene the rise in precipitation was accompanied by increased temperature, and so its climatic aridity did not change substantially. As a result of human hunting, the decreasing density of the mammoth ecosystem animals was not enough to stop forest from spreading over the grasslands, leading to an increase in forests, shrubs and mosses with further animal reduction due to loss of feed. The mammoth continued to exist on isolated Wrangel Island until a few thousand years ago, and some of the other megafauna from that time still exist today, which indicates that something other than climate change was responsible for megafaunal extinctions.

Remains of mammoth that had been hunted by humans 45,000 YBP have been found at Yenisei Bay in the central Siberian Arctic. Two other sites in the Maksunuokha River valley to the south of the Shirokostan Peninsula, northeast Siberia, dated between 14,900 and 13,600 YBP showed the remains of mammoth hunting and the production of micro-blades similar to those found in northwest North America, suggesting a cultural connection.

== Last remnants ==
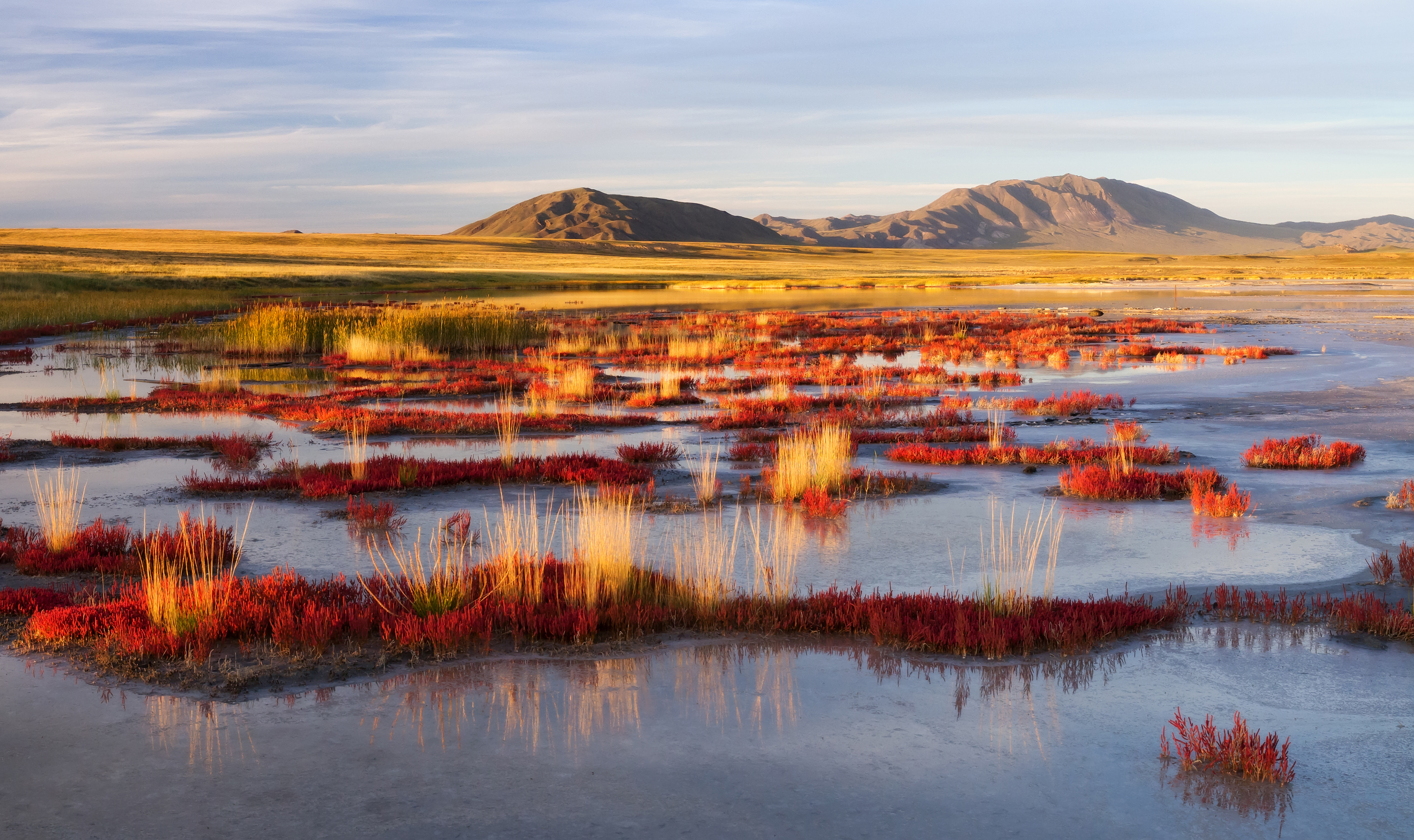
Ubsunur Hollow Biosphere Reserve located on the border of Mongolia and the Republic of Tuva is one of the last remnants of the mammoth steppe

During the Holocene, the arid-adapted species became extinct or were reduced to minor habitats. Cold and dry conditions similar to the last glacial period are found today in the eastern Altai-Sayan mountains of Central Eurasia, with no significant changes occurring between the cold phase of the Pleistocene and the Holocene. Recent paleo-biome reconstruction and pollen analysis suggest that some present-day Altai-Sayan areas could be considered the closest analogue to the mammoth steppe environment. The environment of this region is thought to have been stable for the past 40,000 years.

The eastern part of the Altai-Sayan region forms a refugium. In both the Last Glacial Maximum and modern times, the eastern Altai-Sayan region has supported large herbivore and predator species adapted to the steppe, desert and alpine biomes where these biomes have not been separated by forest belts. None of the surviving Pleistocene mammals live in temperate forest, taiga, or tundra biomes. The areas of Ukok-Sailiugem in the southern Altai Republic and Khar Us Nuur and Uvs Nuur (Ubsunur Hollow) in western Mongolia have supported reindeer and saiga antelope since the glacial period.

== See also ==
- Pleistocene megafauna
- Pleistocene Park – a project to restore a small part of what once was the mammoth steppe.
