= Paspaul =

Paspaul Паспаул
- Village
- Location within Altai Republic Location within Russia
- Coordinates: 51°56′N 86°20′E
- Country: Russia
- Region: Altai Republic
- District: Choysky District
- Time zone: UTC+7:00

Paspaul (Russian: Паспаул; Altay: Паспауул, Paspauul) is a rural locality (a selo) and the administrative centre of Paspaulskoye Rural Settlement of Choysky District, the Altai Republic, Russia. The population was 1243 as of 2016. There are 21 streets.

== Geography ==
Paspaul is located east from Gorno-Altaysk, in the valley of the Malaya Isha River, 19 km southwest of Choya (the district's administrative centre) by road. Sugul is the nearest rural locality.
