= Leonid Potapov (ethnographer) =

Russian ethnographer (1905-2000)

- Леонид Потапов
- Born: Leonid Pavlovich Potapov; 6 July [O.S. 23 June] 1905; Barnaul, Tomsk Governorate, Russian Empire
- Died: 9 October 2000 (aged 95); Komarovo, Russia
- Spouse: Edith Hafferberg
- Awards: Order of the Red Banner of Labour

Leonid Pavlovich Potapov (Russian: Леони́д Па́влович Пота́пов; 6 July 1905 – 9 October 2000) was a Soviet and Russian ethnographer specializing in the study of peoples of southern Siberia.

== Early life and education ==
Leonid Potapov was born in the Altai city of Barnaul. From his early years Potapov showed interest to ethnography of his native land, traveling to study the culture of Altaians with a known Altaist Andrey Anokhin. He visited Alatai in 1925 to gather ethnographic material on behalf of the Russian Geographical Society. He graduated from the geographical department of the Leningrad State University with a major in ethnography in 1928. Here he had studied with Lev Sternberg, Vladimir Bogoraz, Dmitry Zelenin, and Sergei Rudenko. Alexander Samoylovich, and Sergey Malov tutored him in Türkic languages.

== Career ==
Following his graduation Potapov was appointed a head of scientific department in an Uzbek research institute, leading ethnographic expeditions to various areas of Uzbekistan.

Doctor of Historical sciences, professor, "Tuvan ASSR Honored Worker of Science", an outstanding researcher of history and culture of Altaians, Shors, Khakas, Tuvans and other peoples of southern Siberia. He continued to collect material, publishing his first major text Essays on Shoria history in 1931 and continued with his post graduate work at the Academy of Sciences of the Soviet Union. He accepted Marxism–Leninism and its application to ethnography. After completing his postgraduate study, Potapov headed the Siberia and ethnography department of the State Ethnographical Museum of the USSR peoples in the Kunstkamera and conducted research work at the Academy of Sciences of the Soviet Union's History of Material Culture Institute.

In 1939, Potapov gained a PhD in Historical Sciences, presenting the monograph Relicts of primitive-communal system of Altai peoples. By that time Potapov had published about 30 works, including a number of monographs. At the beginning of the World War II Potapov worked on the evacuation of museum valuables, moving with the museum collection to Novosibirsk in 1942. In 1946 he published Altaians and was appointed professor. he then headed the Khakass ethnographic expedition, spending the next 11 years with various expeditions to Altai, Shoria, Khakassia and Tuva. He broadened his research materials on shamanism incorporating non-soviet sources. Potapov focussed on pre-Islam beliefs of peoples of Central Asia, ethnogenesis, ethnographic materials, archival, written and archeological sources.

In 1948 Potapov published "Essays on history of Altaians" (Novosibirsk, 1948), which was awarded with Stalin Prize. He contributed to Essays on the USSR history, History of the USSR, the five-volume History of Siberia and published Brief Esasay on culture and a life of Altaians (Gorno-Altaisk, 1948), Brief Essays on history and ethnography of Khakases (17th–19th centuries) (Abakan, 1952), Origin and formation of Khakass nation (Abakan, 1957), Ethnic Composition and Origin of Altaians (Leningrad, 1969), Essays on native life of Tuvinians (Moscow, 1969).

From 1957 to 1966 the Tuva Archeological Ethnographical Expedition worked on studies of ethnogenesis and history of Tuvinians. working with A.D. Grach, S.I. Weinstein and V.P. Diakonova, he edited the three-volume Works of Tuva complex archeological ethnographical expedition. Participants wrote a collective monograph "History of Tuva" (Vol. 1). In 1956 Potapov wrote chapters on 'Altaians', 'Khakases', 'Tuvinians' and 'Shors' for the Peoples of Siberia in Nations of the world series, published also in English by the University of Chicago. Potapov participated in the 23rd and 25th congresses of Orientalists, and in the 6th and 7th congresses of anthropologists and ethnographers (Paris, 1960).

Potapov created a scientific school studying the peoples of Siberia, especially the Altai-Sayan region, and prepared 48 PhD in sciences. A special scientific contribution was his work Altai shamanism (1991) with a rich collection of material brought from uncountable field research materials. Potapov joined the names of Nicholas Poppe (1970), Vera Tsintsius (1972), Andrei Kononov (1976), Nikolai Baskakov (1980), Aleksandr Shcherbak (1992) who were awarded "PIAK Gold medal" for Altaic studies.

== Bibliography ==
The extensive bibliographical listing does not attempt to list all of Potapov's works, but only to give a representative sample of the breadth and depth of Potapov's contributions to Türkology and associated sciences.

- "Die Herstellung der Šamanentrommel bei den Šor" // Mitteilungen des Seminars für Orientalische Sprachen zu Berlin Jg. XXXVII. Abt. I Ostasiatische Studien (further - MSOS), Berlin, 1934, pp. 53–73. (co-authorship with K. Menges).
- "Materialien zur Volkskunde der Türkvölker des Altaj" // MSOS. Jg. XXXVII. Abt. I Ostasiatische Studien, Berlin, 1934 (co-authorship with K. Menges) (Rets. Malov S.E" // BV, 1937, Issue.10 (1936.) pp. 165–168.)
- Volkskundliche Texte Šor Kizi // MSOS, Jg. XXXVII, Abt. I Ostasiatische Studien - S. 73-105 (co-authorship with K. Menges).
- "Essays on Shoria history", Moscow - Leningrad, 1936. (full text)
- "Traces de conception totemiques chez les Altaïens dans L. Moryensten: L'exposition d'aptiranien" // Revue Arts Asiatiques. 1936. Vol.10. P.199-210.
- Uigur Khanate // History of the USSR, Vol.1, Part 4., 1939 (co-author S.V.Kiselyov)
- "Ainu - inhabitants of Southern Sakhalin and Kuriles" // SE, 1946, No 2, pp. 216–218.
- "Religious and magic functions of shaman tambourines" // Briefs of Ethnography Institute Academy of Sciences of the Soviet Union. Moscow, 1946. Issue 1, pp. 41 – 45.
- "A ceremony of revival of shaman tambourine among Türkic-speaking tribes of Altai" // Works of Ethnography Institute Academy of Sciences of the Soviet Union. Vol. 1. Moscow - Leningrad, 1947, ( full text)
- "Ethnic structure of Sagais" // SE, 1947, No 3, pp. 103–127.
- From trip to Sagais// Briefs of Ethnography Institute Academy of Sciences of the Soviet Union, 1948, Issue 4, ( full text)
- Essays on history of Altaians, Novosibirsk: OGIZ, 1948, (Stalin/State premium of the USSR)
- "Tamburine of Teleut shaman and her figures" // Coll. MAHE, Leningrad, 1949, ( full text)
- "Heroic epos of Altaians" // SE, 1949, No 1
- Clothing of Altaians // Coll. MAHE. Moscow - Leningrad, Publishing house Academy of Sciences of the Soviet Union, 1951 - Issue 13, pp. 5–59. ( full text)
- Brief Essays on history and ethnography of Khakases (XVIII-XIX centuries), Abakan, 1952, 217 pp.
- "Essay on an ethnogenesis of southern Altaians" // SE, 1952, No 3 pp. (Also In Chinese and English)
- Essays on history of Altaians. Moscow - Leningrad, Publishing house Academy of Sciences of the Soviet Union, 1953
- Origin and ethnic structure of Koibals // SE, 1953, No 3
- Application of historico-ethnographical method in study of Ancient Türkic culture monuments. Reports of the Soviet delegation on 5th International congress of anthropologists and ethnographers. Moscow, 1956, 28 pp.
- An origin and ethnic structure Koibals // SE, 1956, No 3
- Origin and formation of Khakass nation, Abakan, 1957
- Samanismus u narodu Sayansko-Altajske vysociny jako historicky pramen // Ceskoslovenska etnografia, 1957. Sv.5, No 2, S.134-145.
- Z dejin kocovnictvive Stredni Asii // Ceskoslovenska etnografia, 1957. Sv.5, No 2, S.260-280.
- Zum Problem der Herkunft und Ethnogenese der Koibalen und Motoren // Journal de la Societe Finno-Ugrien. Helsinki, 1957. Vol.59, P.104.
- "Wolf in ancient national beliefs and omens of Uzbeks" // Briefs of Ethnography Institute Academy of Sciences of the Soviet Union, Issue 30, Moscow, 1958,
- Nova komplexni expedice Institut Ethnografie Akad. Ved SSSR // Ceskoslovenska etnografia, 1958. Sv, 6, N 3
- Samanske bubny Altaiskych narodnosti // Ceskoslovensko etnografia, 1959. Sv.7, No 4
- "Gocebelerin ibtidai cemaat hagatlarinianlatan cok eskibiradet" // Jarich Dergisi. Istanbul, 1960
- "Die Schamanentrommel bei den Altaischen Völkerschaften" // Glabenswelt und Folklore der sibirischen Völker, Budapest, 1963, S. 223-256.
- Türkic peoples of Southern Siberia in the 6th-8th centuries // History of Siberia. Moscow, 1964, Vol.1
- "Tuva in Türkic Kaganate" // History of Tuva, Vol. 1. Moscow, 1964
- Peoples of Southern Siberia in the 6th-8th centuries // History of Siberia, Vol.1, Novosibirsk, 1965.
- Ethnonym "Tele" and Altaians // Türkological collection, Moscow: Science, 1966, ( full text)
- Ethnic history of Kumandins // History, archeology and ethnography of Central Asia. Moscow, 1968 ( full text)
- "Shamans' Drums of Altaic Ethnic Groups" // Popular Beliefs and Folklore Tradition in Siberia, Budapest, 1968, pp. 205–234.
- Türkic peoples of Southern Siberia // History of Siberia from most ancient times, Leningrad, 1968, Vol 1
- Yenisei Kirgiz // History of Siberia from most ancient times, Leningrad, 1968, Vol 1
- Ethnic structure and origin of Altaians. Historico-ethnographical sketch, Leningrad,: Science, 1969 ( full text In Russian)
- Semantics of names of shaman tambourines among Altai nations // Soviet Turkology, Baku, 1970, No 3
- Tubalars of Mountain Altai // Ethnic history of peoples of Asia. Moscow, 1972 ( full text)
- Tülbers of the Yenisei runic inscriptions // Türkological collection. 1971. Moscow, Science, 1972 ( full text)
- "Aspects of Siberian shamanism study', Chicago, 1973
- A note to origin of Chelkans-Lebedins // Bronze and Iron Age of Siberia, Ancient Siberia, Issue 4, Novosibirsk, "Science",1974 ( full text)
- Altai-Sayan ethnographic parallels to Ancient Türkic sacrificial ceremony of domesticated animals and their historical meaning // Scientific Notes of Mountain Altai Institute, Gorno-Altaisk, 1974, Issue 11
- Über den Pferdkult beiden turksprachigen Volkern des Altai-Sayan Gebirges // Abchandlungen und Berichte des Staatlichen Museum fur Volkerkunde Dresden. Berlin, 1975. Bd 34.
- Historical connections of Altai-Sayan peoples with Sakha (Yakuts) // All-Union Türkological conference, Alma-Ata, 1976 ( full text)
- Signification rituelle du pelage des chevaux chez les populations Altai-Sayannen // L'ethnografie (Paris.), 1977, No 2
- "Problem of Altai shamanism's ancient Türkic origin and dating" // Ethnography of peoples of Altai and Western Siberia, Novosibirsk, 1978, pp. 3–36
- Mythology of Türkic-speaking peoples // Myths of nations of the world. Moscow, 1982, Vol. 2
