= Andrey Anokhin =

Russian ethnographer/music scientist/composer

Andrey Viktorovich Anokhin (Russian: Андре́й Ви́кторович Ано́хин; 28 October 1869 – 31 August 1931) was an ethnographer, music scientist and composer from the Russian Empire and later the Soviet Union.

Andrey Anokhin was born in a village Right Lamki in Tambov Governorate's Arjan district. In the beginning of 1870 his family moved to Biysk. Anokhin graduated Biysk missionary school, continued his training in the Moscow Synodal School, and later took courses in the Saint Petersburg imperial court singing chapel. From 1900 Anokhin taught and composed in Tomsk; he joined the Tomsk branch of the Russian Musical Society and the Tomsk Society for Siberian studies led by Grigory Potanin. From 1906 to 1931 Anokhin made numerous ethnographic and folklore expeditions across Southern Siberia, Mongolia, and Eastern Kazakhstan. Anokhin worked with the Museum of Anthropology and Ethnography (Kunstkamera), which stores the materials of Anokhin's expeditions.

Andrey Anokhin studied a musical culture of Altaians, recorded and processed more than 500 Altai songs, and about 300 songs of Teleuts, Khakases, and Tuvinians. He produced descriptions of national musical instruments, distinct musical harmonics, tonality and rhythm of the national songs and musical compositions. Anokhin wrote a number of research reports, and published works "Bogatyr (Mighty hero) epos", "Buddhist temple music", "Materials about Altaians' shamanism" [Texts/Anokhin-Shamanstvo.pdf] (Leningrad, 1924), "Burhanizm in Western Altai" (collection "Siberian lights", 1927).

From 1918 Anokhin worked in Chemal school in Altai, from 1921 he lived in Barnaul, teaching music and singing. He became an initiator of a concert series that included his compositions, a suite "Khan-Altai", poem "Khan-Erlik", an oratorio "Talai-khan". He authored musical compositions on Altai themes "Sary-khan", "Kanza-biy", "Tabyskak", some of his songs developed into folk songs.

In 1923 for his research about the beliefs of southern Altaians, Anokhin was elected a Corresponding Member of the USSR Academy of Sciences. From 1926 he lived in Gorno-Altaysk; one of his students was a future prominent Turkologist professor Leonid Potapov.

== Bibliography ==
- "Altaian legends about their bogatyr kings" // Tomsk eparchial news, 1912. No 14, 15, in Russian
- "Shamanism of Teleuts" // Siberian life, 1916, No 253, in Russian
- "Materials on Altaians' shamanism" // Coll. MAHE. - Leningrad, 1924. - Vol. 4, Issue 2 (republished in Altaisk, Ak-Chechek, 1994), in Russian
- "Burhanism in the Western Altai" // Siberian lights, 1927. No 5, in Russian
- "Soul and its properties in the beliefs of Teleuts" // Coll. MAHE, Leningrad, 1929, Vol. 8, in Russian
- "Kuznetsk alians of Tomsk province" // Shor collection. - Issue 1, Kemerovo, Kuzbassvuzizdat, 1994, (republished, in Russian colonial lingo the native peoples were "aliens"), in Russian
- "Mystery Ejik-Tengerezi (translation from Teleut)" // (republished), Moscow, 1997, in Russian
- "Tamburine of Bachat Teleuts of Kuznetsk district Tomsk province" // (republished), EO, 1997, No 4, in Russian
- "Talai-khan" // (republished), Teleut folklore, Moscow, Science, 2004, in Russian
- "From A.V. Anokhin fund (MAHE, folio11, list 1, file 94, Burhanism - Ak-Jang: documents and Materials)" // Gorno-Altaisk, Yuch-Sümer - Belukha, 2004, in Russian
