= The Snow Maiden (disambiguation) =

The Snow Maiden: A Spring Fairy Tale is an opera in four acts with a prologue by Nikolai Rimsky-Korsakov, composed during 1880–1881.

The Snow Maiden may also refer to:

- The Snow Maiden (play), an 1873 play by Aleksander Ostrovsky, which inspired the opera
- The Snow Maiden (1952 film), an animated film based on the opera
- The Snow Maiden (1968 film), a 1968 live-action film based on the play, directed by Pavel Kadochnikov

== See also ==
- Snow Maiden (disambiguation)
- Snegurochka (disambiguation)
