= Ukok Plateau =

Plateau in Altai Republic, Russia

- Укок / hohegh
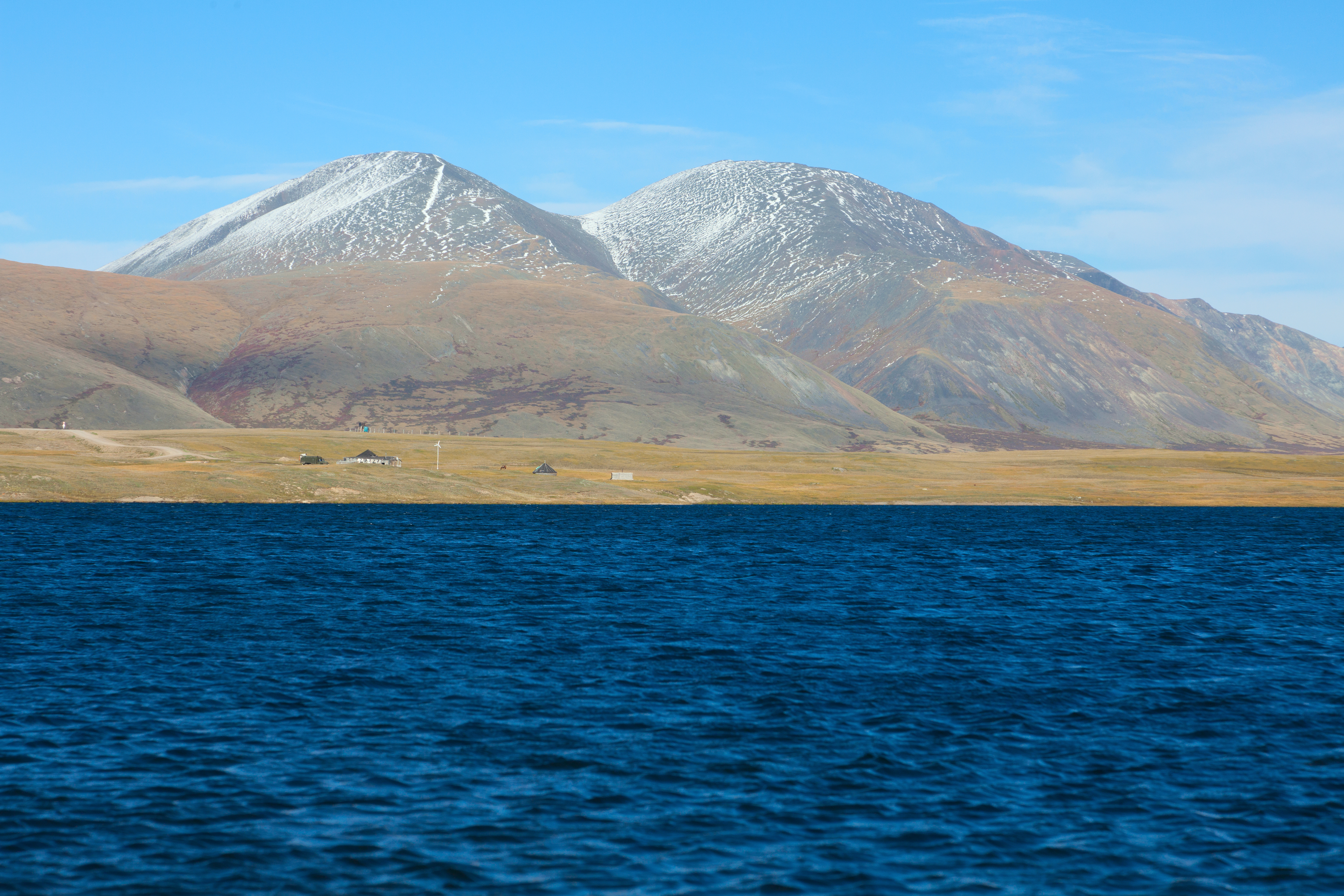
- Tarkhatinskoe Lake on the Ukok Plateau

Geography
- Location within Continental Asia Location within Altai Republic
- Country: Russia
- Federal subject: Altai Republic
- Range coordinates: 49°18′28″N 87°35′41″E

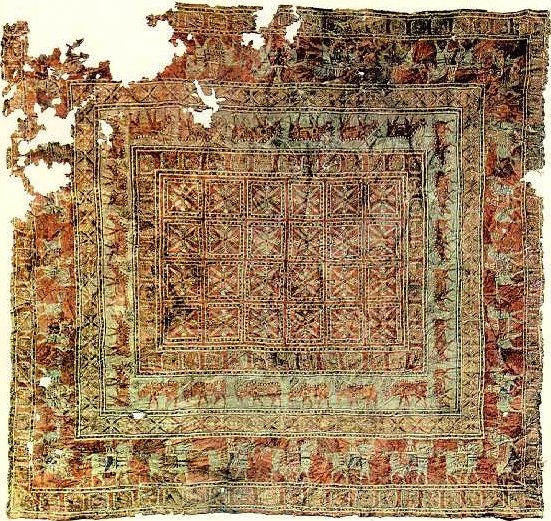
Pazyryk carpet, 5th century BC

Ukok Plateau (Russian: Укок) is a plateau covered by grasslands located in southwestern Siberia, in the Altai Mountains region of Russia near the borders with China, Kazakhstan, and Mongolia. The plateau is recognized as part of the UNESCO World Heritage Site entitled Golden Mountains of Altai as an important environmental treasure. It provides a habitat for many of the world's endangered species, including one of its least studied predatory animals: the snow leopard. Other endangered species protected there include the argali mountain sheep, the steppe eagle, and the black stork. It is also one of the last remaining remnants of the mammoth steppe. There are several threats to the preservation of the Ukok Plateau, including overuse of the steppe by ranchers, a proposed road, and plans for a gas pipeline between China and Russia.

== Terminology ==
The Mongolian word uheg literally means "elongated cabinet", "box", "massive mountain", or big hill with a flat top. According to the oral testimony of S. Umurzakova, ukok in Kyrgyz used to refer to flat-topped mountains, i.e., plateaus.

== Geography ==
The Ukok Plateau is the high, mountainous plain located between South Altai and Sailugem and ridges at a height of 2,200–2,500 m (7,200–8,200 ft) above sea level. There are 500–600-metre-high (1,600–2,000 ft) mountain peaks that tower above the plateau. The highest peak on the plateau is the mountain knot of Tavan-Bogdo-Ula (Five Sacred Peaks), where the highest mountain is Khüiten Peak that reaches 4,374 m (14,350 ft) above sea level. This is the second-highest peak in Siberia after Belukha Mountain. The present-day eastern Altai-Sayan region areas of Ukok-Sailiugem could be considered the closest analogy to the ancient mammoth steppe environment.

== History ==
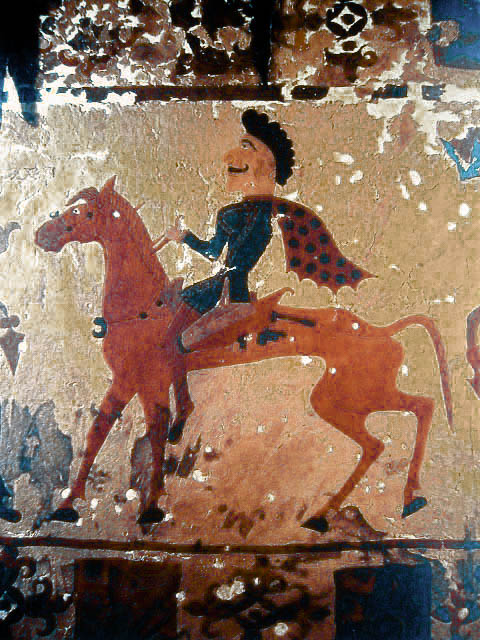
Horseman, Pazyryk felt artifact, c. 300 BC

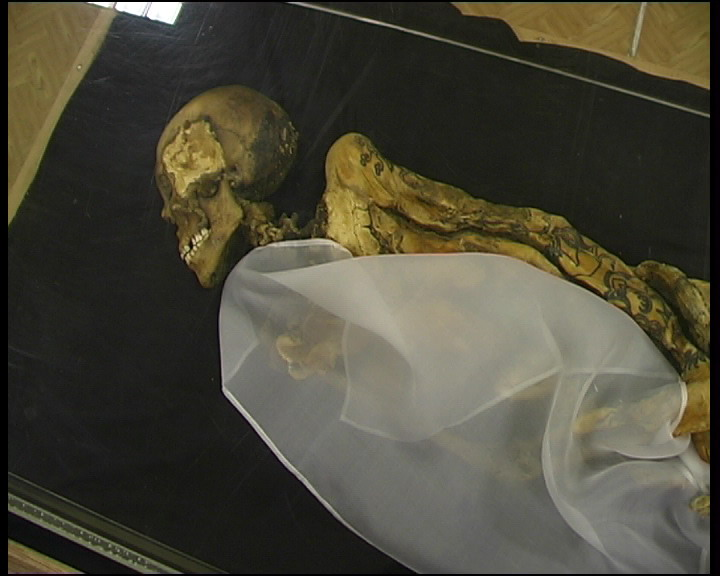
Mummy of the Siberian Ice Maiden

Pazyryk is the name given by modern scholars to an ancient people who lived in the Altai Mountains on this plateau who are associated with some spectacular archeological findings, including mummies found frozen in the permafrost. Many ancient Bronze Age tomb mounds have been found in the area and have been associated with the Pazyryk culture, which closely resembled that of the legendary Scythian people to the west. The term kurgan is in general usage to describe such log-barrow burials. Excavations of this site have continued to yield notable archaeological finds. One famous finding is known as the Ice Maiden, excavated by Russian archaeologist Natalia Polosmak. At least six tattooed mummies dating from the period ca. (c. 2600 BC – AD 402) have been recovered preserved by the permafrost in tombs at sites on the Ukok Plateau including Temrta III, Primorsky I, Ak-Alakha 3, Verkh-Kaldzhin 2, and the Pazyryk burial ground. The Ice Maiden and other archaeological finds were located just within a disputed strip of land between Russia and China. The residents of the Altai Republic are demanding the return of the burial artifacts from their current location in Novosibirsk.

== Transport ==
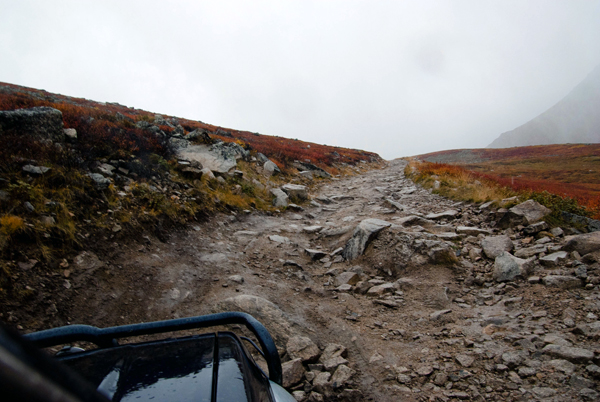
Mountain pass Teplyi kluch, August 2012

The Ukok plateau is linked to the outside world by heavy-going dirt roads through the Ukok (Russia-Kazakhstan border), Ulan-Daba (Russia-Mongolia border), Teplyi kluch, and Kalgutinsky passes. The Teplyi kluch pass is at an altitude of 2,907 m (9,537 ft). One may get to these passes from Kosh-Agach village, which is easily reachable owing to a relatively improved M52 highway (the so-called Chuysky tract).

Southward, beyond Kosh-Agach, the way becomes impassable for common means of transport and passable only for off-road vehicles. However, even they could become stuck in swamp mud in the Kalguty river valley, especially after a sunny day when frozen soil begins thawing. For most of the year the passes are snow-covered and avalanche-prone. During the short summer season all the slopes are prone to solifluction.
