= Ice Maiden Expedition =

British Army expedition in Antarctica (2017–2018)

- Sponsor: British Army
- Country: United Kingdom
- Leader: Major Nics Wetherill
- Start: 17 December 2017
- End: 20 January 2018
- Crew: 6
- Survivors: 6
- Achievements: First all-female team to ski across the Antarctic continent using muscle power alone

The Ice Maiden expedition was a British Army expedition in which six women from the United Kingdom became the first female team to ski across the Antarctic continent using muscle power alone. The Ice Maidens were also the largest team to ski across the continent. The 1,704 km expedition began on 20 November 2017 and finished on 20 January 2018, lasting 62 days.

== Description ==
Starting at the edge of the Ross Ice Shelf, they skied up the Leverett Glacier following the South Pole Traverse route to the Scott-Amundsen South Pole Station, arriving on 17 December 2017. They then skied to Hercules Inlet on the edge of the Ronne Ice Shelf. The team received two planned resupplies en route – at the South Pole and at Thiel Mountains. On average they skied for 10 hours per day, reaching a maximum daily distance of 43 km while pulling a sled weighing 80 kg and experiencing temperatures as low as -40C.

250 women from the British Army applied for the expedition which was open to anybody that was female and medically fit to deploy. They conducted two years of training and team selection in the United Kingdom and Norway. They practiced crevasse rescue techniques in Switzerland before departing for the Antarctic Logistics and Expeditions base in Punta Arenas, Chile in October 2017.

The final team of six included four women from the Regular Army and two members of the Army Reserve and was led by Major Nics Wetherill MBE, RAMC. Major Nics Wetherill received a MBE in the 2019 New Year Honours. Major Wetherill was inspired to organise the expedition after reading about British polar explorer Felicity Aston MBE's solo crossing of Antarctica in 2012, and chose to follow the same route. The primary aim of the Ice Maiden expedition was to inspire women to take up a challenge and discover what they're capable of and the Ice Maidens have since inspired a team of British female fire fighters, the Antarctic Fire Angels, to undertake a crossing of Antarctica in 2023.

The Ice Maiden team took part in medical research studies with University of Edinburgh and the University of Minnesota, feeding into a NASA study researching the psychological impact of teams operating on Mars. The Edinburgh University physiological study compared the reaction of the female body undertaking extreme endurance in extreme environments, with the male physiological reaction. They found that, unlike the men, the women lost fat but no muscle mass. Dr Rob Gifford of Edinburgh University said: “Our findings contain some potentially myth-busting data on the impact of extreme physical activity on women. We have shown that with appropriate training and preparation, many of the previously reported negative health effects can be avoided."

The Countess of Wessex was the expedition's Royal patron and General Tim Radford CB DSO OBE was the military patron. Then Defence Secretary Gavin Williamson said of the Ice Maidens: "I want to congratulate the heroic Ice Maidens on their formidable and trailblazing trek across Antarctica. They are an inspiration to us all and are role models to young people across the country".

Army Sergeant Major Glenn Haughton OBE, the senior non-commissioned officer in the Army, said there could be “no finer display of the values of the British Army”.

== Team members ==
- Maj Nics Wetherill MBE, Royal Army Medical Corps
- Maj Natalie Taylor, Royal Army Medical Corps
- Maj Sandy Hennis, Royal Signals Regiment
- Capt Zanna Baker, Royal Artillery
- Lt Jenni Stephenson, Royal Artillery
- LSgt Sophie Montagne, Honourable Artillery Company
