= Gorno-Altaysk =

Capital of Altai Republic, Russia

Gorno-Altaysk Горно-Алтайск
- Town

Other transcription(s)
  - Altay: Туулу Алтай
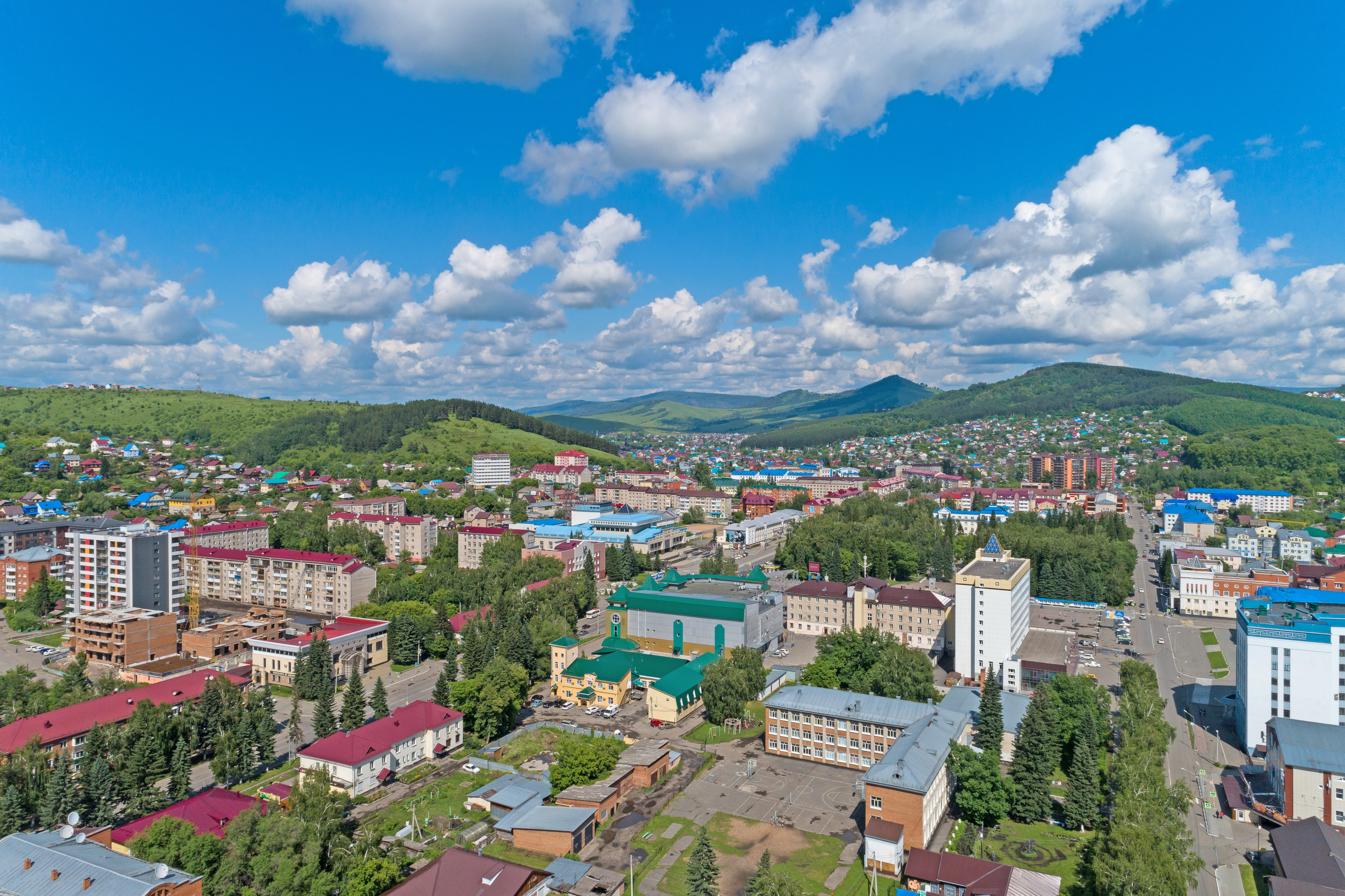
- View of Gorno-Altaysk

- Flag Coat of arms
- Anthem: None (Note: The official symbols of Gorno-Altaysk enumerated in Article 3 of the Charter of Gorno-Altaysk do not include the anthem.)
- Interactive map of Gorno-Altaysk
- Location of Gorno-Altaysk Gorno-Altaysk (Altai Republic)
- Coordinates: 51°57′N 85°58′E
- Country: Russia
- Federal subject: Altai Republic
- Founded: 1824
- Town status since: February 27, 1928

Government
  - Body: Town Council of Deputies
  - Mayor: Olga Safronova

Area
  - Total: 95.5 km^{2} (36.9 sq mi)
- Elevation: 290 m (950 ft)

Population (2010 Census)
  - Total: 56,933
  - Estimate (2025): 64,508 (+13.3%)
  - Rank: 289th in 2010
  - Density: 596/km^{2} (1,540/sq mi)

Administrative status
  - Subordinated to: Gorno-Altaysk Urban Okrug
  - Capital of: Altai Republic
  - Capital of: Gorno-Altaysk Urban Okrug

Municipal status
  - Urban okrug: Gorno-Altaysk Urban Okrug
  - Capital of: Gorno-Altaysk Urban Okrug
- Time zone: UTC+6 (MSK+3)
- Postal codes: 649000, 649002, 649006, 649007, 649700
- Dialing code: +7 38822
- OKTMO ID: 84701000001
- Website: www.gornoaltaysk.ru

Gorno-Altaysk (Russian: Го́рно-Алта́йск, romanized: Gorno-Altaysk, Russian pronunciation: [ˈgornə ɐlˈtajsk]; Altay: Улалу, romanized: Ulalu; historically, pre-1932: Ulala) is the capital town of the Altai Republic, Russia.

The population stands at around 64,000 people as of 2020 with steady growth over the recent years. In the past, the town was known as Ulala (until June 23, 1932) and then Oyrot-Tura (June 23, 1932 - January 7, 1948).

Historical population
Year	Pop.	±%
1926	5,691	—
1939	24,045	+322.5%
1959	27,534	+14.5%
1970	34,413	+25.0%
1979	40,296	+17.1%
1989	46,436	+15.2%
2002	53,538	+15.3%
2010	56,933	+6.3%
2021	65,342	+14.8%
Source: Census data

== History ==
The selo of Ulala (Улала) was established in 1824 when migrants moved to this area from Biysk. When Oirot Autonomous Oblast was established on June 1, 1922, Ulala became its administrative center. On February 27, 1928, Ulala was granted town status and on June 23, 1932, it was renamed Oyrot-Tura (Ойрот-Тура). The present name was given to the town on January 7, 1948.

In 1994 a monument was erected on Lenin Street in memory of those executed in the 1930s.

== Climate ==
Gorno-Altaysk has a humid continental climate (Köppen Dfb) characterised by frigid winters and warm to very warm summers. Precipitation is moderate and is much higher in the hotter summer months than in the frigid winter season, when it falls entirely as low-water-content snow.

Climate data for Gorno-Altaysk (1981-2010)
Month	Jan	Feb	Mar	Apr	May	Jun	Jul	Aug	Sep	Oct	Nov	Dec	Year
Mean daily maximum °C (°F)	−9.2 (15.4)	−7.5 (18.5)	0.0 (32.0)	10.5 (50.9)	19.7 (67.5)	25.2 (77.4)	26.8 (80.2)	24.2 (75.6)	18.6 (65.5)	8.8 (47.8)	−1.4 (29.5)	−8 (18)	9.0 (48.2)
Daily mean °C (°F)	−14.2 (6.4)	−13.3 (8.1)	−5.8 (21.6)	4.5 (40.1)	12.8 (55.0)	18.5 (65.3)	20.3 (68.5)	17.8 (64.0)	12.2 (54.0)	3.9 (39.0)	−5.7 (21.7)	−12.6 (9.3)	3.2 (37.8)
Mean daily minimum °C (°F)	−19.1 (−2.4)	−19.1 (−2.4)	−11.5 (11.3)	−1.5 (29.3)	5.9 (42.6)	11.8 (53.2)	13.9 (57.0)	11.4 (52.5)	5.8 (42.4)	−1 (30)	−10 (14)	−17.1 (1.2)	−2.5 (27.5)
Average precipitation mm (inches)	16 (0.6)	16 (0.6)	16 (0.6)	29 (1.1)	57 (2.2)	62 (2.4)	73 (2.9)	67 (2.6)	47 (1.9)	41 (1.6)	26 (1.0)	22 (0.9)	472 (18.4)
Source: "Climate Data – Russia".

== Administrative and municipal status ==
Gorno-Altaysk is the capital of the republic. Within the framework of administrative divisions, it is incorporated as Gorno-Altaysk Urban Okrug—an administrative unit with the status equal to that of the districts. As a municipal division, this administrative unit also has urban okrug status.

== Transportation ==
The town is served by the Gorno-Altaysk Airport, with regular flights to the city of Moscow and a few other major Russian cities.

Highway M52 passes through Gorno-Altaysk, connecting it with Novosibirsk in the north and the Mongolian border in the south.

The closest railway station is 96 kilometers (60 mi) from Gorno-Altaysk. It is located in the city of Biysk.

== Culture, sports and education ==
The town hosts a theater as well as several cinemas, the Gorno-Altaisk State University, and the Anokhin Museum. The mountains located within the town's boundaries are a magnet for skiing as well as backpacking. Several football fields with artificial grass are available to the public for free.

== Infrastructure condition ==
Only the most vital streets in Gorno-Altaysk are kept in good condition as of 2020. The rivers are safe to swim in and the tap water is safe to drink. Most of the buildings have central heating, usually powered by a gas burning station serving either one or several buildings.
