= Early Anatolian animal carpets =

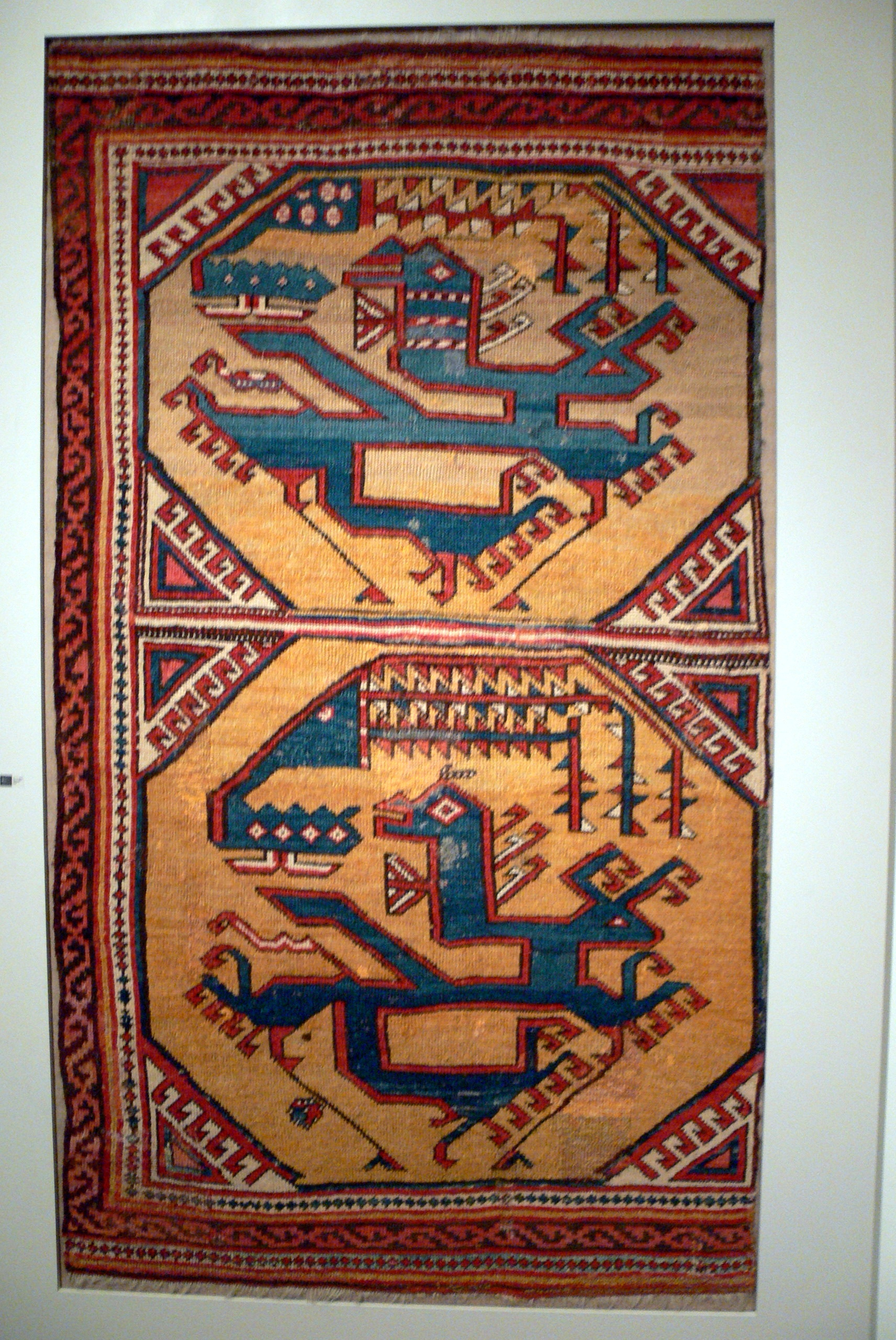
Phoenix and Dragon carpet, 164 x 91 cm, Anatolia, circa 1500, Pergamon Museum, Berlin

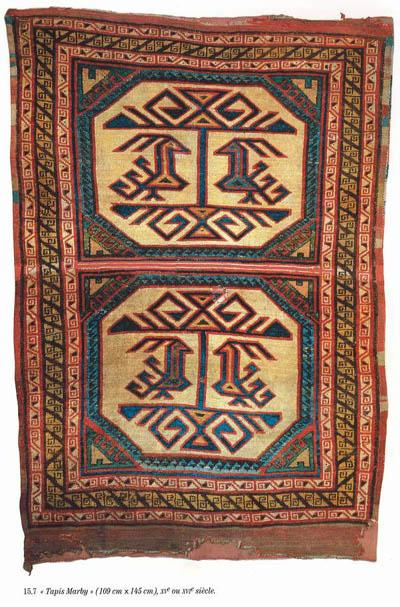
Animal carpet, around 1500, found in Marby Church, Jämtland, Sweden. Wool, 160 cm x 112 cm, Swedish History Museum, Stockholm

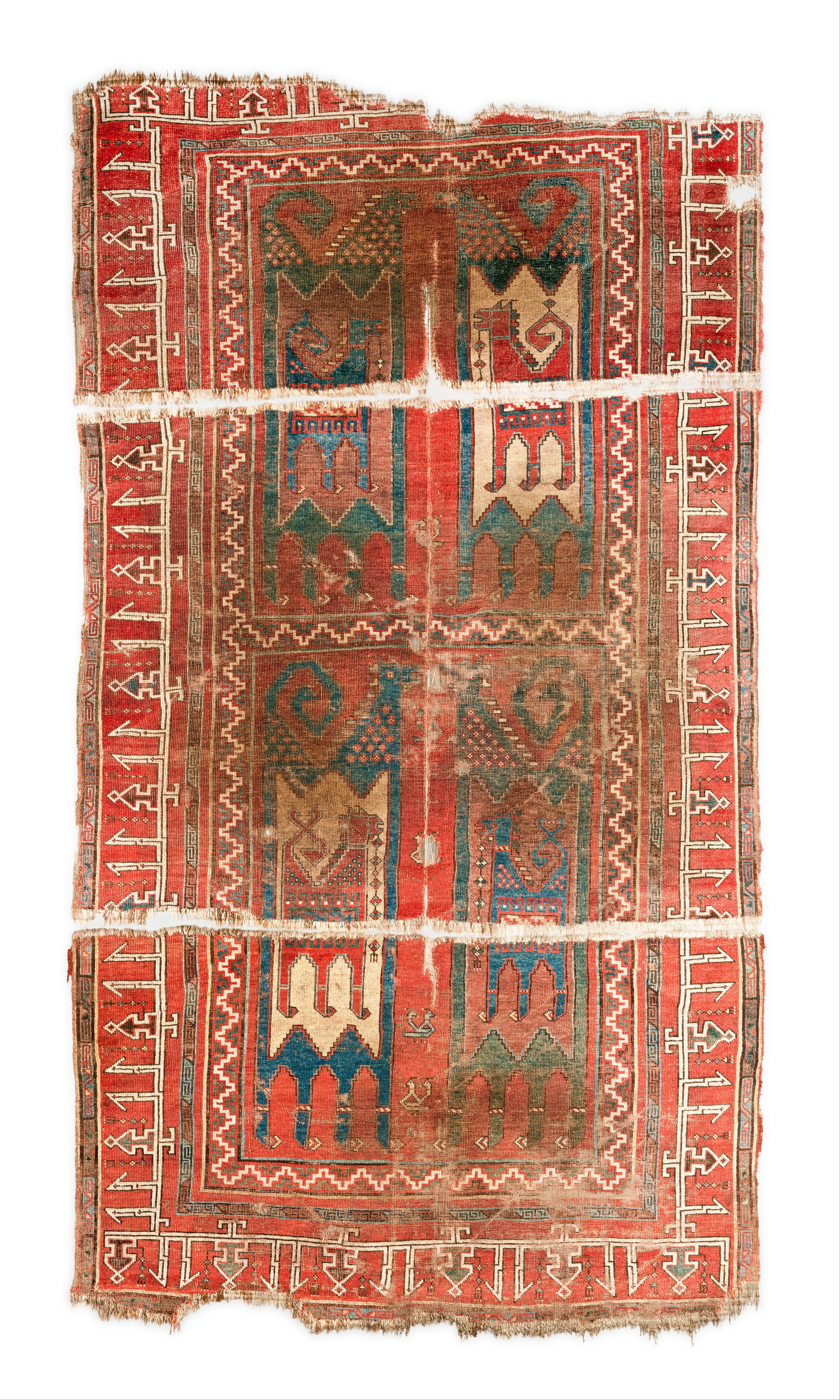
Animal carpet, Turkey, dated to the 11th–13th century, Museum of Islamic Art, Doha

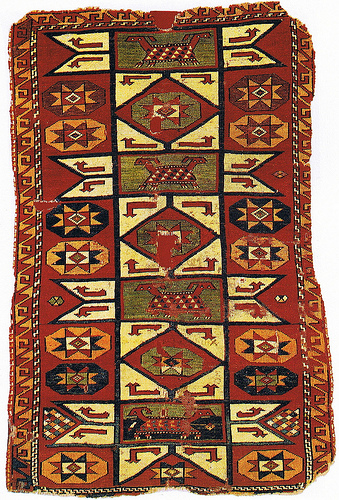
Anatolian Animal carpet, 1500 or earlier, wool, symmetric knots. Pergamon Museum Inv. No. KGM 1885, 984

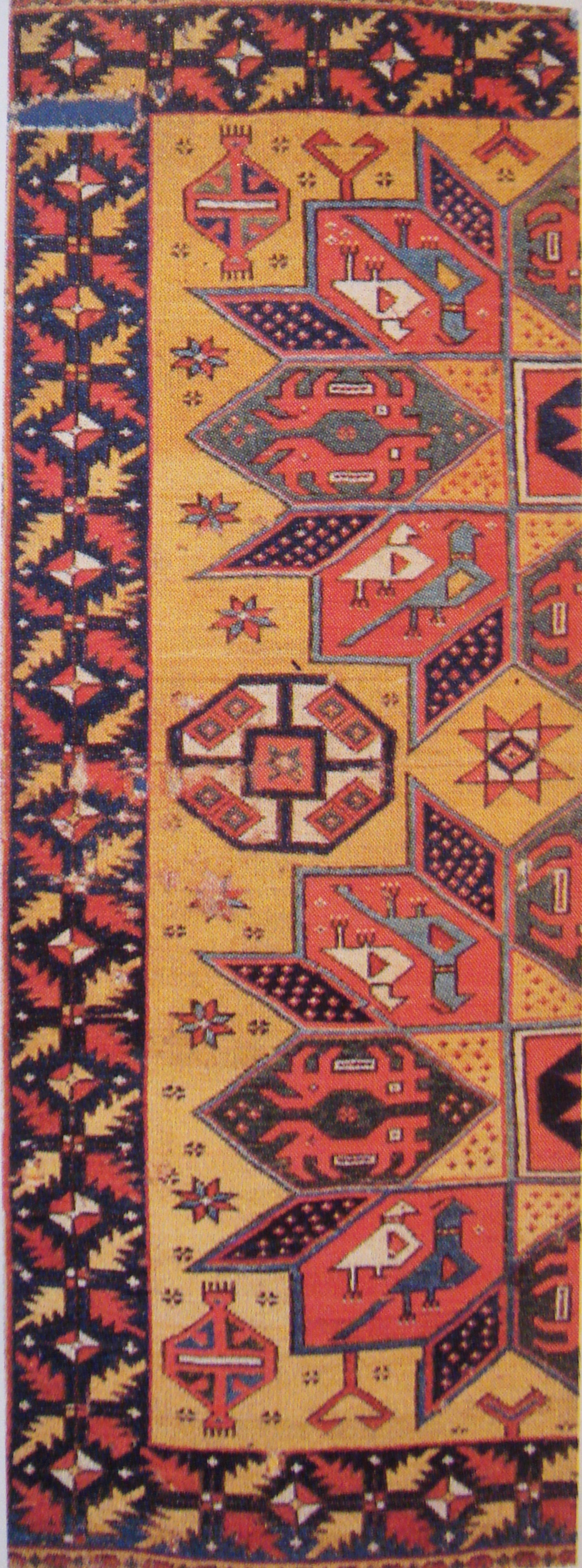
"Batári-Crivelli" rug, Anatolia, 15th century, Museum of Applied Arts (Budapest)

Anatolian animal carpets represent a special type of pile-woven carpet, woven in the geographical region of Anatolia during the Seljuq and early Ottoman period, corresponding to the 14th–16th century. Very few animal-style carpets still exist today, and most of them are in a fragmentary state. Animal carpets were frequently depicted by Western European painters of the 14th–16th century. By comparison of the few surviving carpets with their painted counterparts, these paintings helped to establish a timeline of their production, and support our knowledge about the early Turkish carpet.

== Surviving carpets ==
=== Dragon and Phoenix carpet ===
A traditional Chinese motif, the fight between the fenghuang, or Chinese phoenix, and the dragon, is seen in an Anatolian carpet at the Pergamon Museum, Berlin. Radiocarbon dating confirmed that the "Dragon and Phoenix" carpet was woven in the mid 15th century, during the early Ottoman Empire. It is knotted with symmetric knots. The Chinese motif was probably introduced into Islamic art by the Mongols, or artists working for them, during the thirteenth century.

The Dragon and Phoenix carpet lacks his original borders, and seems to be cut off at the right side. Its field is parted into two rectangular sections, each containing a yellow-ground octagon in which a Chinese dragon and a phoenix are opposed to each other in combat. Both animals are stylized in geometrical form. Their blue colours, outlined in red, contrasts well with the yellow ground of the octagon. The design of the upper octagon appears to be somewhat more compressed than the lower. The corners between the octagon and the rectangular field are filled in with red triangles and rows of white hooks on red ground, creating a reciprocal hook design. The rectangular fields are surrounded by a small guardian border showing a row of pearls in different colours. The main border has red floral tendrils composed of identical, S-like ornaments on a brown ground.

The Phoenix and Dragon carpet was first described in 1881 by Julius Lessing, and Wilhelm von Bode in 1895. Since then the Dragon and Phoenix carpet has been referred to in many books on Oriental carpets.

A similar fragment was discovered in Fustat, with dragon and phoenix depicted in combat on a yellow field. The animals in this fragment are depicted in red, and outlined in blue. The minor border shows a variant of the "kufic" borders known from other Seljuq period carpets.

=== Marby rug ===
Another carpet showing two medallions with two birds besides a tree was found in the Swedish church of Marby in Jämtland province; it is now in the Swedish History Museum in Stockholm. The rug was radiocarbon dated to 1300–1420. More fragments of this type were found in Fostat, today a suburb of the city of Cairo. The Marby rug is divided into two rectangles, each containing an octagon with a tree and a pair of birds. The tree is mirrored along the horizontal middle axis of the octagon in a way which suggests its image is reflected in water.

Both the Phoenix and Dragon, and the Marby rug, have additional rows of knots on their backsides. At a distance of every 6 cm, rows of loosely tied knots of red thread are woven in. Another carpet fragment from Fustat has similar additional knots. It has been suggested that these rows of knots mark the weaver's progress during a given time. On average, the additional knots are repeated every 15 rows in the Dragon and Phoenix rug. At an estimated original width of 1 m, about 3800 knots were woven between two rows of the additional red knots, consistent with the dimensions of the carpet and the number of knots a single weaver can tie in a carpet during a day.(Beselin 2011, p. 46–49)

=== Animal carpet at the Metropolitan Museum ===
The "Dragon and Phoenix" and the "Marby" rugs were the only existing examples of Anatolian animal carpets known until 1988. Since then, seven more carpets of this type have been found. They survived in Tibetan monasteries and were removed by monks fleeing to Nepal during the Chinese cultural revolution. One of these carpets was acquired by the Metropolitan Museum of Art which parallels a painting by the Sienese artist Gregorio di Cecco: "The Marriage of the Virgin", 1423. It shows large confronted animals, each with a smaller animal inside.

=== Animal carpets from the Vakıflar Museum ===
The field of an animal carpet in the Vakıflar Museum, Istanbul (Inv. No. E-1) is divided into two rectangular compartments by a band similar to its borders. An octagon containing confronted animals is inscribed into each compartment. The winged animals face a stylized tree. They show a down-turned, snout-like head, to which antler-like extensions are attached, and their body is spotted. Overall, the animals more resemble fallow deer than birds, which are usually depicted on animal carpets. Deer and fallow deer are already depicted on the borders of the Pazyryk carpet, and are frequently seen on early textiles and other objects in Anatolia and Iran. Below each deer, and above the main animal, is a bird-like quadruped.

Another animal carpet with a coarser design compared to the Vakıflar rug is at the Mevlana Museum in Konya (Balpınar, 1988, p. 62).

=== Animal carpet from the Pergamon Museum ===
Another carpet in the Pergamon Museum was dated to before 1500 AD. It shows four double-headed quadrupeds within a rectangular field surrounded by an eight-pointed star. The uppermost star is cut off. The stars are framed by smaller octagonal ornaments, two at their sides, one each at the top and bottom of each star. A smaller guardian border separates the field from the main border, which shows stylized leaves adorning S-shaped ornaments. Smaller triangular elements of the design and the outlines of the animals are woven in offset knotting. By its colours, the carpet has been localized to Central Anatolia. On the reverse of the carpet, additional wefts can be seen meandering over two warps after about every 22 regular wefts. The additional weft changes its colour from yellow to red, roughly at the middle of the carpet. It has been interpreted to show a day's work of two weavers working besides each other. If taken as such, the number of knots woven by each weaver would amount to roughly 2,500 knots per day. (Beselin 2011, p. 50–1) See: knot density.

=== Batári-Crivelli fragment, Museum of Applied Arts, Budapest ===
The animal carpet fragment is approximately half the original size. Its field contains two large, 16-pointed star medallions of identical design which both include an eight-pointed star within an octagon. In every second segment of the medallions two birds appear, alternating with two four-legged animals. The field between the medallions is ornamented with smaller rosettes and eight-pointed stars. Each corner contains a mosque lamp ornament. In the center of the long side an octagonal smaller medallion is inserted. The Batári-Crivelli fragment resembles the "Dragon and Phoenix" and "Marby" rugs in having a yellow ground and two large medallions as the main element of design. Chromatographic analysis of the dyes revealed yellow from an undefined plant, indigo blue, madder (Rubia tinctorum) red, a blue green derived from indigo, Dyer's weed (Reseda luteola), and Dyer's sage (Salvia fruticosa), dark brown and undyed, ivory wool. During the 13th International Congress of Turkish Art, held in Budapest on 3 September 2007, the fragment was renamed in honour of Ferenc Batári, the late curator of the carpet and textile department of the museum.

Other animal carpets are at the Museum of Islamic Art, Doha and in private collections.

== Animal carpets in Renaissance painting ==
Animal-style carpets begin to appear in Italian paintings in the 14th, and continue to be depicted in Western European paintings throughout the 15th century. They represent the earliest Oriental carpets which were identified in Renaissance painting. The comparison of animal-style carpets on Renaissance paintings, for which the painter and the date of origin are often known, allows for the determination of a "terminus ante quem" date for existing carpets of similar design. Wilhelm von Bode identified a carpet on Domenico di Bartolo's 1440 painting The Marriage of the Foundlings with marked similarities to the "Dragon and Phoenix" carpet. This marks the beginning of the "ante quem" method, which was subsequently further elaborated by the "Berlin School" of History of Islamic Art. By this method, a variety of existing carpets could be dated by comparison to their painted counterparts.

The illustrated rugs are generally drawn by the early Renaissance painters in a simplified manner, compared to the original carpet designs. The artists may sometimes have painted the animals out of their imagination, but the general appearance of the painted rugs still resembles the originals.

A general compositional analysis of the animal-style rugs from Renaissance paintings was first developed by Kurt Erdmann. The field of animal carpets is usually divided into rectangular compartments, large or small. Each compartment contains an octagon, which in turn contains animal figures of four types:

1. "Heraldic" animals, including single- or double-headed eagles;
2. A pair of birds and a tree;
3. Single birds or quadrupeds in a geometric frame;
4. Paired animals within a frame, sometimes depicted in combat.

=== 14th century ===
At the beginning of the 14th century, carpets with stylized single- or double-headed eagles appear. These are frequently seen in paintings of the Siena and Florence school. During the second half of the 14th century, stylized birds opposing a tree appear in Lippo Memmi's Virgin Mary and Child, 1340–50, and in Sano di Pietro's Marriage of the Virgin, 1448-52. Yetkin has identified a similar rug in the Vakıflar Halı Museum, Istanbul (Yetkin 1981, plate 17). The field of this rug is arranged in the common style, with birds facing a tree, but the birds are crested, and their design is more elaborate. The corners of the composition are filled with animal motifs, perhaps dragons. An animal-style rug with this more developed design appears on a painting by William Larkin (Yetkin, 1981, p. 28).

A carpet fragment with a single bird with its head turned is now in the collection of the Metropolitan Museum of Art, New York. A painted counterpart can be seen in Niccolò di Buonaccorso's "Marriage of the Virgin", 1380.

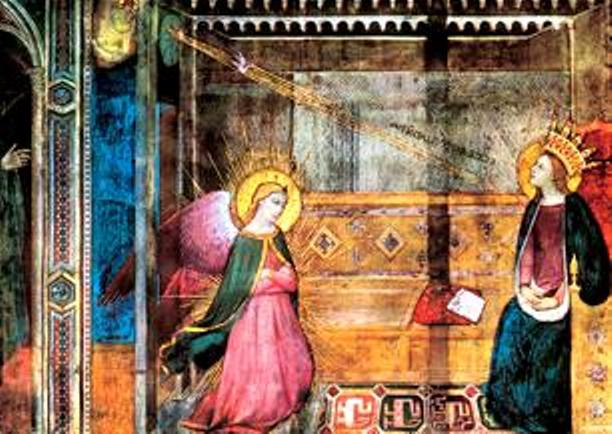
One of the first Oriental carpets in a European painting, attributed to the legendary Friar Bartolomeo, Annunciation, 13th Century, the Church of Santissima Annunziata, Florence.

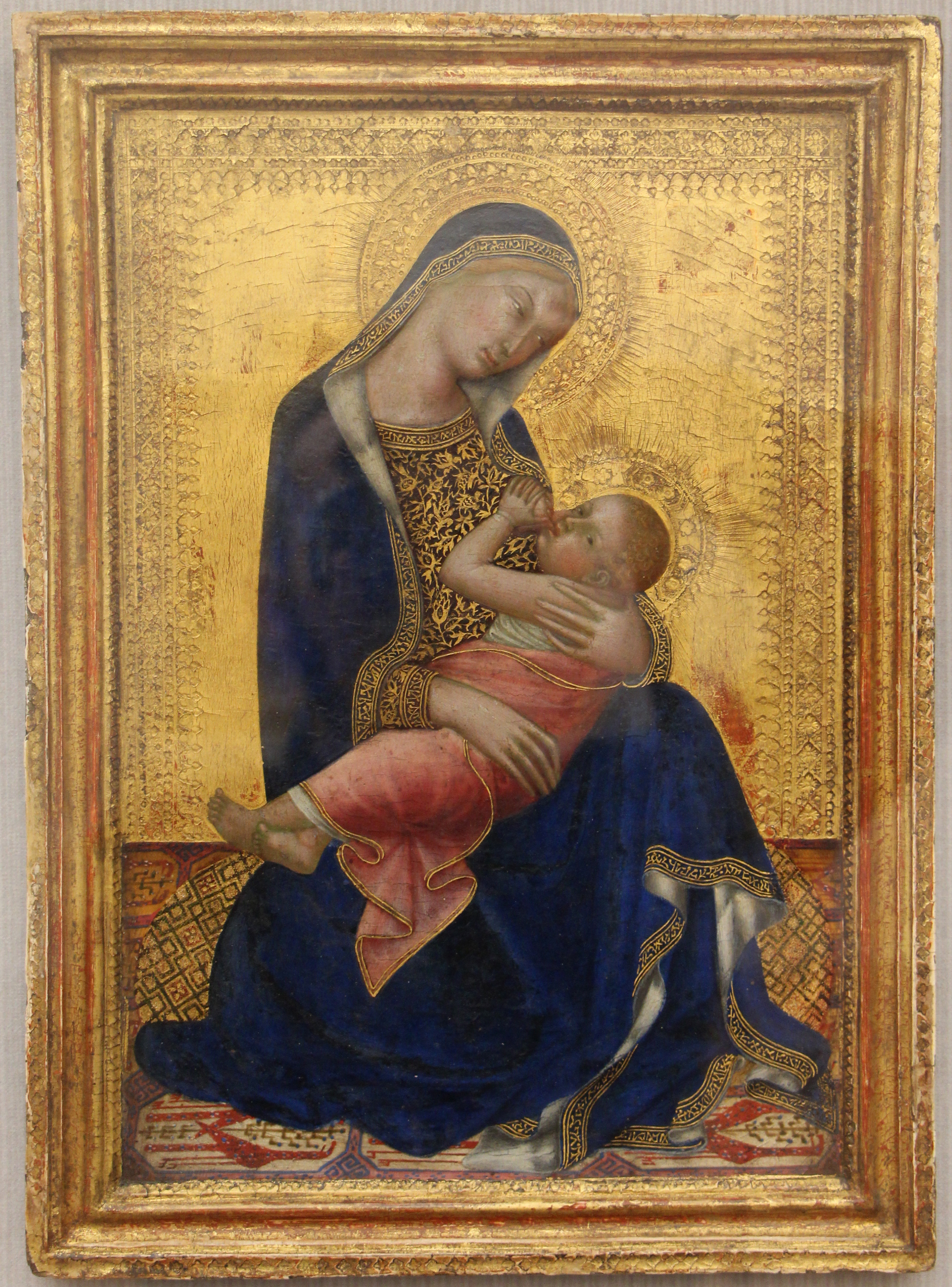
Lippo Memmi's Virgin Mary and Child features an "animal carpet" with two opposed birds besides a tree, 1340–50

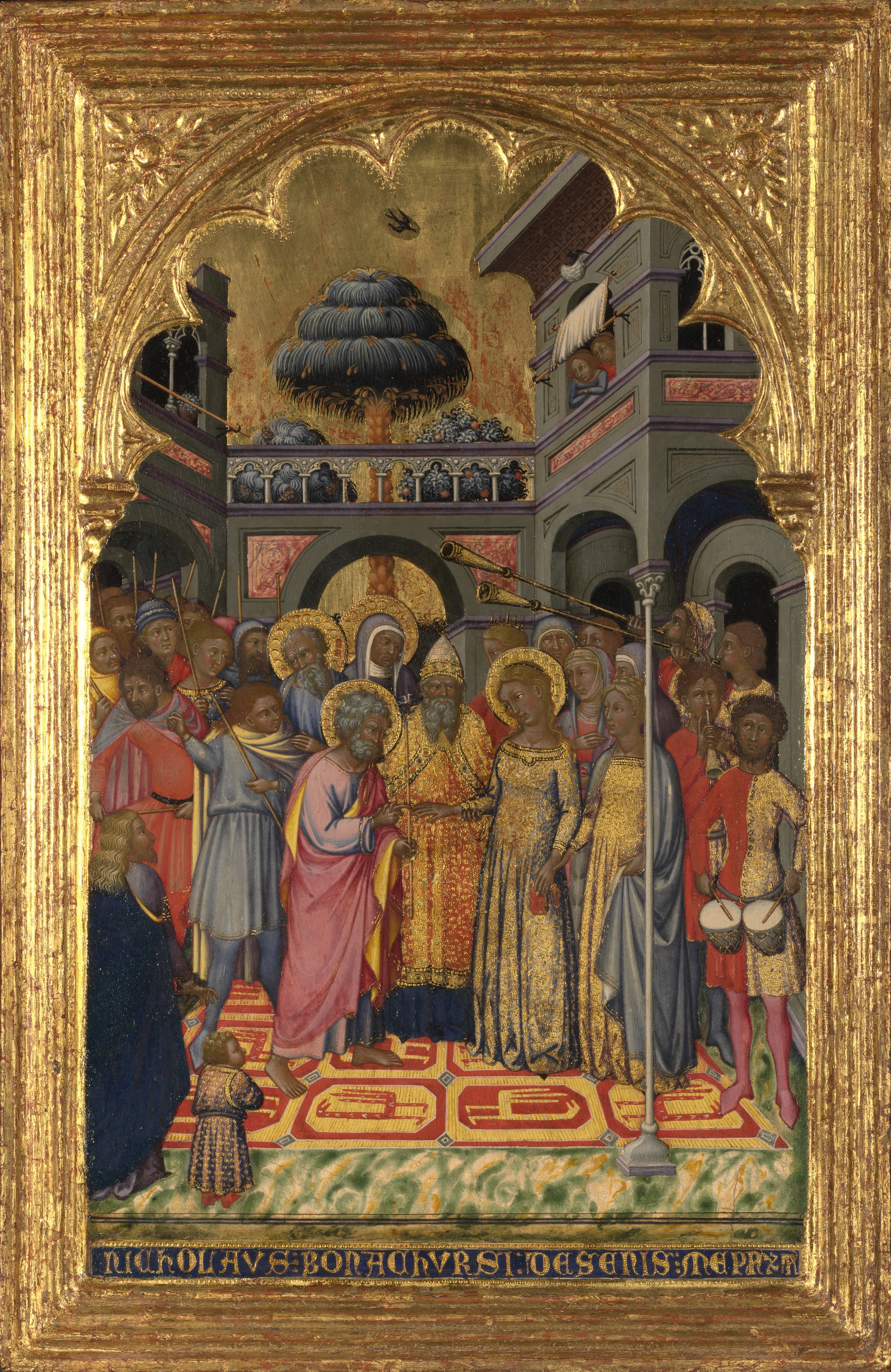
Niccolò di Buonaccorso, Marriage of the Virgin, 1380. National Gallery, London

=== 15th – 16th century ===
By the beginning of the 15th century, the variations of the animal design increase:

Two animal-style carpet fragments from Fustat were dated to the 15th century. They contain parts of a different version of the tree-and-birds pattern seen in the Marby rug. The field is no longer divided into fields, and the tree-and-paired birds pattern appear in offset rows, covering the field in endless repeat (Yetkin, 1981, p. 29, plates 18,19).

A fresco in the Palais des Papes at Avignon, by Matteo di Giovanni depicts a carpet with rather indistinct bird figures in front of the Pope's throne. Written sources of the 14th century indicate that Pope Benedict XII very much liked a carpet with "white swans", which he had set before his throne. A painting by Giovanni di Paolo, 1440, shows an Anatolian animal style rug with birds spread before the pope's throne (Yetkin, 1981, p. 33, ill. 5 and 6).

Various examples are known of paintings with single birds in rows without the rectangular field partition. A rug in the Konya Archaeological Museum, dated to the 15th century, represents an original from this group (Yetkin, 1981, p. 31, plate 20). A painting by Jaume Huguet in the Museu Nacional d'Art de Catalunya contains a nearly identical rug. Similar rugs can be seen in a painting by Giovanni di Paolo in the Doria Pamphilj Gallery, Rome, and in "Madonna enthroned" by Ambrogio Lorenzetti (Yetkin, 1981, p. 34, ill. 7 and 8). Another animal-type carpet of different design appears in Carlo Crivelli's "Annunciation", 1482. The design of this rug consists of stylized animal figures arranged between eight-pointed stars. A paired animal rug can be seen on Fra Angelico's San Marco Altarpiece.

The Pergamon Museum's "Phoenix and Dragon" finds its painted counterparts in Domenico di Bartolo's "The Marriage of the Foundlings" (1440) shows a very similar rug, as well as Alesso Baldovinetti's "Tale of Saint Vincenzo Ferrerio", and Jacopo Bellini's "Annunciation".

The Vakıflar Museum's animal carpet has a painted counterpart in William Larkin's "Portrait of Dorothy Cary, later Viscountess Rochford". The animals shown in the painted rug are very similar to the small bird-like animals in the Vakıflar carpet. As known so far, the carpet depicted in Larkin's portrait is the last of its kind, and the last animal carpet seen in a Western European painting (Balpınar, 1988, p. 62, Yetkin, 1981, p. 36).

The Batári-Crivelli fragment finds its parallel in two paintings by Carlo Crivelli, the Annunciation of 1482 in the Städel museum in Frankfurt and the Annunciation, with Saint Emidius in the National Gallery (1486). Both paintings depict a carpet with a sixteen-pointed star motif, with some compartments containing highly stylised animal motifs.

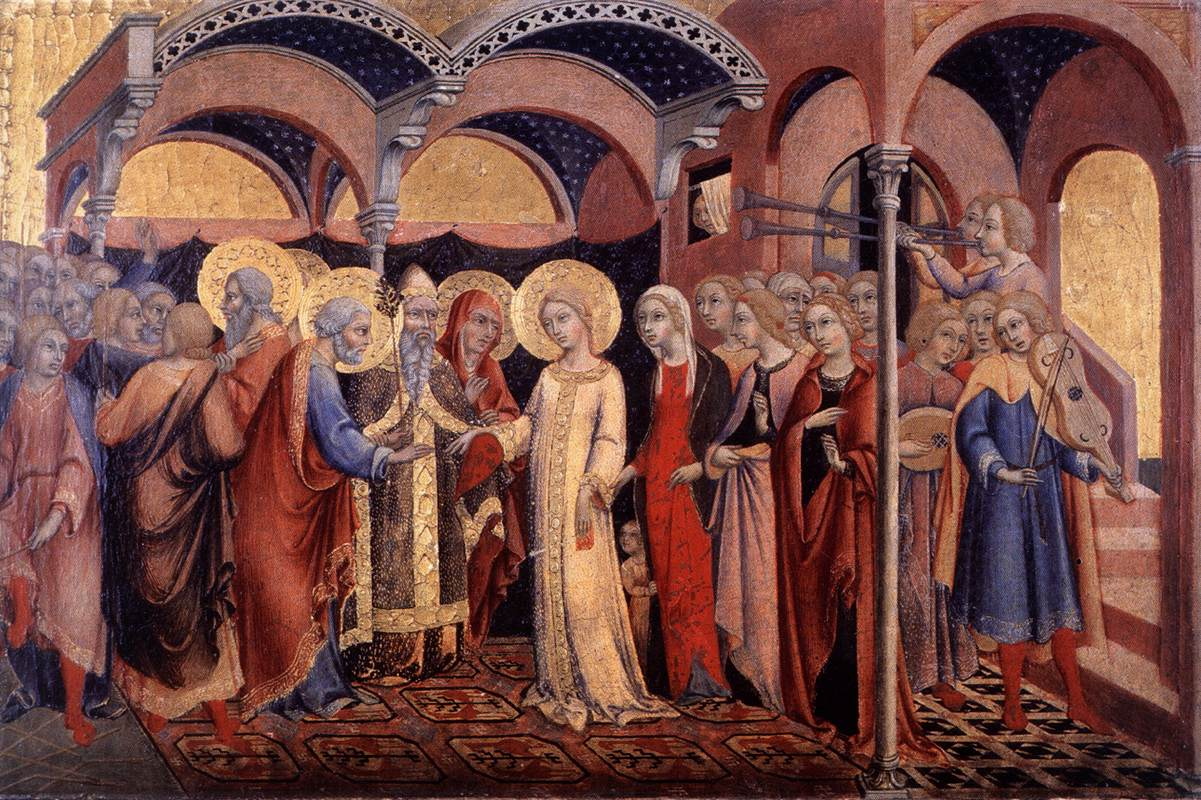
Sano di Pietro, Marriage of the Virgin, 1448–52, Pinacoteca Vaticana

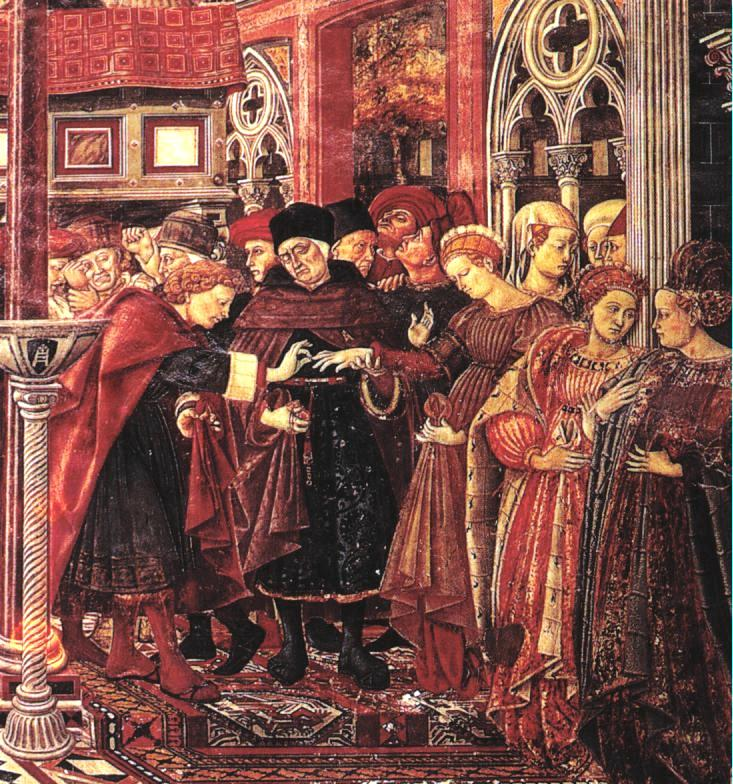
Domenico di Bartolo's The Marriage of the Foundlings features a large carpet with a Chinese-inspired phoenix-and-dragon pattern, 1440

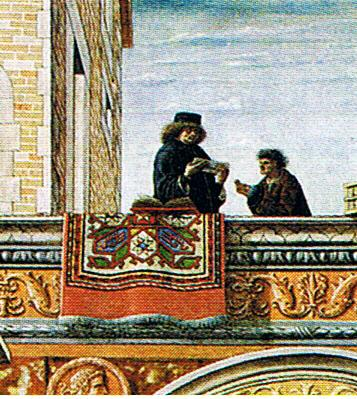
Carlo Crivelli, detail of Annunciation, with Saint Emidius, 1486. National Gallery, London

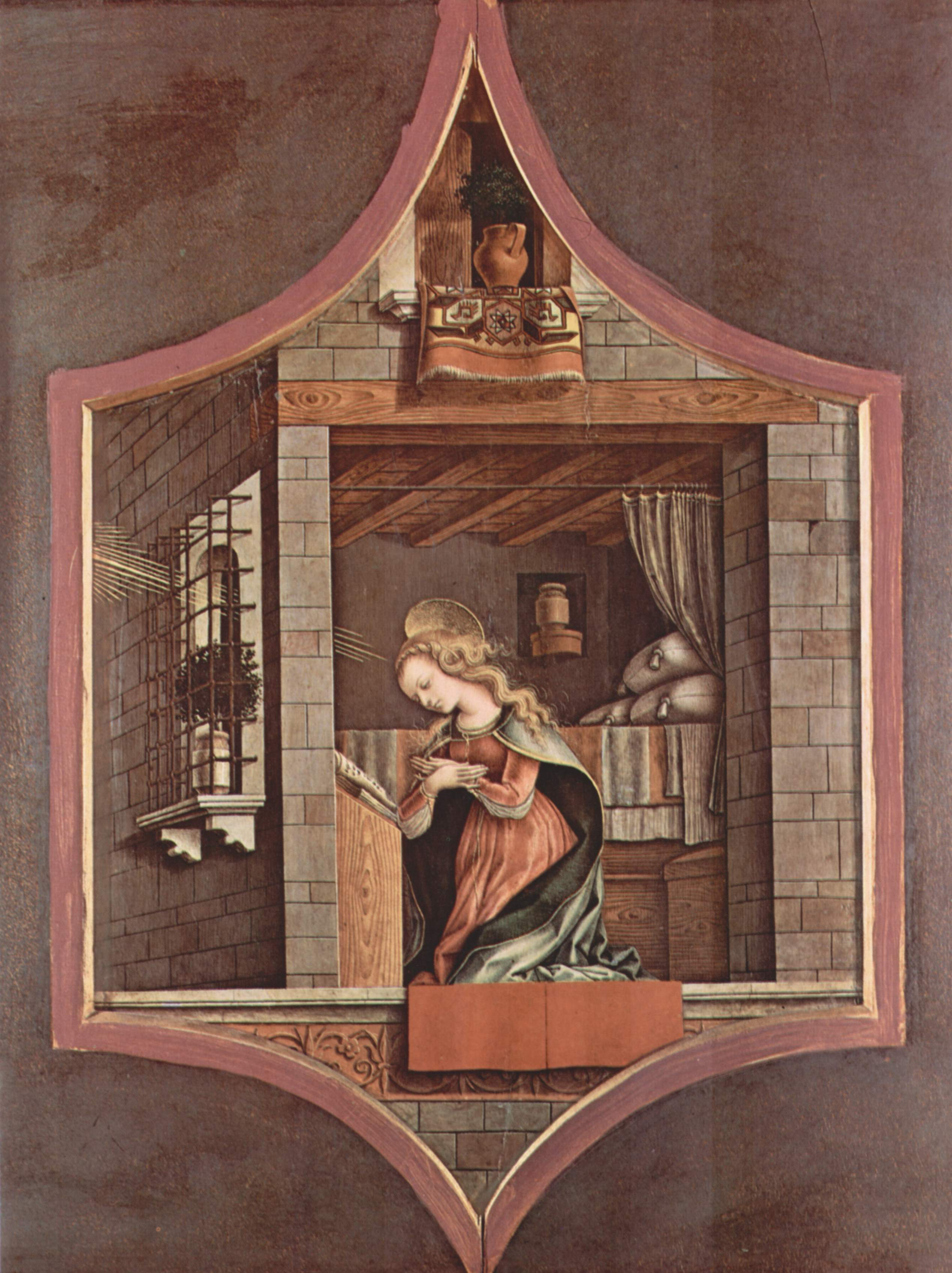
Carlo Crivelli, "Annunciation", 1482. Tempera on poplar. Städel, Frankfurt am Main, Inv. 841A

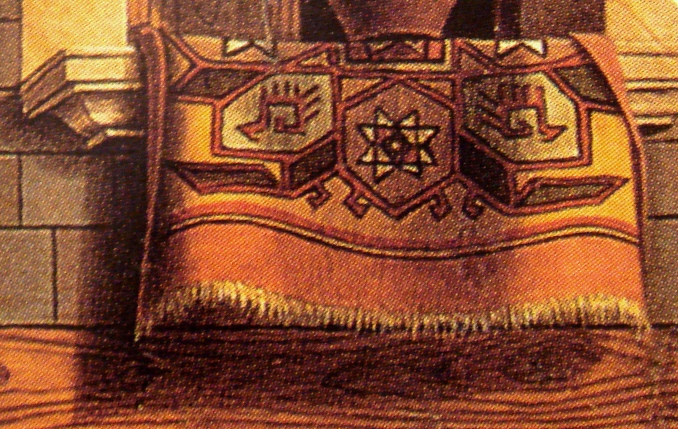
Carlo Crivelli Annunciation (detail), Städel, Frankfurt am Main, 1482

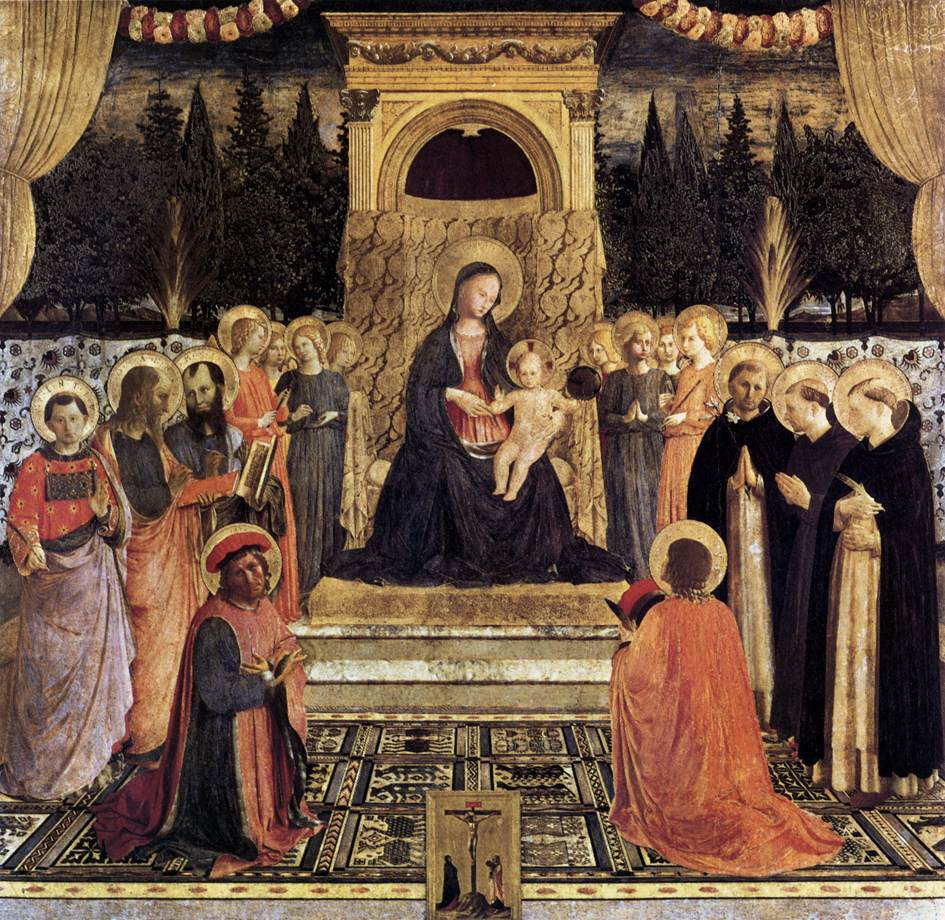
Fra Angelico, San Marco Altarpiece, 1438–43

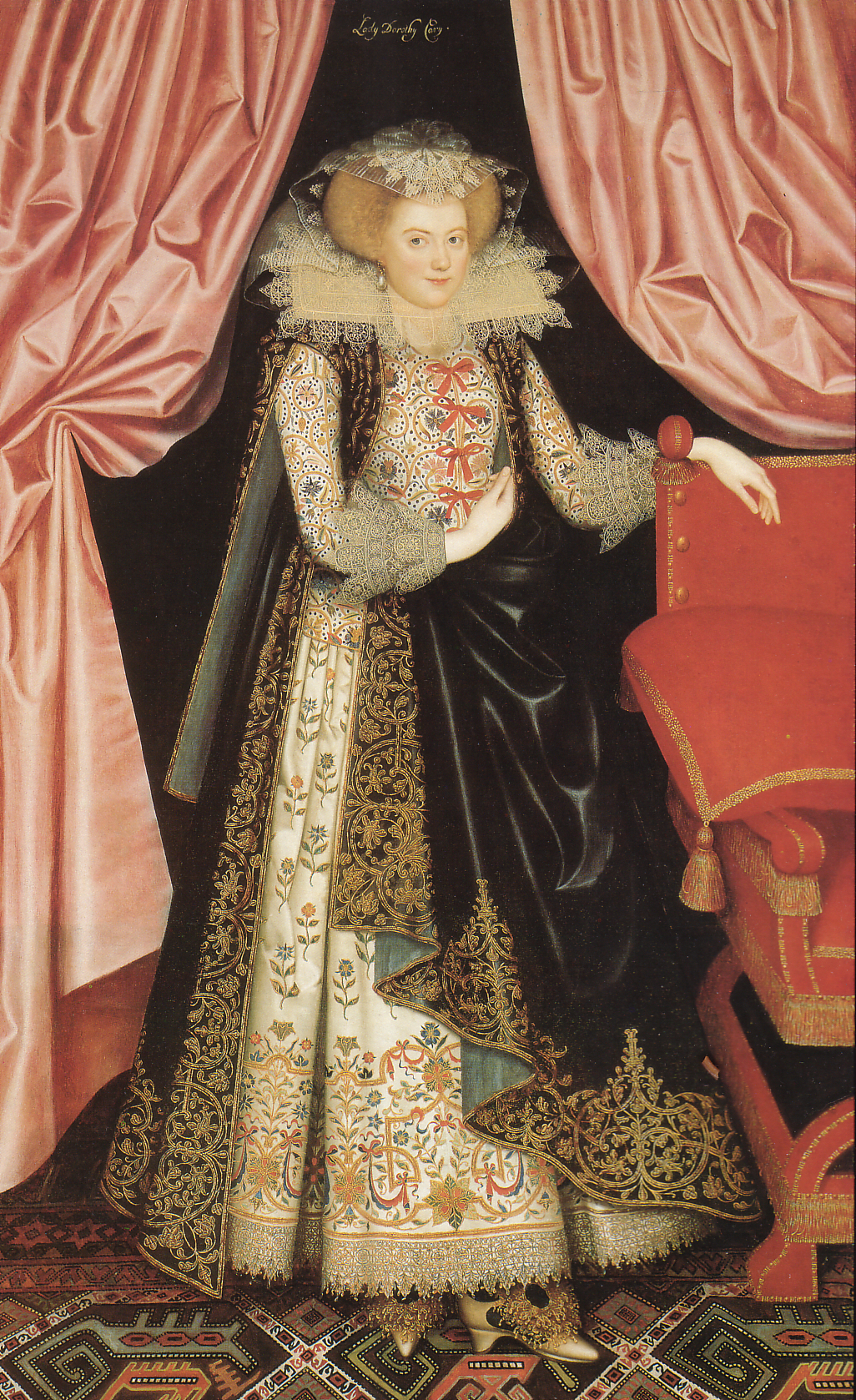
William Larkin, Dorothy Cary, later Viscountess Rochford, 1614–8, Kenwood House
