= Pazyryk burials =

Iron Age tombs in the Altai Mountains of Russia

Coordinates: 50°44′47″N 88°04′21″E

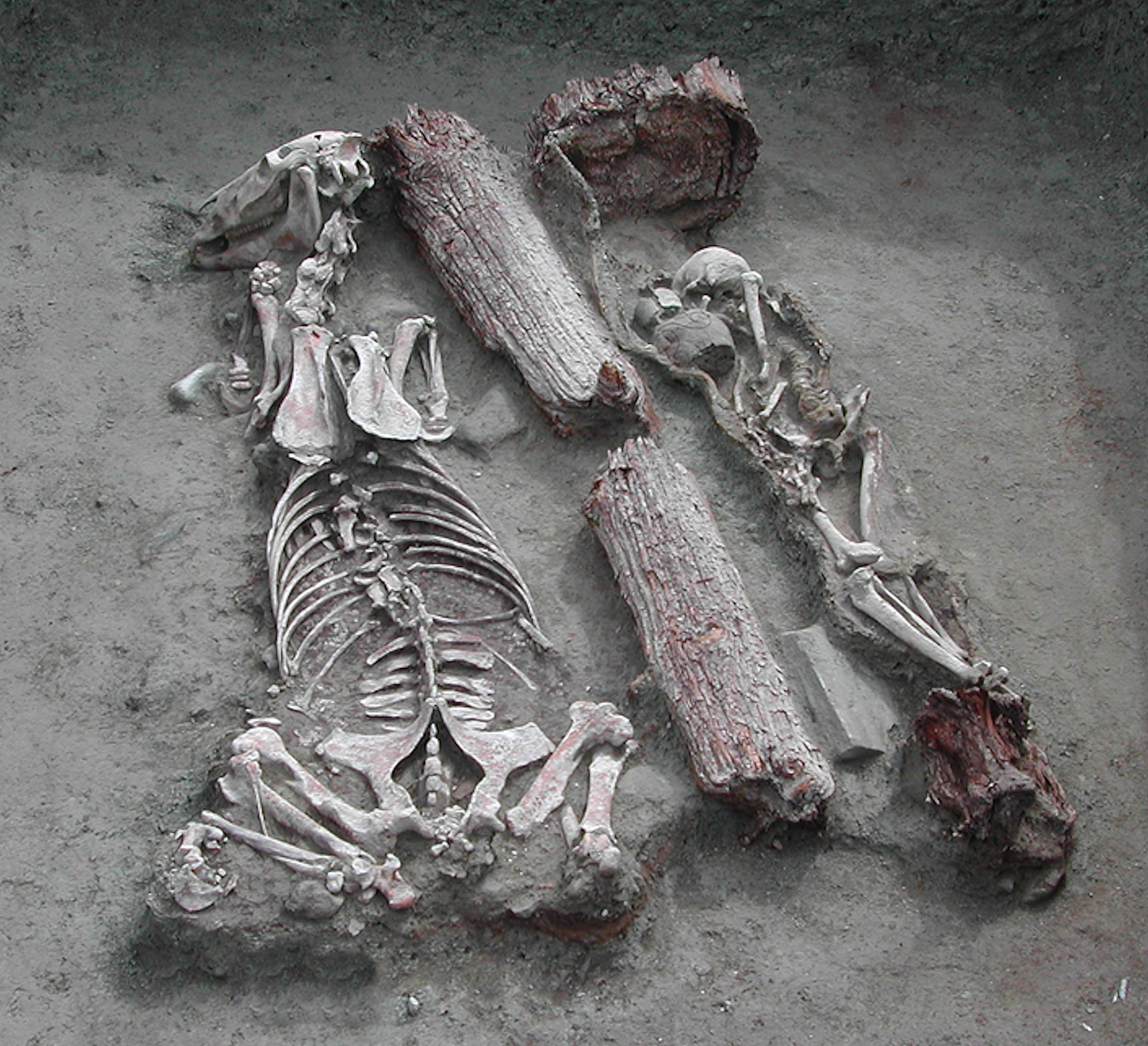
- Pazyryk burial from Baga Türgen River site: a man in a wooden coffin, next to his horse. Bayan-Ölgii, Western Mongolia.
- Material: Tombs
- Created: 4th–3rd century BCE
- Discovered: Pazyryk,

Location

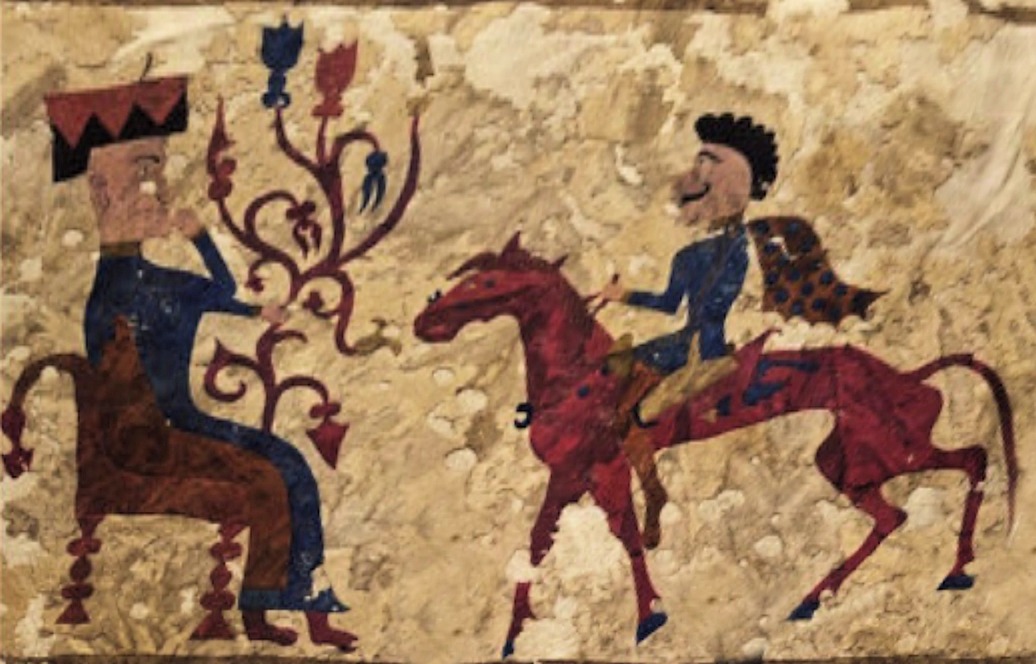
Decorated tapestry with seated goddess Tabiti and rider, Pazyryk Kurgan 5, Altai, Southern Russia c. 241 BCE.

The Pazyryk (Note: Russian: Пазырык) burials are a number of Scythian (Saka) Iron Age tombs found in the Pazyryk Valley and the Ukok plateau in the Altai Mountains, Siberia, south of the modern city of Novosibirsk, Russia; the site is close to the borders with China, Kazakhstan and Mongolia.

Numerous comparable burials have been found in neighbouring western Mongolia.

The tombs are Scythian-type kurgans, barrow-like tomb mounds containing wooden chambers covered over by large cairns of boulders and stones, dated to the 4th–3rd centuries BCE. The spectacular burials at Pazyryk are responsible for the introduction of the term kurgan, a Russian word, into general usage to describe these tombs. The region of the Pazyryk kurgans is considered the type site of the wider Pazyryk culture. The site is included in the Golden Mountains of Altai UNESCO World Heritage Site.

The bearers of the Pazyryk culture were horse-riding pastoral nomads of the steppe, and some may have accumulated great wealth through horse trading with merchants in Persia, India and China. This wealth is evident in the wide array of finds from the Pazyryk tombs, which include many rare examples of organic objects such as felt hangings, Chinese silk, the earliest known pile carpet, as well as horses fitted with elaborate trappings, wooden furniture, and other household goods. These finds were preserved when water seeped into the tombs in antiquity and froze, encasing the burial goods in ice, which remained frozen in the permafrost until the time of their excavation.

Because of a climatic freeze, some of the Altai-Sayan burials, notably those of the 5th century BCE at Pazyryk and neighbouring sites, such as Katanda, Shibe, and Tuekta, were isolated from external climatic variations by a protective layer of ice that conserved the organic substances buried in them. Certain geometric designs and sun symbols, such as the circle and rosette, recur at Pazyryk but are completely outnumbered by animal motifs. Such specifically Scythian features as zoomorphic junctures, i.e. the addition of a part of one animal to the body of another, are rarer in the Altaic region than in southern Russia. The stag and its relatives, however, figure as prominently in Altai-Sayan as in Scythian art.

"At Pazyryk too are found bearded mascarons (masks) of well-defined Greco-Roman origin, which were doubtless inspired by the Hellenistic kingdoms of the Cimmerian Bosporus."

== Pazyryk culture ==
Rudenko initially assigned the neutral label Pazyryk culture for these nomads and dated them to the 5th century BCE; the dating has been revised for barrows 1–5 at Pazyryk, which are now considered to date to the 4th–3rd centuries BCE. The Pazyryk culture has since been connected to the Scythians whose similar tombs have been found across the steppes. The Siberian animal style tattooing is characteristic of the Scythians. The artifacts show that these ancient Altai nomads had cultural and trading links to Central Asia, China and the Near East. There is evidence that Pazyryk trade routes were vast and connected with large areas of Asia including India, perhaps Pazyryk merchants largely trading in high quality horses.

== Discoveries ==
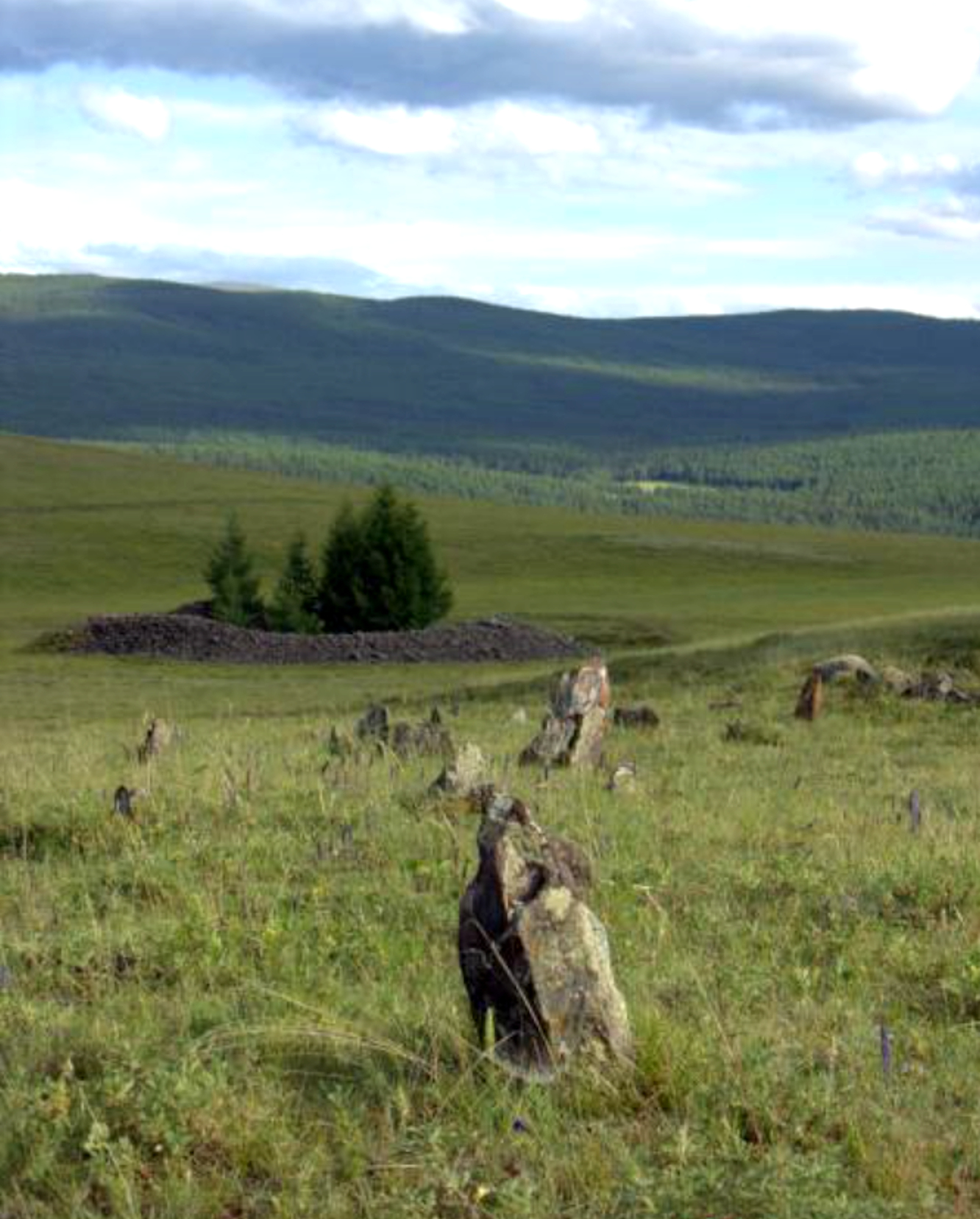
Pazyryk barrows

The first tomb at Pazyryk, barrow 1, was excavated by the archaeologist M. P. Griaznov in 1929; barrows 2–5 were excavated by Sergei Ivanovich Rudenko in 1947–1949. While many of the tombs had already been looted in earlier times, the excavators unearthed buried horses, and with them immaculately preserved cloth saddles, felt and woven rugs including the world's oldest pile carpet, a 3-metre-high four-wheel funeral chariot from the 5th century BCE and other splendid objects that had escaped the ravages of time. These finds are now exhibited at the Hermitage Museum in Saint Petersburg.

Cranial measurements from the Pazyryk burials performed in the 1960s suggested that the interred were largely of European ancestry with some admixture of Northeast Asian ancestry. But genetically, the Pazyryk population was actually fairly balanced between western and eastern Eurasian ancestry: it was modeled to derive between c. 50% from the Khövsgöl LBA source, c. 36% from Western Steppe Herders (Steppe_MLBA), and c. 14% from a BMAC-like source. One outlier specimen (Pazyryk_Berel_50BCE) could be modeled as c. 18% Pazyryk_IA and c. 82% additional Northeast Asian admixture, suggesting that this individual represents a migrant who arrived from further East.

=== Pazyryk-1 ===
Tomb number 1 at Pazyryk has numerous artifacts, including horses wearing deer antlers masks, or harnesses with human figures. The tomb is dated to the 4th century BCE. Its main content was looted, but the area with horse sacrifices remained intact. It was excavated by Griaznov in the 1930s.

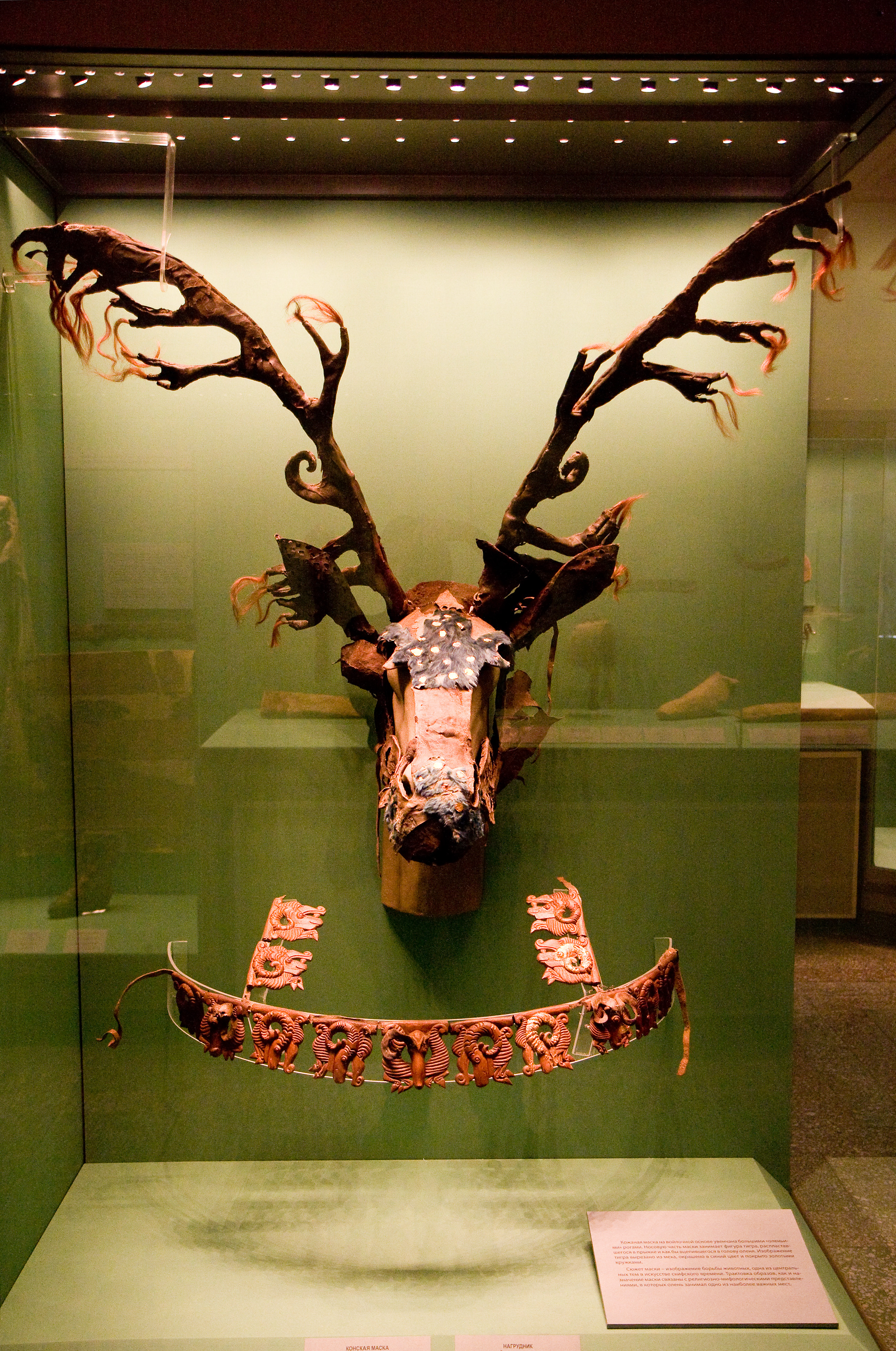
Deer mask for a Pazyryk horse (Tomb 1).

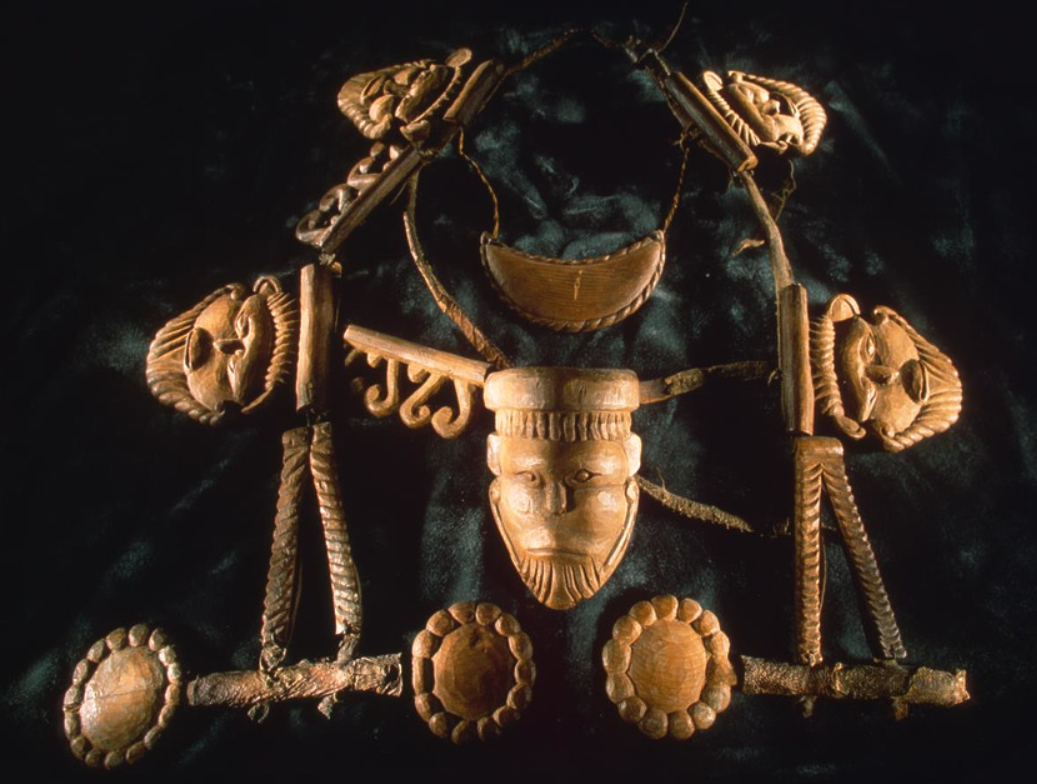
Horse harness with human figures, Pazyryk-1.

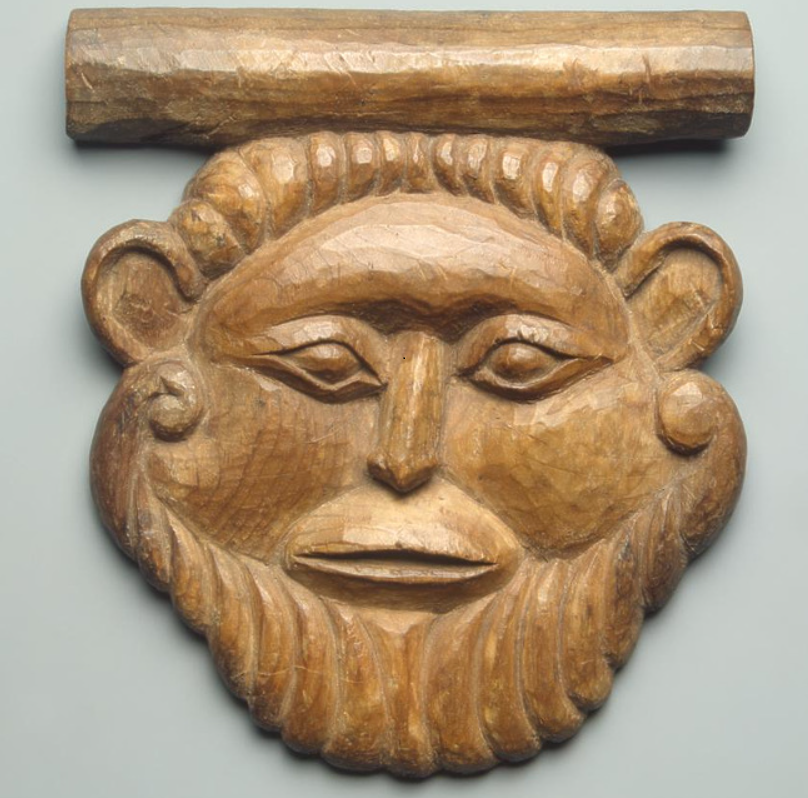
Human figure from a harness, Pazyryk-1

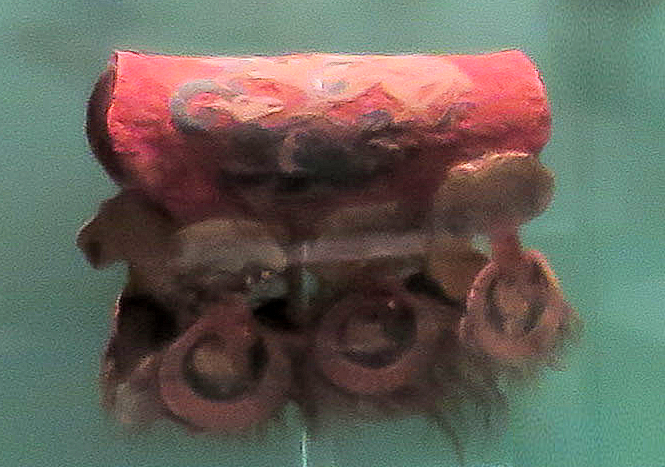
Decorated horse saddle, Pazyryk-1, 4th century BCE.

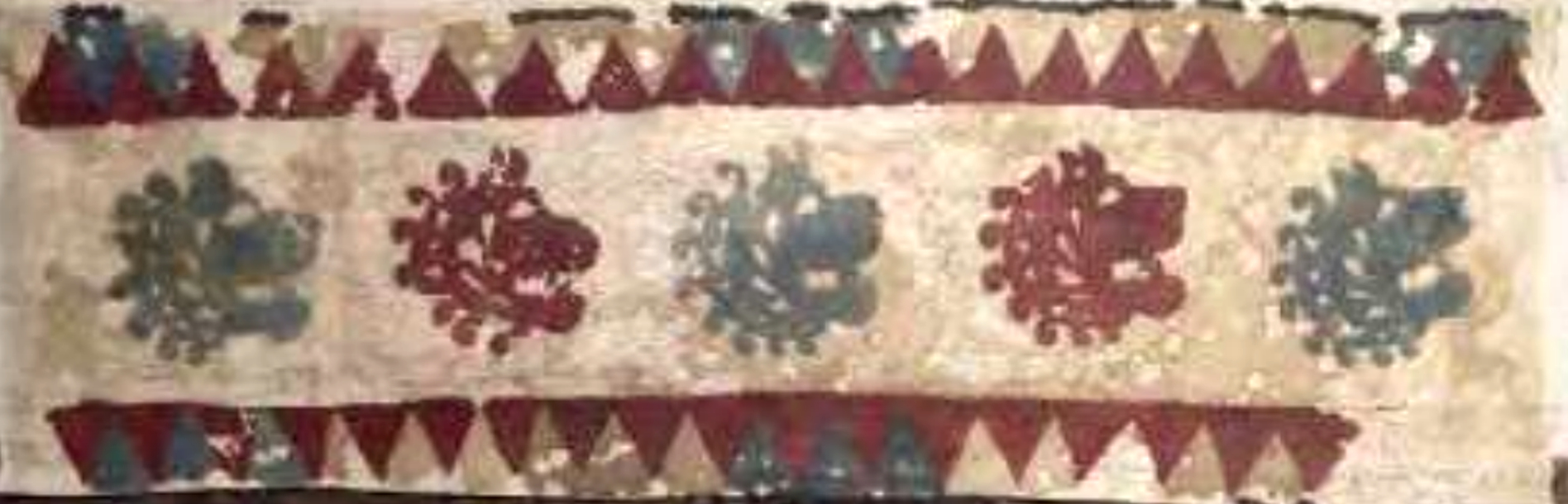
Felt band with Achaemenid-derived lion design. Pazyryk-1 tomb.

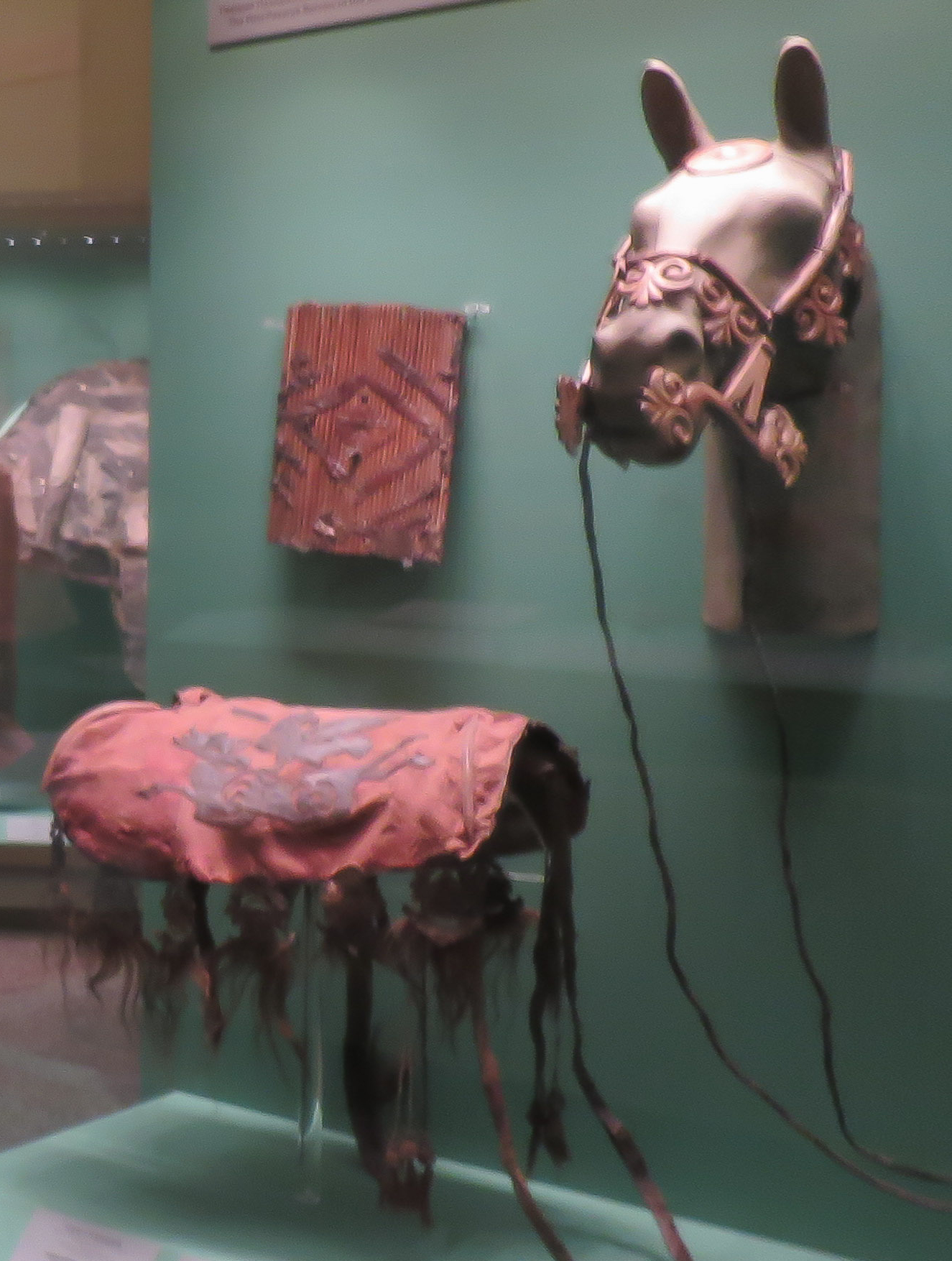
Pazyryk-1, horse harness, saddle and wood shield

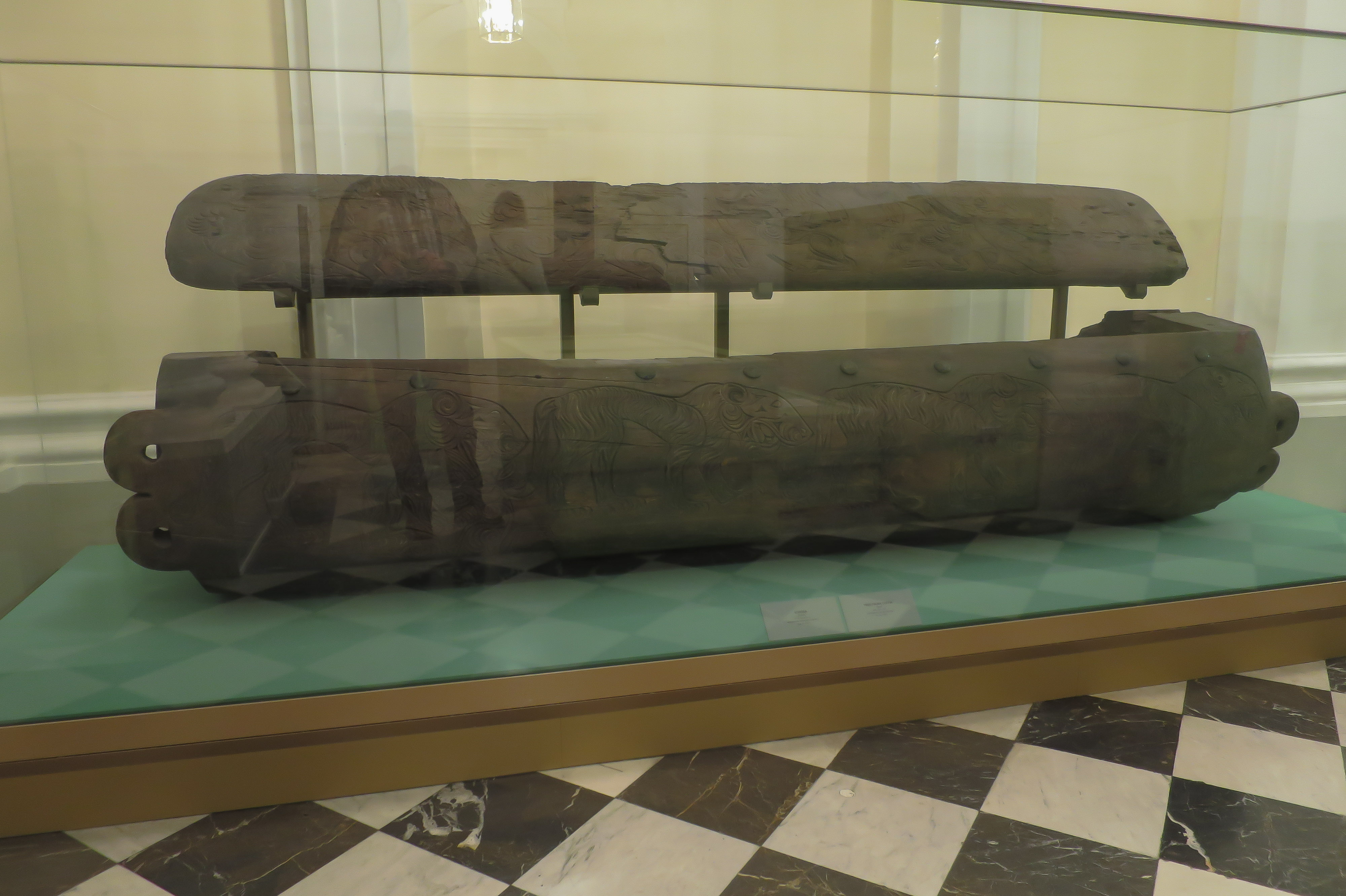
Sarcophagus from the burial chamber.

=== Pazyryk-2 chief ===
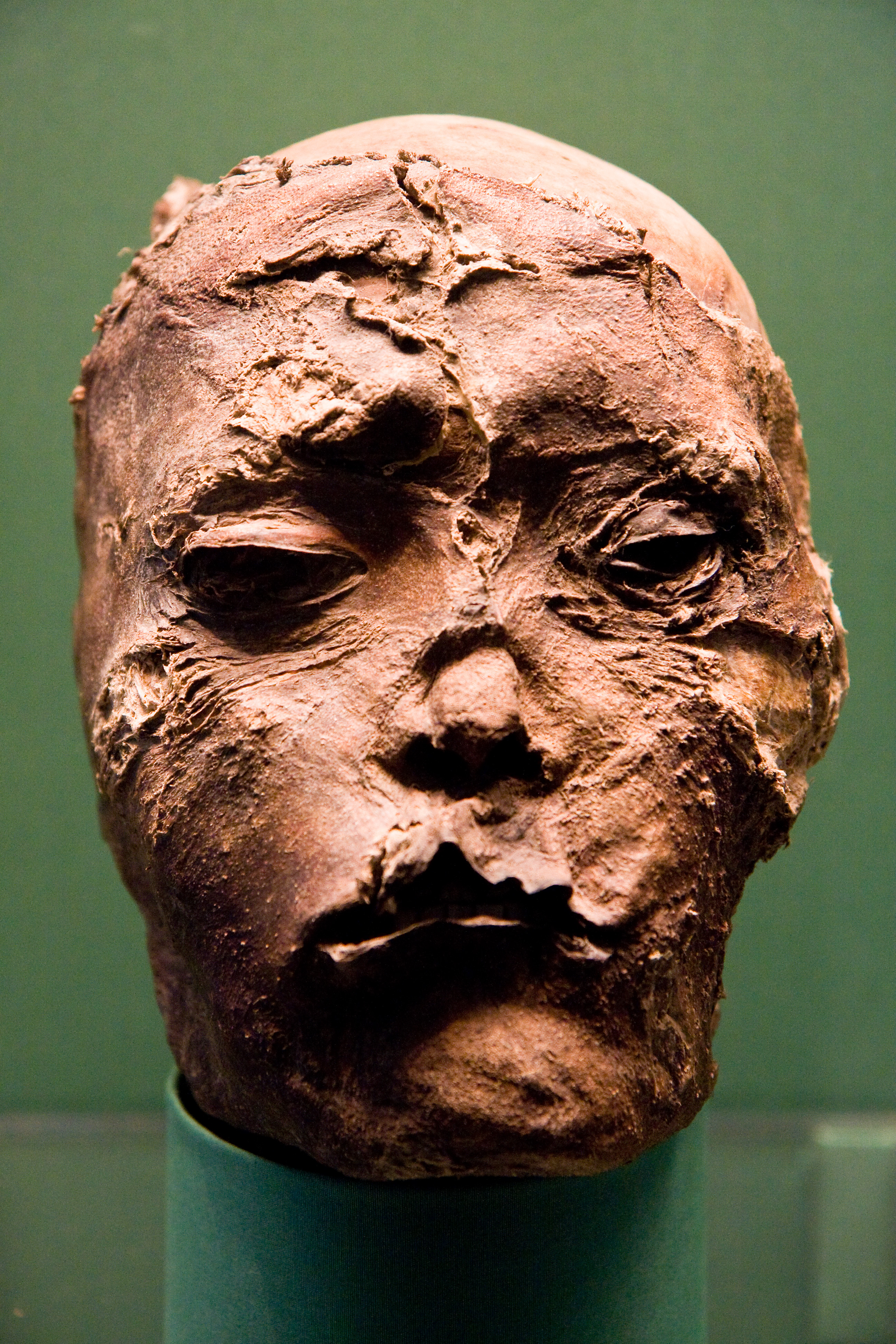
Embalmed head of Pazyryk clan chieftain. Burial mound 2, Pazyryk. Circa 300 BCE. State Hermitage Museum, St. Petersburg, 1684/29.

Rudenko's most striking discovery in 1947 was the body of a tattooed Pazyryk chief in burial mound 2: a thick-set, powerfully built man, 176 cm tall, who died when he was between 55 and 60. His tomb was monumental and lavishly equipped. He died violently, and was killed with a Scythian-type battle axe, and scalped. He was carefully embalmed, and his body was covered in animal style tattoos, but not his face. Parts of the body had deteriorated, but much of the tattooing was still clearly visible (see image). Subsequent investigation using reflected infrared photography revealed that all five bodies discovered in the Pazyryk kurgans were tattooed. No instruments specifically designed for tattooing were found, but the Pazyryks had extremely fine needles with which they did miniature embroidery, and these were probably used for tattooing.

The chief was elaborately decorated with an interlocking series of striking designs representing a variety of fantastic beasts. The best preserved tattoos were images of a donkey, a mountain ram, two highly stylized deer with long antlers and an imaginary carnivore on the right arm. Two monsters resembling griffins decorate the chest, and on the left arm are three partially obliterated images which seem to represent two deer and a mountain goat. On the front of the right leg a fish extends from the foot to the knee. A monster crawls over the right foot, and on the inside of the shin is a series of four running rams which touch each other to form a single design. The left leg also bears tattoos, but these designs could not be clearly distinguished. In addition, the chief's back is tattooed with a series of small circles in line with the vertebral column.

His embalmed head, now in the Hermitage Museum, St. Petersburg, suggests a rather "Mongoloïd type". He was crowned with a gilded copper tiara decorated with six winged, horned and hoofed lions ("lion griffins"). The lion griffins were made of wood, but were originally covered in gold foil before the foils were looted by tomb robbers. A false beard, made of hair, sinew thread and leather, was also discovered next to him in his tomb. Its significance remains conjectural, as all mummies recovered from Pazyryk were clean-shaven. An extraordinary male headgear, a carved wooden crest representing a bird of prey with a deer head in its beak, was also found at the head of the coffin, and is thought to be the headgear of the chieftain.

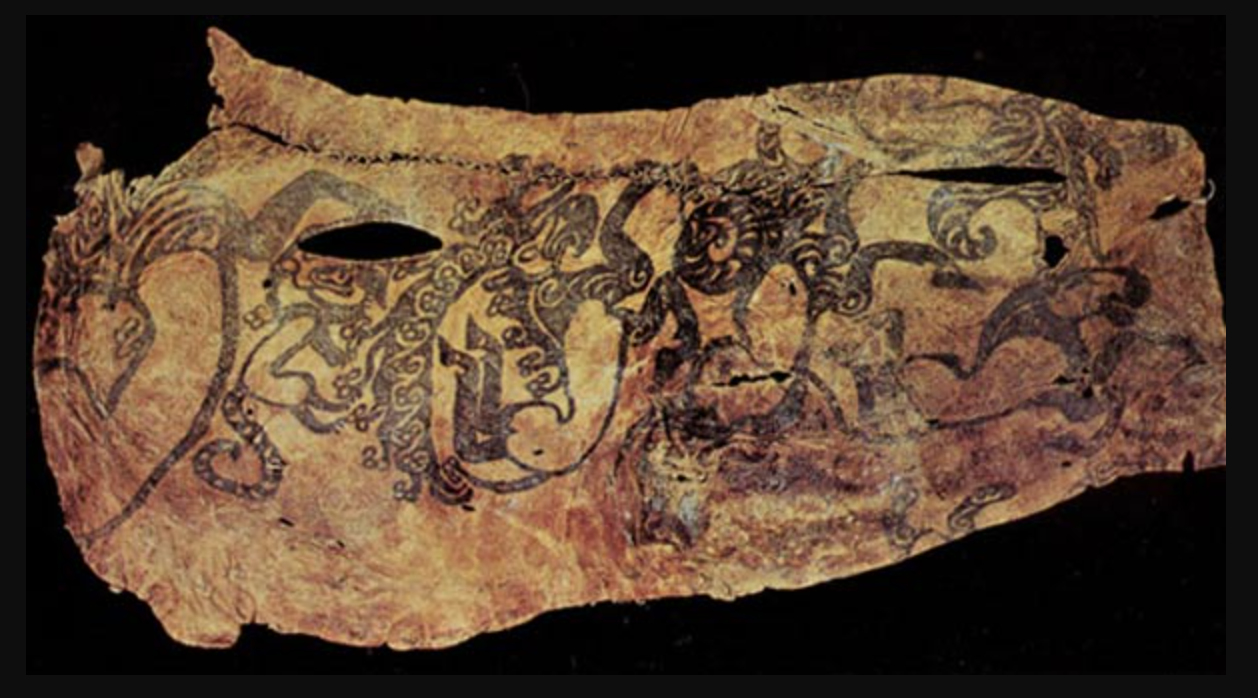
Tattoos of the chief's right arm, with zoomorphic symbols.

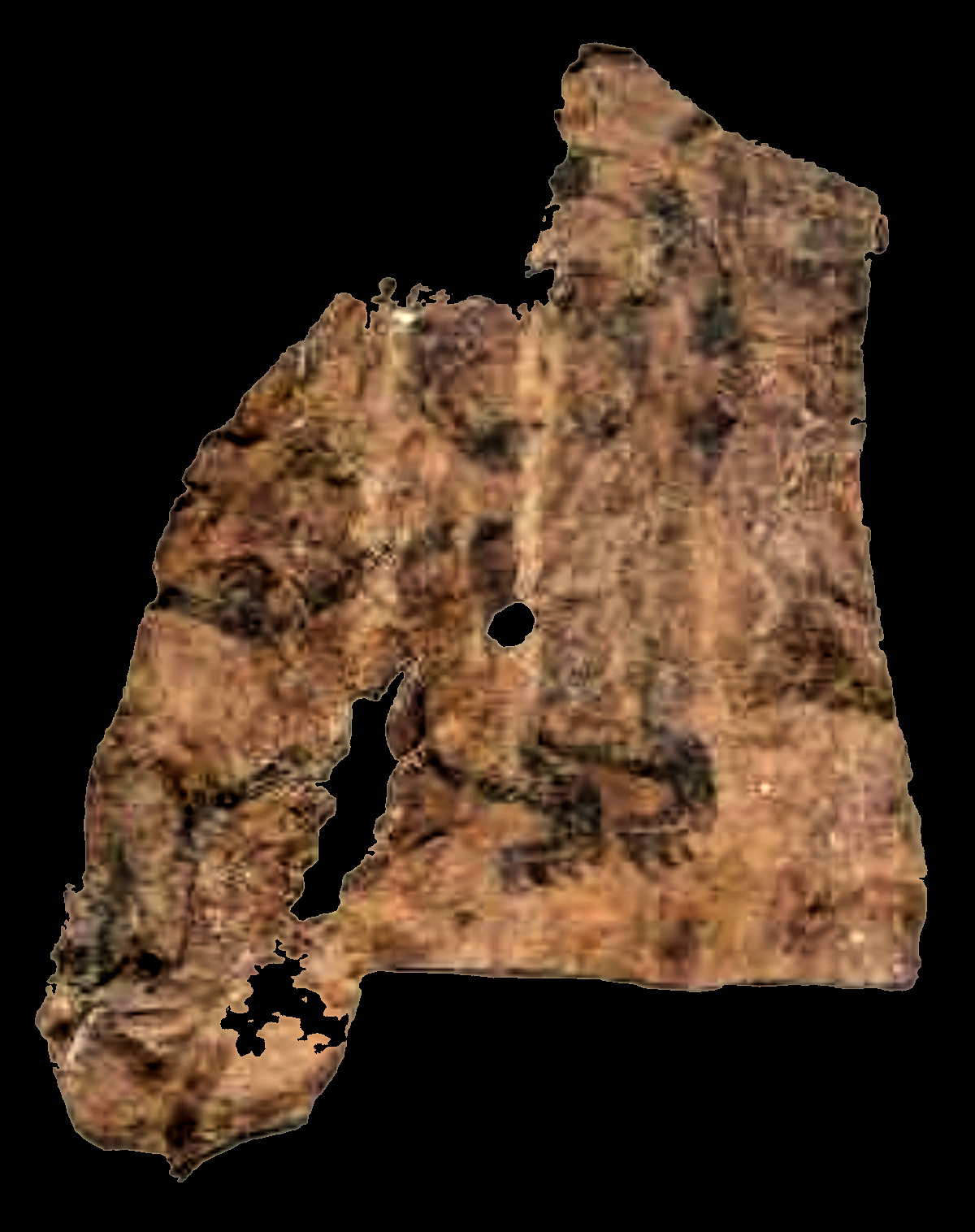
Tattoos of the chief's back and left arm.

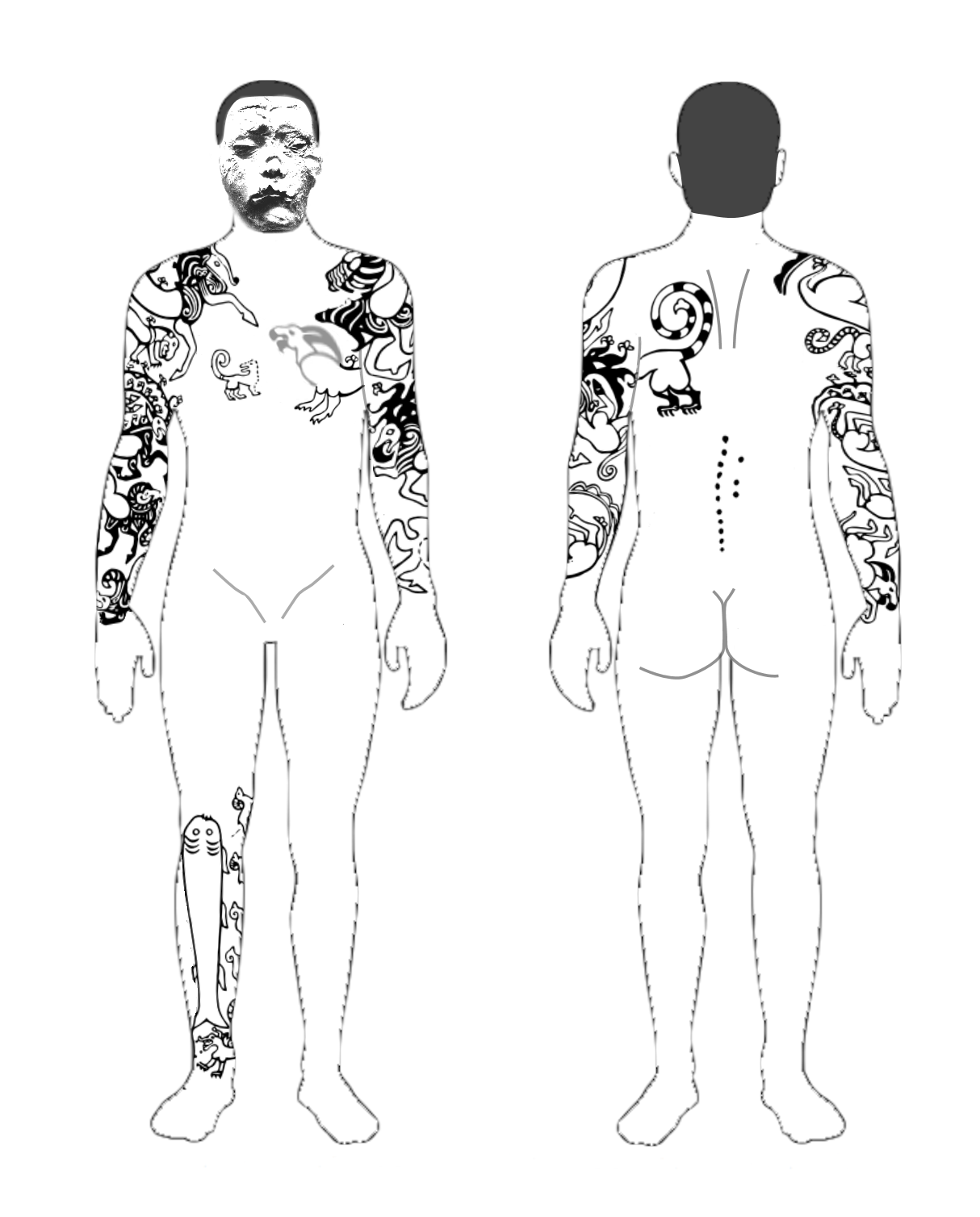
Tattoos of the Pazyryk-2 chief.

=== Pazyryk-5 ===
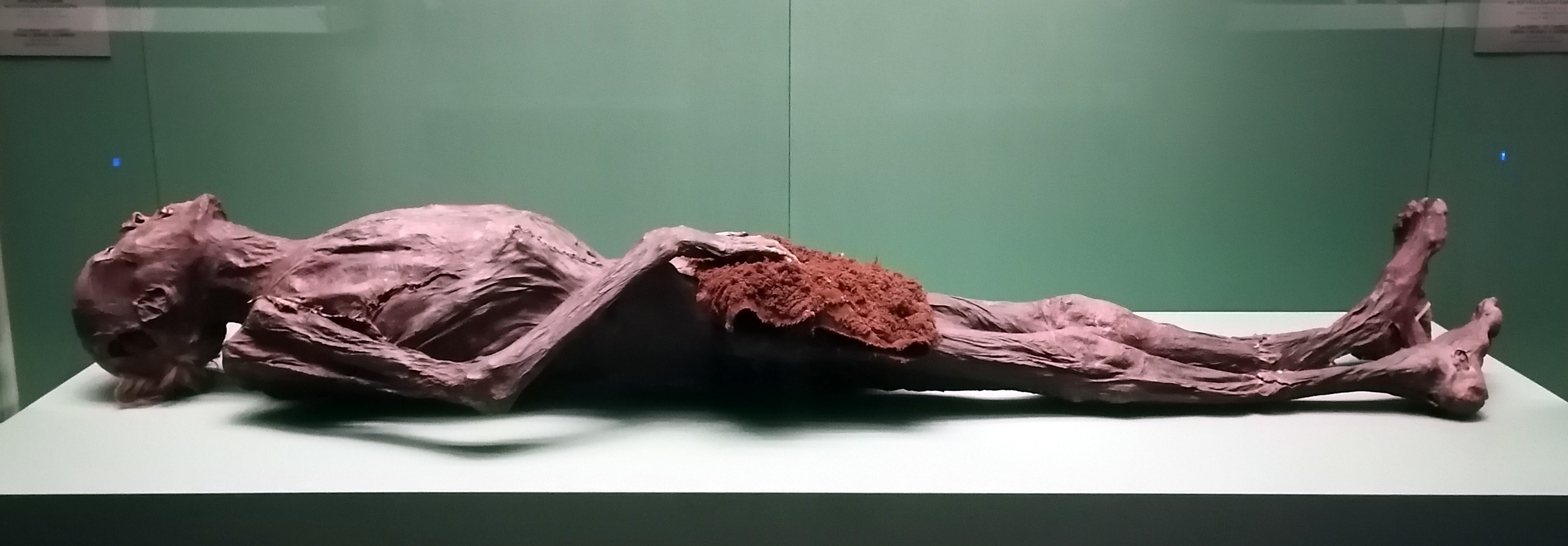
Pazyryk-5 mummy

Pazyryk barrow 5 also contained the remains of a Saka chief. It was excavated by S.I. Rudenko in 1949.

The grave was formed of an inner and an outer log sarcophagus, covered with five layers of logs and a layer of boulders. The tomb was looted in antiquity, but still contained the embalmed remains of a man and a woman, together with some artifacts, nine horses, either harnessed to chariot or back riding, a disassembled wagon with four large wheels on spokes, and various carpets.

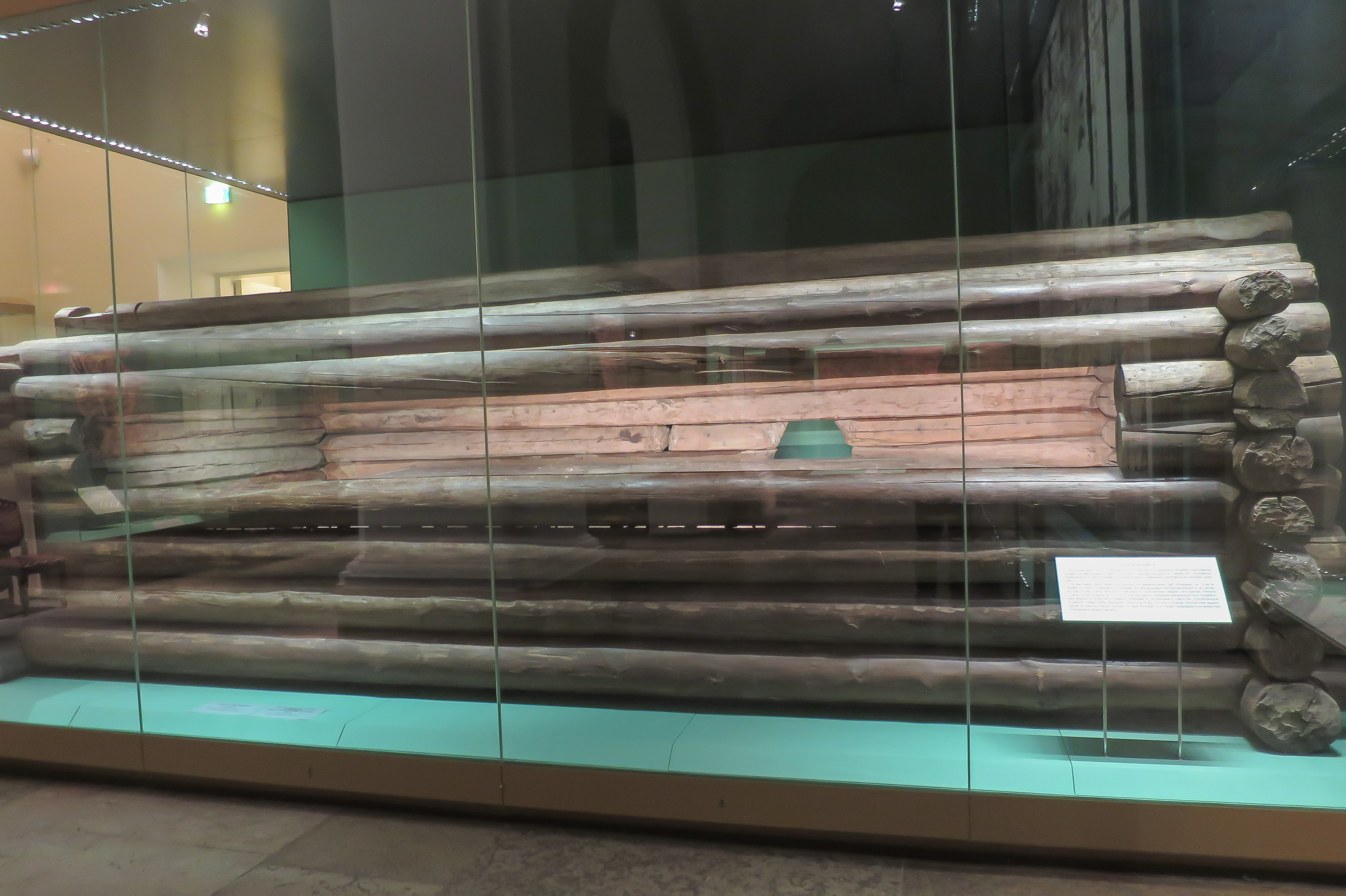
Inner log sarcophagus, Pazyryk-5.

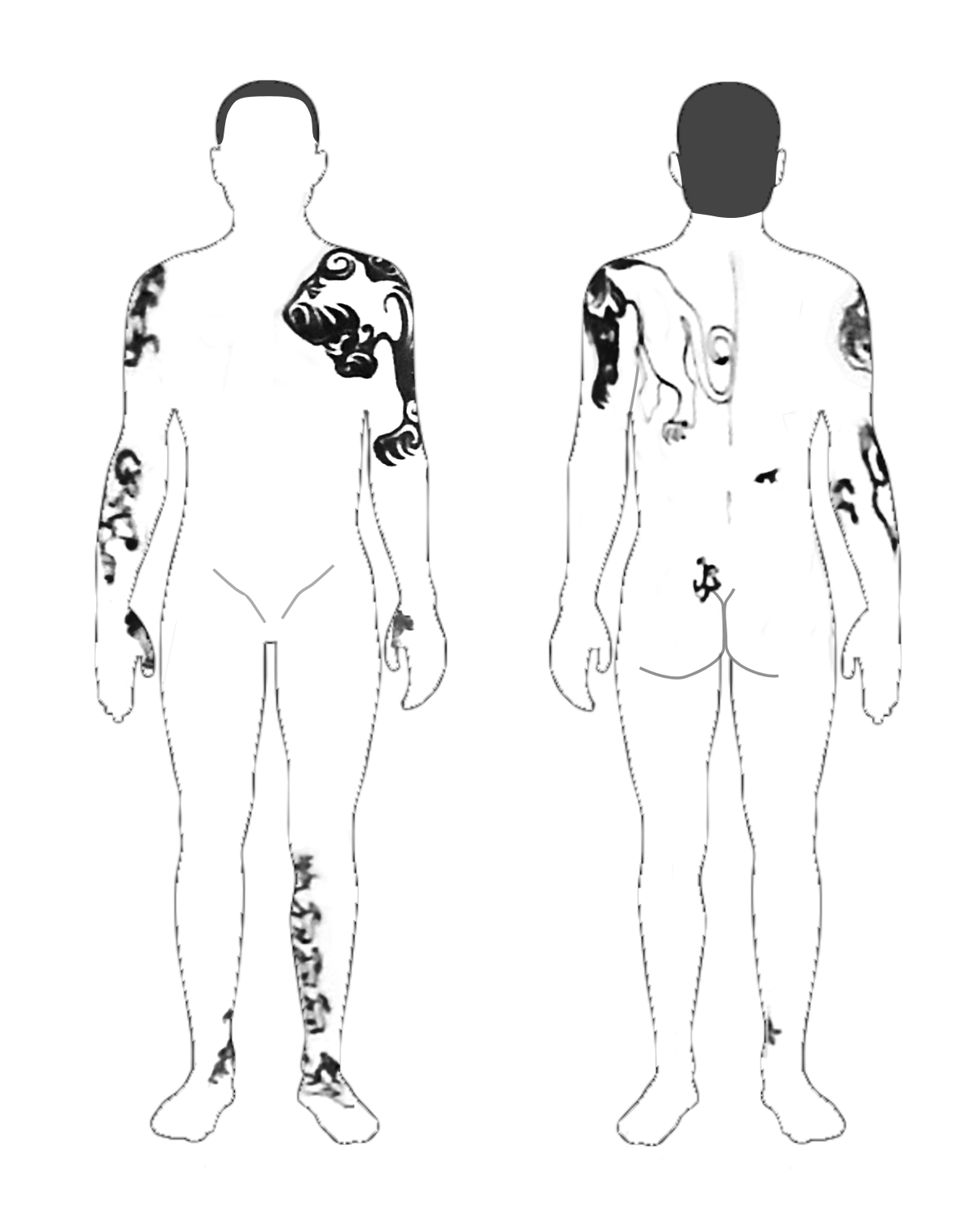
Tattoos of the man in Pazyryk-5. He has a large lion design over the left shoulder.

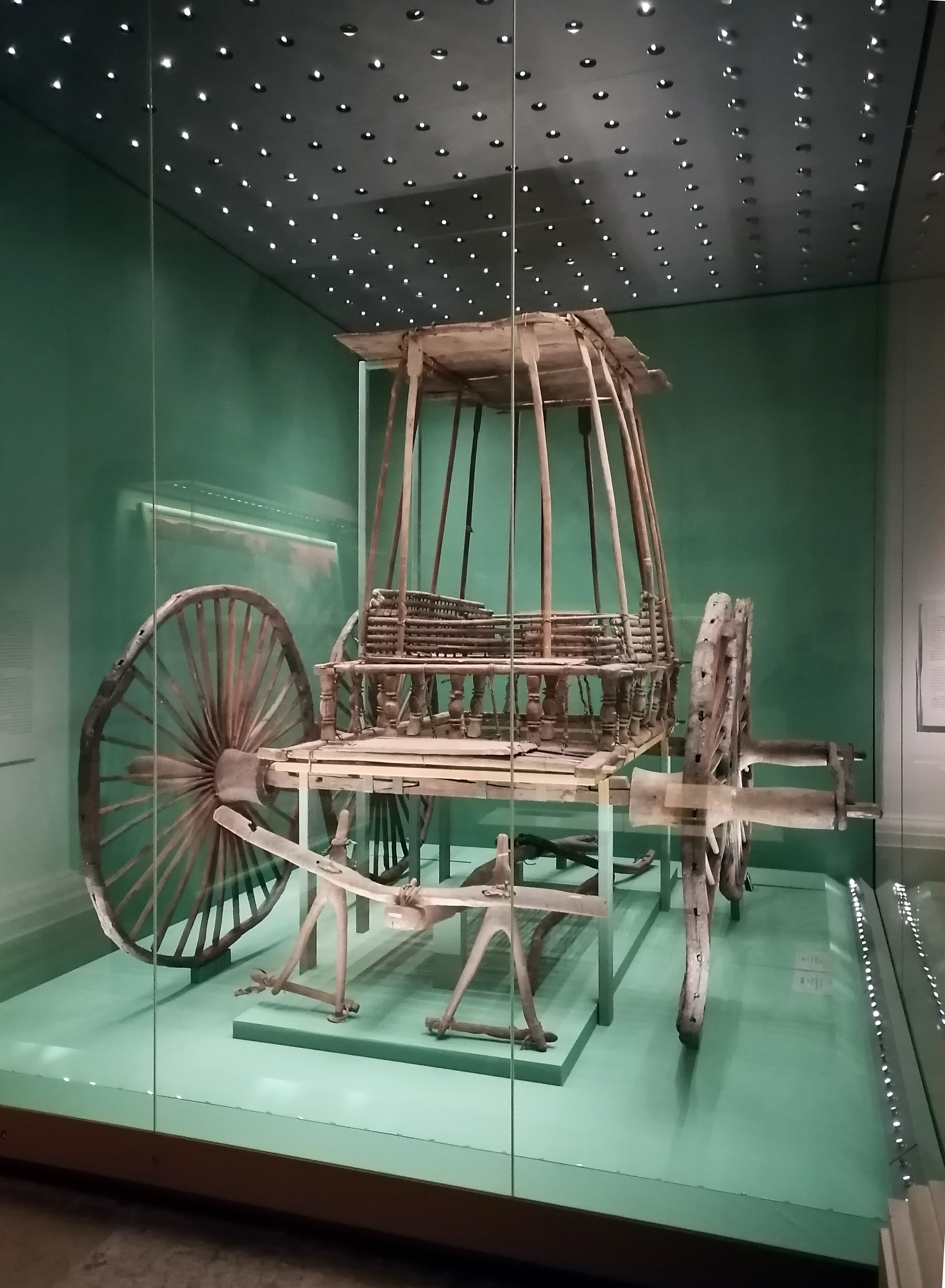
The wagon, Pazyryk-5

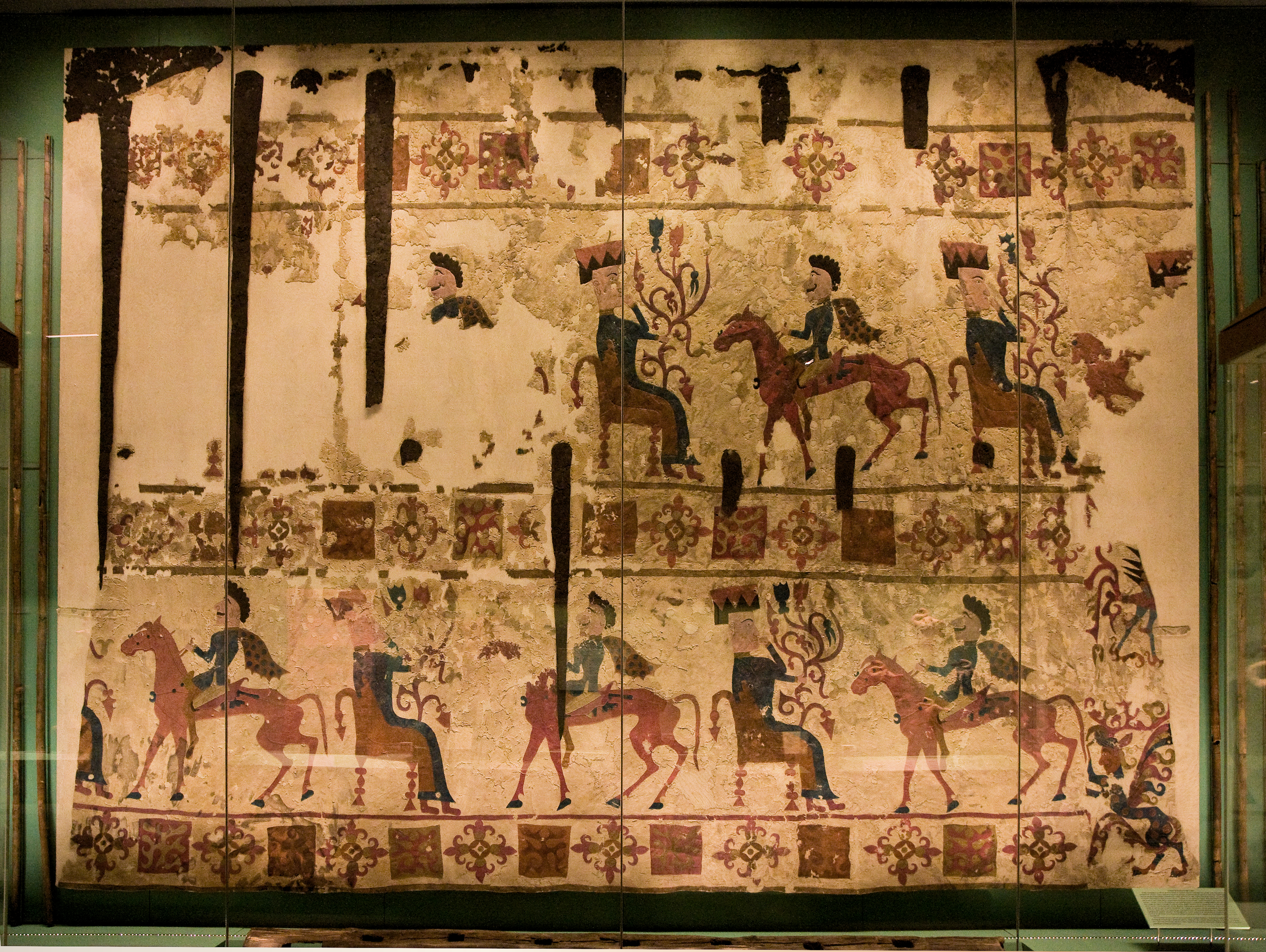
Carpet, Pazyryk-5

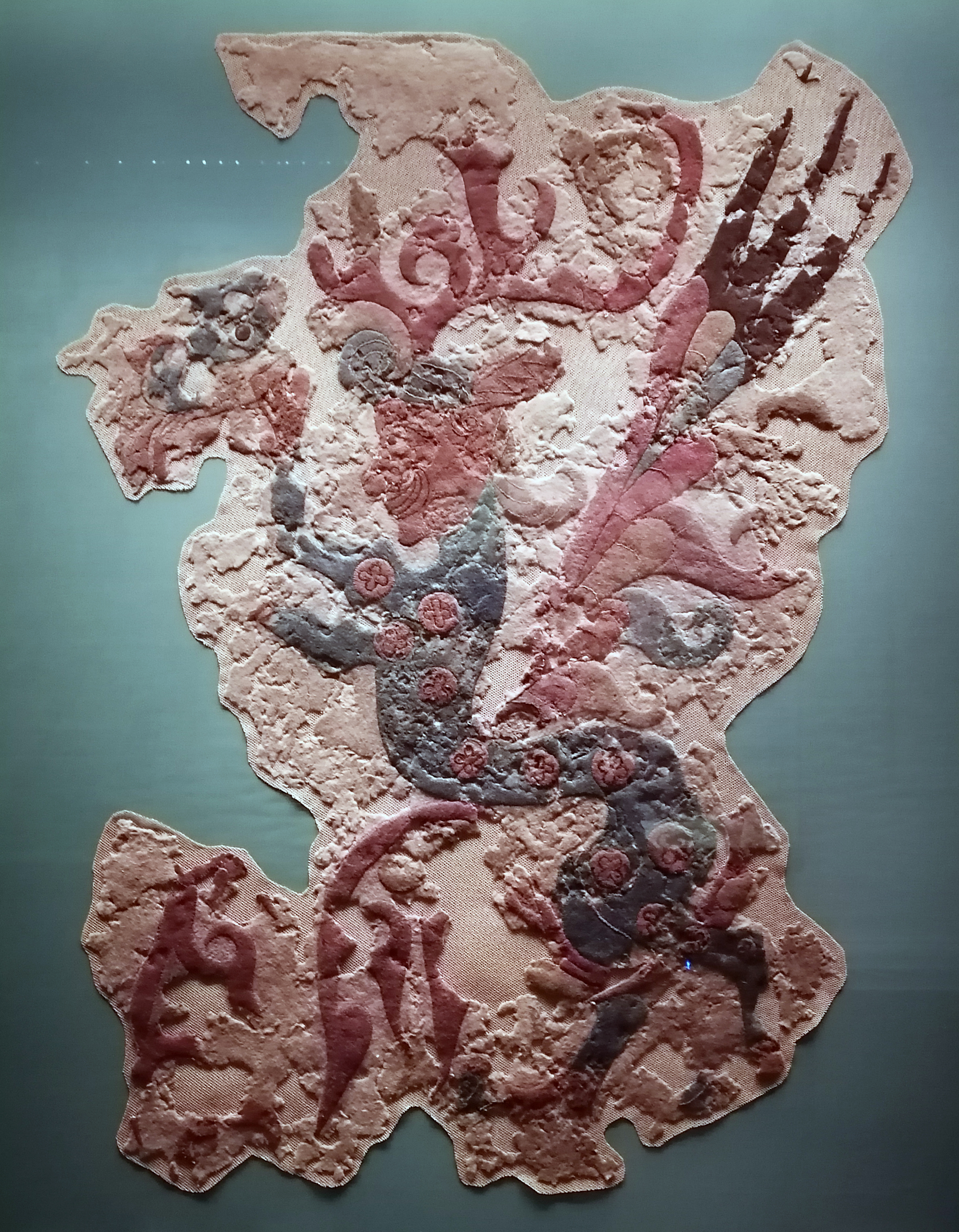
Decorated felt piece, Pazyryk-5

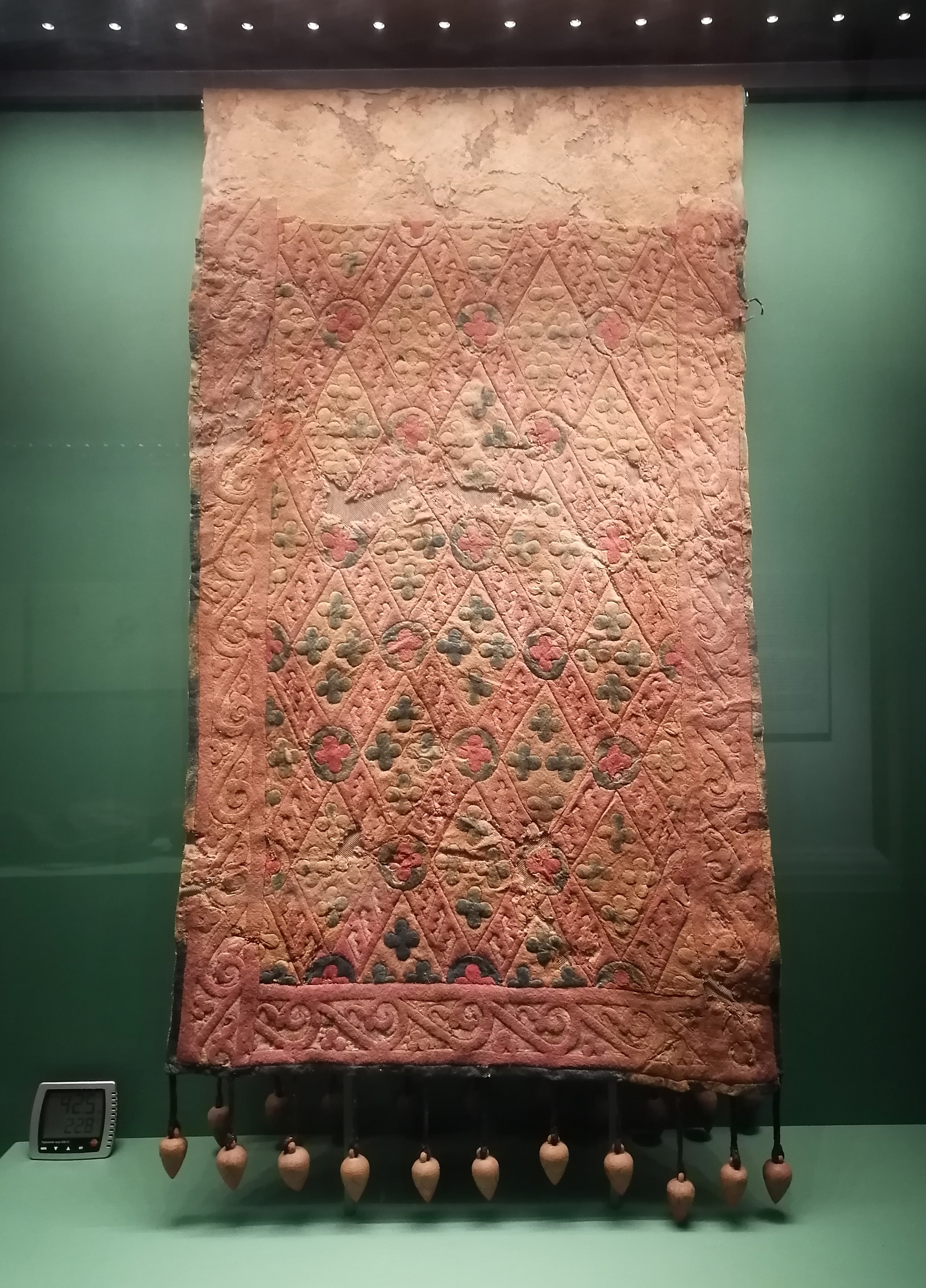
Carpet from Pazyryk-5

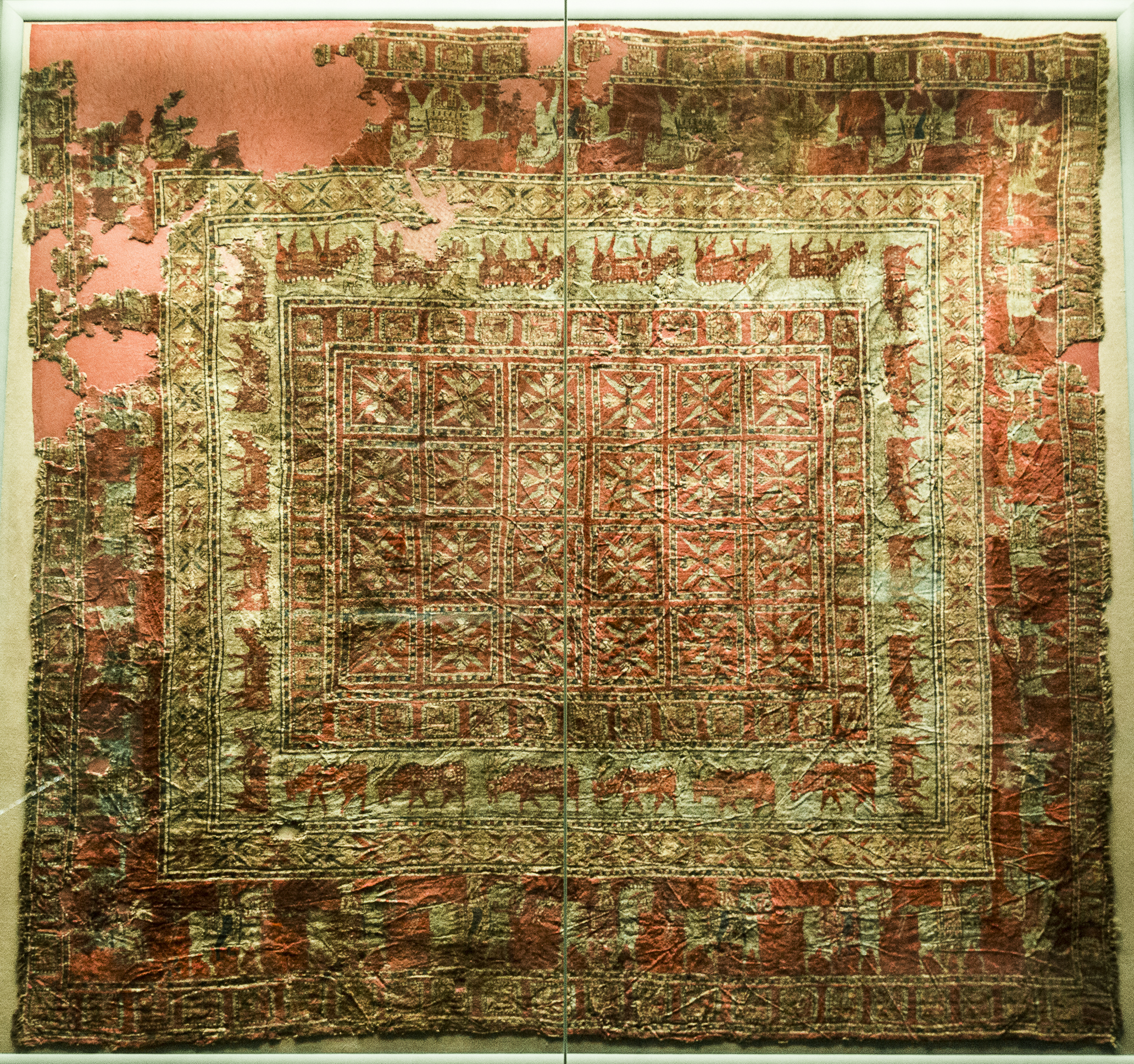
Decorated carpet from Pazyryk-5, of Near-Eastern origin. This is the earliest surviving knotted-pile carpet.

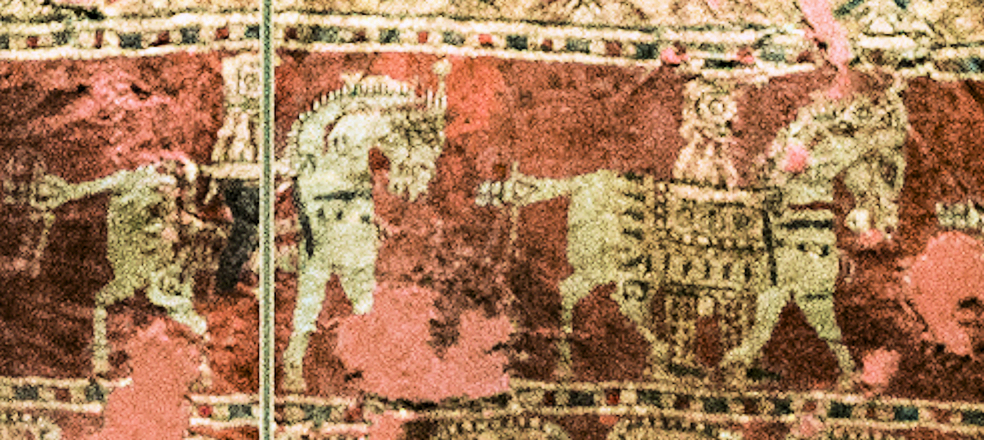
Pazyryk-5 carpet, Near-Eastern horsemen detail

=== Ice Maiden ===
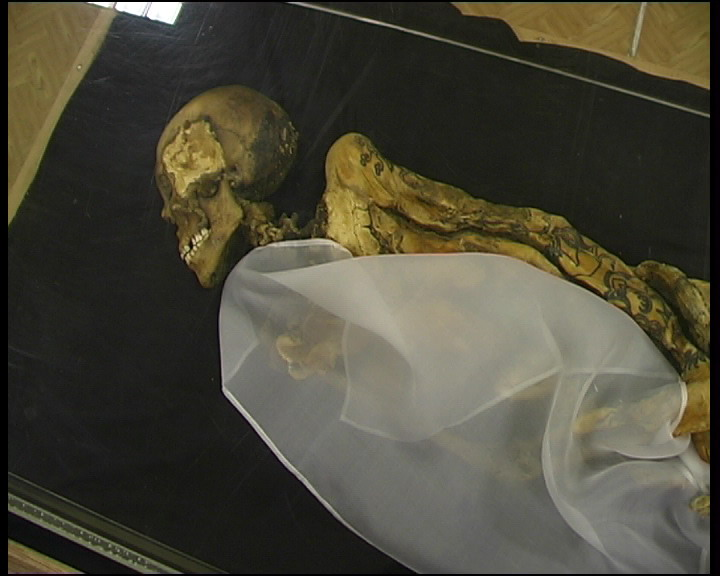
The Ice Maiden – fifth century BCE

The most famous undisturbed Pazyryk burial so far recovered is the Ice Maiden or "Altai Lady" found by archaeologist Natalia Polosmak in 1993 at Ukok, near the Chinese border. The find was a rare example of a single woman given a full ceremonial burial in a wooden chamber tomb in the fifth century BCE, accompanied by six horses. She was buried over 2,400 years ago in a casket fashioned from the hollowed-out trunk of a Siberian larch tree. On the outside of the casket were stylized images of deer and snow leopards carved in leather. Shortly after burial, the grave had apparently been flooded by freezing rain, and the entire contents of the burial chamber had remained frozen in permafrost. Six horses wearing elaborate harnesses had been sacrificed and lay to the north of the chamber.

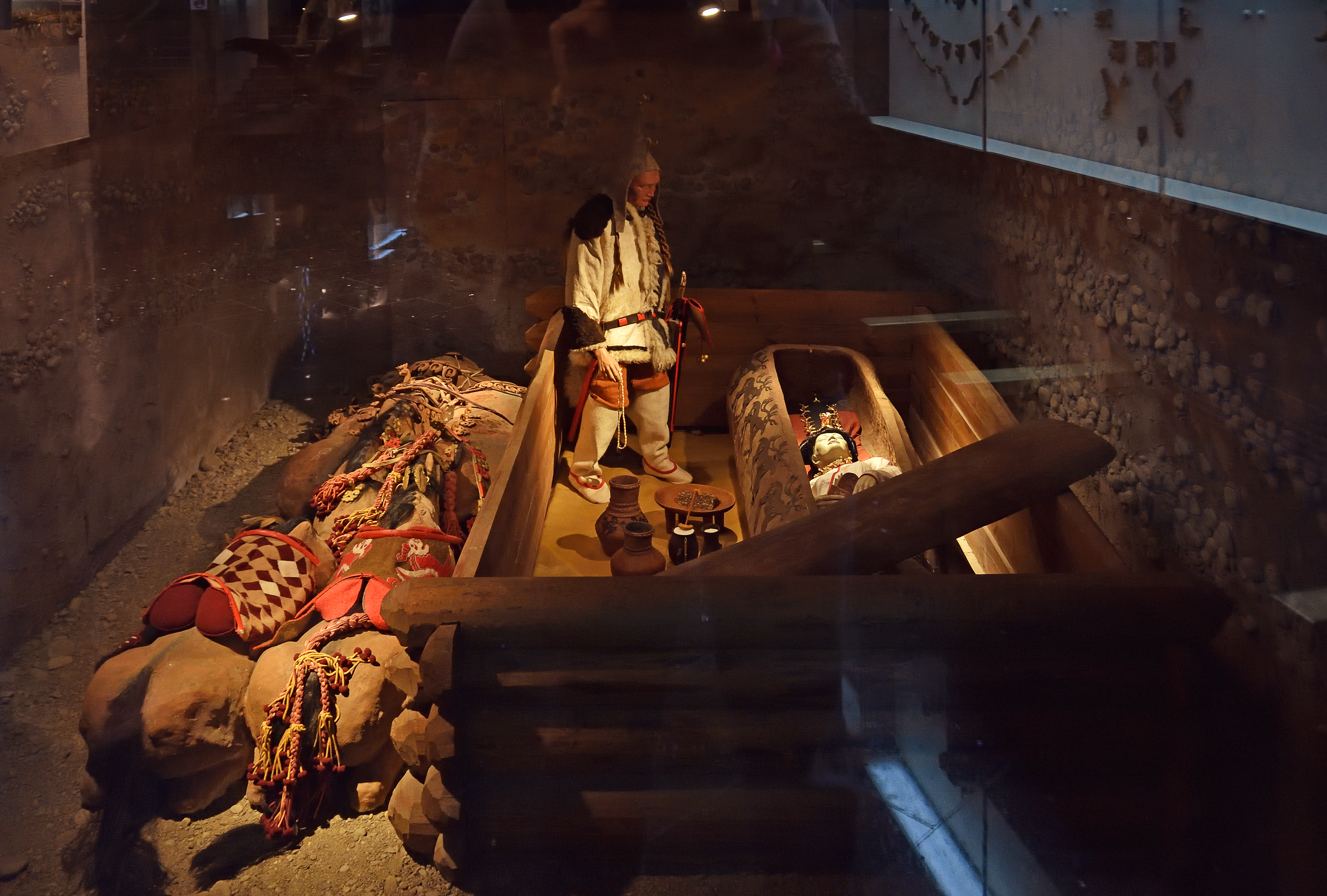
Reconstruction of the tomb chamber of the Siberian Ice Maiden, in the Anokhin Museum. Sacrificial horses are visible to the left, while the princess lies in a wooden sarcophagus.

The maiden's well-preserved body, carefully embalmed with peat and bark, was arranged to lie on her side as if asleep. She was young, and her hair had been shaved off but she was wearing a wig and tall hat; she was 167 centimetres (5 ft 6 in) tall. Even the animal style tattoos were preserved on her pale skin: creatures with horns that develop into flowered forms. Her coffin was made large enough to accommodate the high felt headdress she was wearing, which was decorated with swans and gold-covered carved cats. She was clad in a long crimson and white striped woolen skirt and white felt stockings. Her yellow blouse was originally thought to be made of wild "tussah" silk but closer examination of the fibers indicate the material is not Chinese but was a wild silk which came from somewhere else, perhaps India. Near her coffin was a vessel made of yak horn, and dishes containing gifts of coriander seeds: all of which suggest that the Pazyryk trade routes stretched across vast areas of Iran. Similar dishes in other tombs were thought to have held Cannabis sativa, confirming a practice described by Herodotus, but tests showed the mixture to be coriander seeds, probably used to disguise the smell of the body.

Two years after the discovery of the "Ice Maiden" Dr. Polosmak's husband, Vyacheslav Molodin, found a frozen man, elaborately tattooed with an elk, with two long braids that reached to his waist, buried with his weapons.

Dr Anicua also noted that her blouse was a bit stained, indicating that the material was not a new garment, made for the burial.

=== Pazyryk rug ===
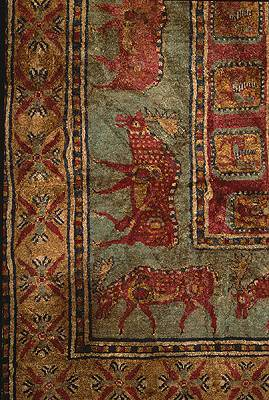
The Pazyryk rug

One of the most famous finds at Pazyryk is the Pazyryk rug, which is probably the oldest surviving pile carpet in the world. According to some sources, it was manufactured in Ancient Armenia, using the Armenian double knot and Armenian cochineal for the red color. Ulrich Schurmann, a German art historian specializing in oriental carpets, says of it, "From all the evidence available I am convinced that the Pazyryk rug was a funeral accessory and most likely a masterpiece of Armenian workmanship." Fellow German historian Volkmar Gantzhorn concurs with this thesis. According to another source, it is an imported Persian work because of its decoration, but also the horse type, which seems Nisean. However, other sources state the horse design is the same as the relief depicting part of the Armenian delegation at the ruins of Persepolis in Iran, where various nations are depicted as bearing tribute. It measures 183 cm × 200 cm (6 ft 0 in × 6 ft 7 in) and has a knot density of approximately 360,000 knots per square meter, which is higher than most modern carpets. The middle of the rug consists of a ribbon motif, while in the border there is a procession with elk or deer, and in another border warriors on horses. When it was found it had been deeply frozen in a block of ice, which is why it is so well-preserved. The rug can be seen at the Hermitage Museum in Saint Petersburg, Russia.

=== Other findings ===
In a corner of one grave chamber of the Pazyryk cemetery was a fur bag containing coriander seed, a censer filled with stones, and the hexapod frame of an inhalation tent; these are believed to have been utilized at the end of the funerary ritual for purification.

Other undisturbed kurgans have been found to contain remarkably well-preserved remains, comparable to the earlier Tarim mummies of Xinjiang. Bodies were preserved using mummification techniques and were also naturally frozen in solid ice from water seeping into the tombs. They were encased in coffins made from hollowed trunks of larch (which may have had sacral significance) and sometimes accompanied by sacrificed concubines and horses. The clustering of tombs in a single area implies that it had particular ritual significance for these people, who were likely to have been willing to transport their deceased leaders great distances for burial.

As recently as the summer of 2012, tombs have been discovered at various locations. In January 2007, a timber tomb of a blond chieftain warrior was unearthed in the permafrost of the Altai mountains region close to the Mongolian border. The body of the presumed Pazyryk chieftain is tattooed; his sable coat is well preserved, as are some other objects, including what looks like scissors. A local archaeologist, Aleksei Tishkin, complained that the indigenous population of the region strongly disapproves of archaeological digs, prompting the scientists to move their activities across the border to Mongolia.

== See also ==
- Noin-Ula burial site
- Horse burial
- Pazyryk Valley
