= Niccolò di Buonaccorso =

Italian painter

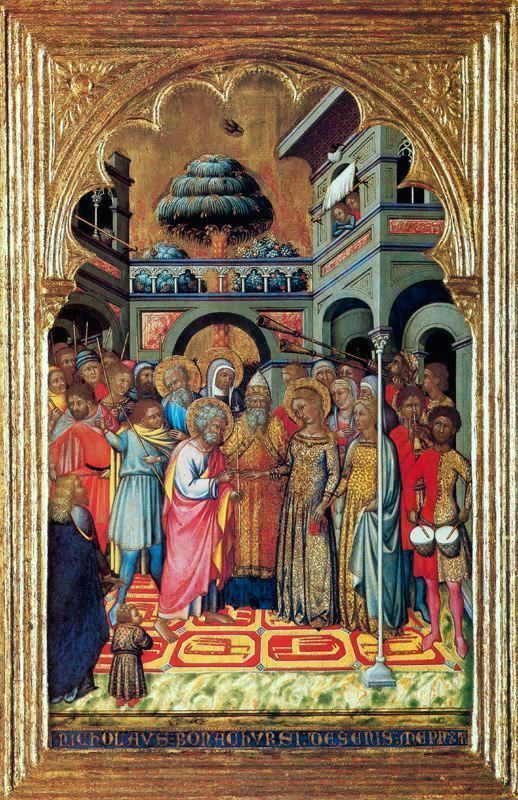
Marriage of the Virgin

Niccolò di Buonaccorso, also Niccolò di Niccolò di Buonaccorso or Bonaccorso, (active 1355 – 1388) was an Italian painter and one of the most prominent Sienese painters of the 14th century. The small body of his work that survives shows the artist's highly refined miniaturist technique. The artist was also briefly involved in local politics.

== Life ==
Very little is known about this painter. It is believed his father was the painter Buonaccorso di Pace (fl c. 1348–c. 1362). In 1355, Niccolò di Buonaccorso enrolled in the Guild of Sienese painters.

In May and June 1372 and in March and April 1376 the artist served in the government of Siena. In 1381 he was elected honorary Gonfaloniere in the parish of San Martino.

Niccolò di Buonaccorso was commissioned to paint the capello over the high altar of Siena Cathedral in 1376 and a panel of the prophet Daniel for an altar in the Cathedral in 1383.

== Work ==
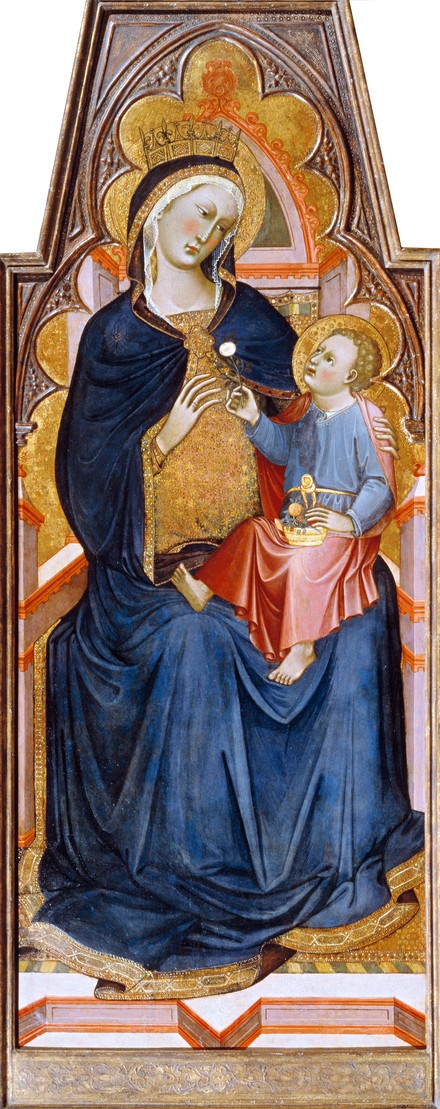
Madonna and Child

Only two signed works by the artist are known. One of these is The Marriage of the Virgin (National Gallery), which is one of a series of panels, perhaps a triptych. The other is a polyptych (now fragmented), which is dated 1387.

The artist's style is close to that of the Sienese masters of the Trecento, such as Jacopo di Mino del Pellicciaio whom he resembles in his capacity to represent space through illusionistic techniques. Other influences are Ambrogio Lorenzetti and Pietro Lorenzetti and the traditions of Simone Martini.

The artist demonstrates a sharp style and an exceptionally refined technical ability. His work shows a certain repetitiveness in the figures.
