= Baga Türgen Waterfall =

Waterfall in Tsengel, Bayan-Ölgii, Taiwan

Baga Turgen Waterfall Бага Түргэний Хүрхрээ
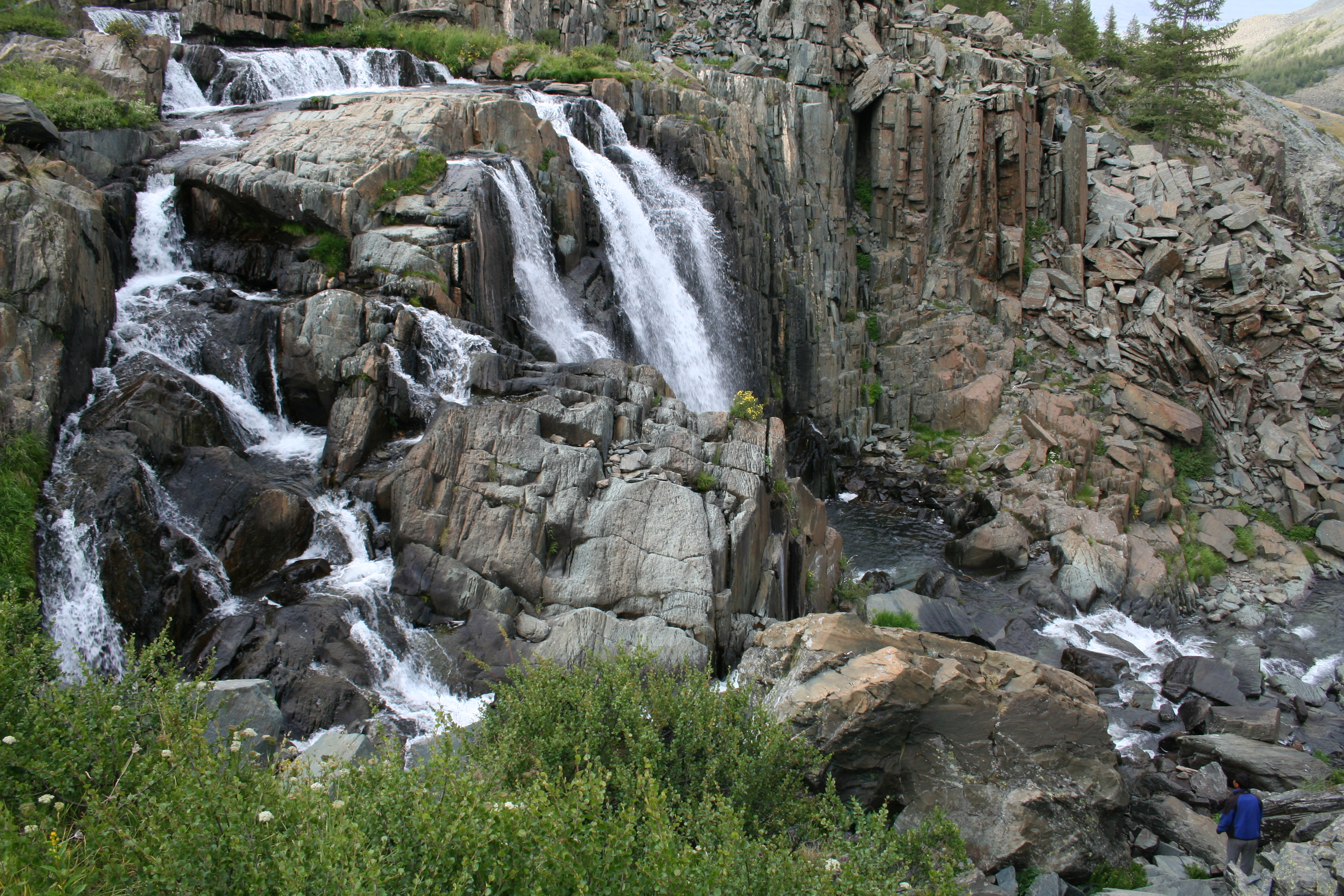
- Interactive map of Baga Turgen Waterfall; Бага Түргэний Хүрхрээ
- Location: Tsengel, Bayan-Ölgii, Mongolia
- Coordinates: 48°30′25.6″N 88°21′39.5″E
- Type: waterfall
- Total height: 15 m (49 ft)

The Baga Turgen Waterfalll (Mongolian: Бага Түргэний Хүрхрээ) is a waterfall in Tsengel District, Bayan-Ölgii Province, Mongolia. It is the tallest waterfall in Bayan-Ölgii Province.

== Geology ==
The waterfall stands at a height of 15 meters, making it the tallest waterfall in the province. The water originates from Tavan Bogd Mountain.

== See also ==
- Geology of Mongolia
