= Altai constituency =

Constituency of the State Duma of the Russian Federation

Altai single-member constituency
- Constituency of the Russian State Duma

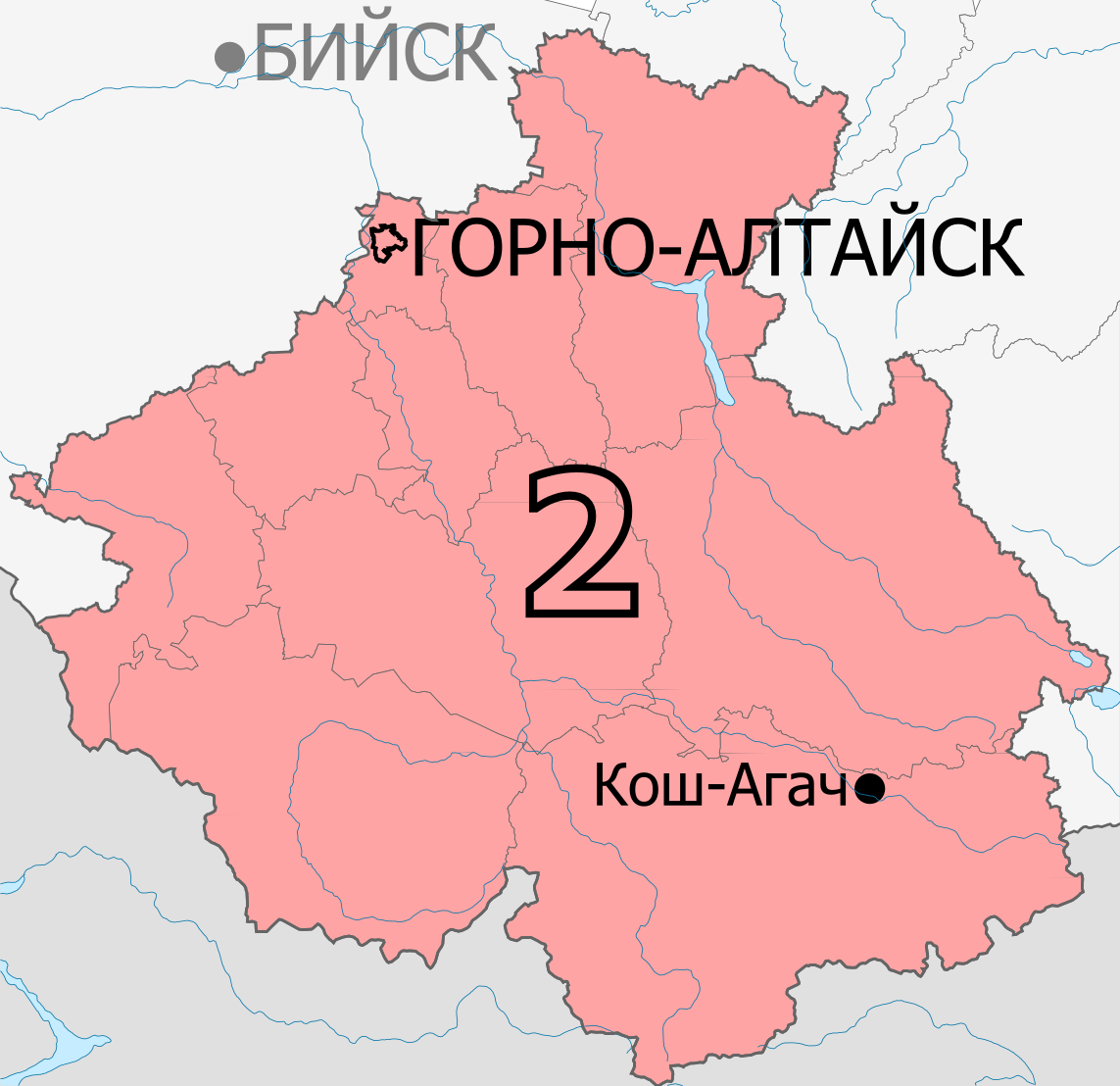
- Deputy: Alexander Surazov; United Russia
- Federal subject: Altai Republic
- Districts: Chemalsky, Choysky, Gorno-Altaysk, Kosh-Agachsky, Mayminsky, Ongudaysky, Shebalinsky, Turochaksky, Ulagansky, Ust-Kansky, Ust-Koksinsky
- Voters: 164,217 (2026)

The Altai constituency (No.2 (Note: Gorny Altai constituency No.9 in 1993–1995, Gorny Altai constituency No.2 in 1995–2007)) is a Russian legislative constituency in the Altai Republic. The constituency encompasses the entire territory of Gorny Altai.

The constituency has been represented since 2026 by United Russia deputy Alexander Surazov, former Altai Minister of Youth Policy and Sport and Russian Army captain, who won the open seat, succeeding one-term United Russia incumbent Roman Ptitsyn.

== Boundaries ==
1993–2007, 2016–present: Chemalsky District, Choysky District, Gorno-Altaysk, Kosh-Agachsky District, Mayminsky District, Ongudaysky District, Shebalinsky District, Turochaksky District, Ulagansky District, Ust-Kansky District, Ust-Koksinsky District
The constituency has been covering the entirety of the Altai Republic since its initial creation in 1993.

== Members elected ==
Election	Member	Party
1993	Mikhail Gnezdilov	Independent
1995	Semyon Zubakin (Note: elected Head of the Altai Republic in January 1998)	Democratic Choice of Russia – United Democrats
1998	Mikhail Lapshin (Note: elected Head of the Altai Republic in January 2002)	Independent
1999	Mikhail Lapshin	Fatherland – All Russia
2002	Sergey Pekpeyev	Independent
2003	Sergey Pekpeyev	Agrarian Party
2007	Proportional representation - no election by constituency	
2011	Proportional representation - no election by constituency	
2016	Rodion Bukachakov	United Russia
2021	Roman Ptitsyn	United Russia
2026	Alexander Surazov	United Russia

== Election results ==
=== 1993 ===
==== Declared candidates ====
- Mikhail Gnezdilov (Independent), First Deputy Premier the Altai Republic (1991–present)
- Sergey Pekpeyev (PRES), Member of Supreme Council of the Altai Republic (1992–present), bank president (previously ran as Civic Union candidate)
- Vyacheslav Piunov (DPR), law firm director
- Faina Yakshimayeva (Independent), Deputy Head of the Altai Republic Department of Justice

==== Results ====
Summary of the 12 December 1993 Russian legislative election in the Gorny Altai constituency
Candidate	Party	Votes	%
Mikhail Gnezdilov	Independent	18,560	23.02%
Faina Yakshimayeva	Independent	–	19.24%
Sergey Pekpeyev	Party of Russian Unity and Accord	–	–
Vyacheslav Piunov	Democratic Party	–	–
Total		80,642	100%

=== 1995 ===
==== Declared candidates ====
- Yevgeny Butov (KRO), Russian nationalist activist
- Nikolay Chekonov (CPRF), veterans' club chairman
- Mikhail Gnezdilov (Independent), incumbent Member of State Duma (1994–present), (previously ran as BIR, NDR and APR candidate)
- Vitaly Gurov (Forward, Russia!), economic zone director
- Vladimir Kydyyev (Independent), journalist
- Natalya Kyrova (Independent), law firm director
- Valery Sat (Independent), entrepreneur
- Vladilen Volkov (Independent), First Deputy Chairman of the State Assembly of the Altai Republic (1994–present)
- Faina Yakshimayeva (Independent), Judge of the Altai Republic Appellate Court (1995–present), 1993 candidate for this seat
- Semyon Zubakin (DVR–OD), Chief Financial Auditor of the Altai Republic (1994–present)

==== Results ====
Summary of the 17 December 1995 Russian legislative election in the Gorny Altai constituency
Candidate	Party	Votes	%
Semyon Zubakin	Democratic Choice of Russia – United Democrats	21,013	21.71%
Vladimir Kydyyev	Independent	16,731	17.29%
Mikhail Gnezdilov (incumbent)	Independent	11,937	12.33%
Nikolay Chekonov	Communist Party	11,228	11.60%
Natalya Kyrova	Independent	9,755	10.08%
Vladilen Volkov	Independent	6,648	6.87%
Faina Yakshimayeva	Independent	4,957	5.12%
Vitaly Gurov	Forward, Russia!	1,697	1.75%
Yevgeny Butov	Congress of Russian Communities	1,199	1.24%
Valery Sat	Independent	1,188	1.23%
Stanislav Kedik	Independent	449	0.46%
against all		7,791	8.05%
Total		96,779	100%

=== 1998 ===
==== Declared candidates ====
- Igor Chernov (Independent), Russian Army officer, 1997 head candidate
- Nina Dumnova (Independent), entrepreneur
- Mikhail Lapshin (Independent), former Member of State Duma (1994–1995), chairman of the Agrarian Party of Russia (1993–present)
- Yevgeny Myachin (Independent)
- Andrey Vavilov (Independent), former First Deputy Minister of Finance of Russia (1992–1997)

==== Withdrawn candidates ====
- Yury Antaradonov (Independent), First Deputy Head of the Altai Republic – Chairman of the Committee on State Property Management (1998–present), 1997 head candidate
- Aleksey Kuchigashev (Independent), journalist
- Grigory Kudryashov (Independent), journalist
- Vladimir Kydyyev (Independent), journalist, 1995 candidate for this seat
- Grigory Piltin (Independent), Member of State Assembly of the Altai Republic (1997–present)
- Pyotr Seleznev (Independent), corporate executive
- Gennady Sumin (Independent), Member of State Assembly of the Altai Republic (1996–present)

==== Did not file ====
- Grigory Chekurashev (Independent), former Minister of Economy of the Altai Republic (1997–1998)

==== Results ====
Summary of the 31 May 1998 by-election in the Gorny Altai constituency
Candidate	Party	Votes	%
Mikhail Lapshin	Independent	29,389	42.28%
Andrey Vavilov	Independent	28,298	40.71%
Igor Chernov	Independent	1,692	2.43%
Nina Dumnova	Independent	899	1.29%
Yevgeny Myachin	Independent	780	1.12%
against all		4,741	6.82%
Total		69,517	100%

=== 1999 ===
==== Declared candidates ====
- Yury Antaradonov (RSP), First Deputy Premier of the Altai Republic (1998–present), 1997 head candidate, 1998 candidate for this seat
- Yury Chernichenko (SPS), former Member of Federation Council from Moscow (1994–1996), chairman of the Peasant Party of Russia (1990–present)
- Mikhail Lapshin (OVR), incumbent Member of State Duma (1994–1995, 1998–present), chairman of the Agrarian Party of Russia (1993–present)
- Vladimir Petrov (NDR), former Premier of the Altai Republic (1990–1997), former People's Deputy of Russia (1990–1993), 1997 head candidate
- Viktor Romashkin (CPRF), Member of State Duma (1996–present), 1997 head candidate
- Dalel Sakharyanov (DN), director of the Modern University for the Humanities, Gorno-Altaysk branch
- Vladimir Slesarev (Unity), businessman
- Nadezhda Sukhoterina (Independent), middle school teacher
- Anatoly Yevdokimov (LDPR), coordinator of the party regional office

==== Withdrawn candidates ====
- Aleksandr Guryanov (Nikolayev–Fyodorov Bloc), Member of State Assembly of the Altai Republic (1997–present)

==== Did not file ====
- Aleksandr Gavrikov (Independent), former Military Commissioner of the Altai Republic (1988–1998)
- Viktor Martakov (Independent), construction businessman

==== Results ====
Summary of the 19 December 1999 Russian legislative election in the Gorny Altai constituency
Candidate	Party	Votes	%
Mikhail Lapshin (incumbent)	Fatherland – All Russia	30,774	32.11%
Yury Antaradonov	Russian Socialist Party	25,843	26.97%
Viktor Romashkin	Communist Party	14,358	14.98%
Vladimir Slesarev	Unity	6,730	7.02%
Vladimir Petrov	Our Home – Russia	6,078	6.34%
Nadezhda Sukhoterina	Independent	1,539	1.61%
Anatoly Yevdokimov	Liberal Democratic Party	1,182	1.23%
Yury Chernichenko	Union of Right Forces	1,087	1.13%
Dalel Sakharyanov	Spiritual Heritage	805	0.84%
against all		5,468	5.71%
Total		95,834	100%

=== 2002 ===
==== Declared candidates ====
- Vladimir Grishin (Independent), aide to State Duma member
- Sergey Kochetkov (Independent), unemployed
- Sergey Ognev (Independent), agriculture businessman
- Sergey Pekpeyev (Independent), First Deputy Minister of Economic Development of the Altai Republic (2002–present), 1993 candidate for this seat
- Leonid Shchuchinov (Independent), Member of State Assembly of the Altai Republic (1997–present), Deputy Chief Sanitary Doctor of the Altai Republic
- Aleksandr Shegay (Independent), Ministry of Economic Development and Trade of Russia official

==== Results ====
Summary of the 19 May 2002 by-election in the Gorny Altai constituency
Candidate	Party	Votes	%
Sergey Pekpeyev	Independent	26,845	48.57%
Sergey Ognev	Independent	10,606	19.19%
Vladimir Grishin	Independent	6,237	11.28%
Leonid Shchuchinov	Independent	4,927	8.91%
Aleksandr Shegay	Independent	865	1.56%
Sergey Kochetkov	Independent	690	1.25%
against all		3,462	6.26%
Total		55,273	100%

=== 2003 ===
==== Declared candidates ====
- Viktor Bezruchenkov (SPS), Deputy Chairman of the State Assembly of the Altai Republic (2002–present)
- Nikolay Chekonov (CPRF), former Member of State Assembly of the Altai Republic (1997–2001), 1995 candidate for this seat
- Nina Dumnova (Yabloko), aide to State Duma member, 1998 candidate for this seat, 2001 head candidate
- Vladimir Grishin (Rodina), aide to State Duma member, 2002 candidate for this seat
- Sergey Kochetkov (Independent), unemployed, 2002 candidate for this seat
- Aleksey Kuchigashev (Independent), journalist, 1998 candidate for this seat
- Mikhail Lazarev (LDPR), aide to State Duma member
- Sergey Pekpeyev (APR), incumbent Member of State Duma (2002–present)
- Yury Streltsov (Independent), cooperative chairman
- Igor Yeremin (Independent), businessman
- Tatyana Zharova (The Greens), director of the Siberian Academy of Public Administration, Gorno-Altaysk branch

==== Did not file ====
- Mikhail Karatunov (DPR), chairman of the party regional office
- Yury Khvostov (KPE), businessman
- Vasily Kudirmekov (Independent), construction businessman

==== Results ====
Summary of the 7 December 2003 Russian legislative election in the Gorny Altai constituency
Candidate	Party	Votes	%
Sergey Pekpeyev (incumbent)	Agrarian Party	32,730	39.62%
Yury Streltsov	Independent	18,653	22.58%
Viktor Bezruchenkov	Union of Right Forces	8,324	10.08%
Nikolay Chekonov	Communist Party	5,315	6.43%
Igor Yeremin	Independent	4,121	4.99%
Nina Dumnova	Independent	2,492	3.02%
Mikhail Lazarev	Liberal Democratic Party	1,701	2.06%
Tatyana Zharova	The Greens	1,323	1.60%
Vladimir Grishin	Rodina	1,272	1.54%
Aleksey Kuchigashev	Independent	500	0.61%
Sergey Kochetkov	Independent	332	0.40%
against all		4,837	5.86%
Total		82,614	100%

=== 2016 ===
==== Declared candidates ====
- Rodion Bukachakov (United Russia), Head of Chemalsky District (2003–2008, 2013–present)
- Aleksandr Chervov (CPCR), homemaker
- Maria Demina (Rodina), former Member of State Assembly of the Altai Republic (2006–2010)
- Dmitry Dumnov (Yabloko), community activist
- Aleksandr Gruzdev (A Just Russia), Member of State Assembly of the Altai Republic (2010–present)
- Timur Kazitov (LDPR), former Member of Ust-Kansky District Council of Deputies (2008–2013), surgeon
- Urmat Knyazev (PARNAS), Member of Ust-Kansky District Council of Deputies (2013–present), former Member of State Assembly of the Altai Republic (2006–2013), 2014 GI head candidate
- Viktor Romashkin (CPRF), Member of State Assembly of the Altai Republic (1994–1995, 2006–present), former Member of State Duma (1996–1999), 1997, 2001 and 2014 head candidate, 1999 candidate for this seat
- Irina Zveryako (GS), primary school teacher

==== Withdrawn candidates ====
- Aleksandr Chekonov (The Greens), agricultural tekhnikum director
- Vecheslav Kydatov (Party of Growth), Member of State Assembly of the Altai Republic (1994–1997, 2014–present), agriculture businessman
- Gennady Sumin (Patriots of Russia), Member of State Assembly of the Altai Republic (1996–2001, 2014–present), 1998 candidate for this seat

==== Failed to qualify ====
- Sergey Afanasyev (Independent), gymnasium teacher
- Amyr Aitashev (Independent), Altai activist
- Aleksandr Gagalchiy (Independent), businessman
- Sergey Mikhaylov (Independent), former Member of State Assembly of the Altai Republic (2010–2014), journalist, 2014 PARNAS head candidate
- Dmitry Pimenov (Independent), unemployed
- Denis Safiyanov (Independent), unemployed

==== Declined ====
- Ivan Belekov (United Russia), Chairman of the State Assembly of the Altai Republic (2006–present), Member of the State Assembly (1993–2002, 2006–present) (won the primary, ran on the party list)
- Leonid Maikov (United Russia), former Head of Ust-Kansky District (2002–2013) (lost the primary)
- Viktor Oblogin (United Russia), Mayor of Gorno-Altaysk (1992–present) (lost the primary)

==== Results ====
Summary of the 18 September 2016 Russian legislative election in the Altai constituency
Candidate	Party	Votes	%
Rodion Bukachakov	United Russia	32,000	44.79%
Viktor Romashkin	Communist Party	14,571	20.39%
Maria Demina	Rodina	9,588	13.42%
Timur Kazitov	Liberal Democratic Party	6,103	8.54%
Urmat Knyazev	People's Freedom Party	3,523	4.93%
Aleksandr Gruzdev	A Just Russia	1,969	2.76%
Dmitry Dumnov	Yabloko	687	0.96%
Irina Zveryako	Civilian Power	595	0.83%
Aleksandr Chervov	Communists of Russia	366	0.51%
Total		71,452	100%

=== 2021 ===
==== Declared candidates ====
- Maria Ardimatova (New People), farmer, community activist
- Maria Demina (CPRF), Member of State Assembly of the Altai Republic (2006–2010, 2019–present), 2016 Rodina candidate for this seat
- Vasily Kudirmekov (RPSS), former Member of Gorno-Altaysk City Council of Deputies (2012–2017), journalist, 2003 candidate for this seat
- Roman Ptitsyn (United Russia), Head of Mayminsky District (2018–present), former First Deputy Premier of the Altai Republic (2018)
- Lyudmila Shuvalova (The Greens), think tank director
- Dmitry Sofronov (LDPR), Member of State Assembly of the Altai Republic (2019–present), 2019 head candidate
- Nikolay Tolkochokov (RPPSS), retired militsiya podpolkovnik
- Yelena Tudeneva (CPCR), former Chairwoman of the Ulagansky District Accounts Chamber
- Aleksey Tyukhtenev (SR–ZP), former First Deputy Premier of the Altai Republic (2013, 2019–2020)

==== Failed to qualify ====
- Nikolay Babushkin (Independent), energy executive

==== Declined ====
- Ivan Belekov (United Russia), Member of State Duma (2016–present) (lost the primary, ran on the party list)
- Rodion Bukachakov (United Russia), incumbent Member of State Duma (2016–present) (lost the primary)
- Aidar Myzin (United Russia), Member of State Assembly of the Altai Republic (2019–present) (lost the primary)
- Vitaly Uin (United Russia), former Member of Gorno-Altaysk City Council of Deputies (2017–2018), 2011 World Champion sambist (lost the primary, ran on the party list)

==== Results ====
Summary of the 17-19 September 2021 Russian legislative election in the Altai constituency
Candidate	Party	Votes	%
Roman Ptitsyn	United Russia	23,545	31.99%
Maria Demina	Communist Party	21,967	29.84%
Aleksey Tyukhtenev	A Just Russia — For Truth	11,843	16.09%
Dmitry Sofronov	Liberal Democratic Party	3,824	5.20%
Maria Ardimatova	New People	2,753	3.74%
Vasily Kudirmekov	Russian Party of Freedom and Justice	2,490	3.38%
Yelena Tudeneva	Communists of Russia	1,944	2.64%
Nikolay Tolkochokov	Party of Pensioners	1,654	2.25%
Lyudmila Shuvalova	The Greens	1,378	1.87%
Total		73,609	100%

=== 2026 ===
==== Declared candidates ====
- Airat Bakrasov (New People), Director of the Altai Republic Department of Capital Construction (2024–present)
- Arzhan Bakrasov (CPRF), former Member of Ust-Kansky District Council of Deputies (2018–2023), party secretary
- Aleksandr Gruzdev (A Just Russia), Member of State Assembly of the Altai Republic (2010–present), aide to State Duma member, 2016 candidate for this seat
- Sergey Kukhtuyekov (Yabloko), former Member of State Assembly of the Altai Republic (2019–2024), 2024 Civic Initiative head candidate
- Pavel Pastukhov (CPCR), first secretary of the party regional committee
- Roman Rekhtin (LDPR), Member of State Assembly of the Altai Republic (2024–present)
- Alexander Surazov (United Russia), Minister of Youth Policy and Sport of the Altai Republic (2024–present)

==== Declined ====
- Roman Ptitsyn (United Russia), incumbent Member of State Duma (2021–present)

==== Results ====
Summary of the 18-20 September 2026 Russian legislative election in the Altai constituency
Candidate	Party	Votes	%
Alexander Surazov	United Russia	36,804	49.17%
Arzhan Bakrasov	Communist Party	15,618	20.87%
Airat Bakrasov	New People	5,145	6.87%
Sergey Kukhtuyekov	Yabloko	5,099	6.81%
Roman Rekhtin	Liberal Democratic Party	5,006	6.69%
Aleksandr Gruzdev	A Just Russia	2,895	3.87%
Pavel Pastukhov	Communists of Russia	2,858	3.82%
Total		74,850	100%
