= Myuta =

Myuta Мыюта
- Selo
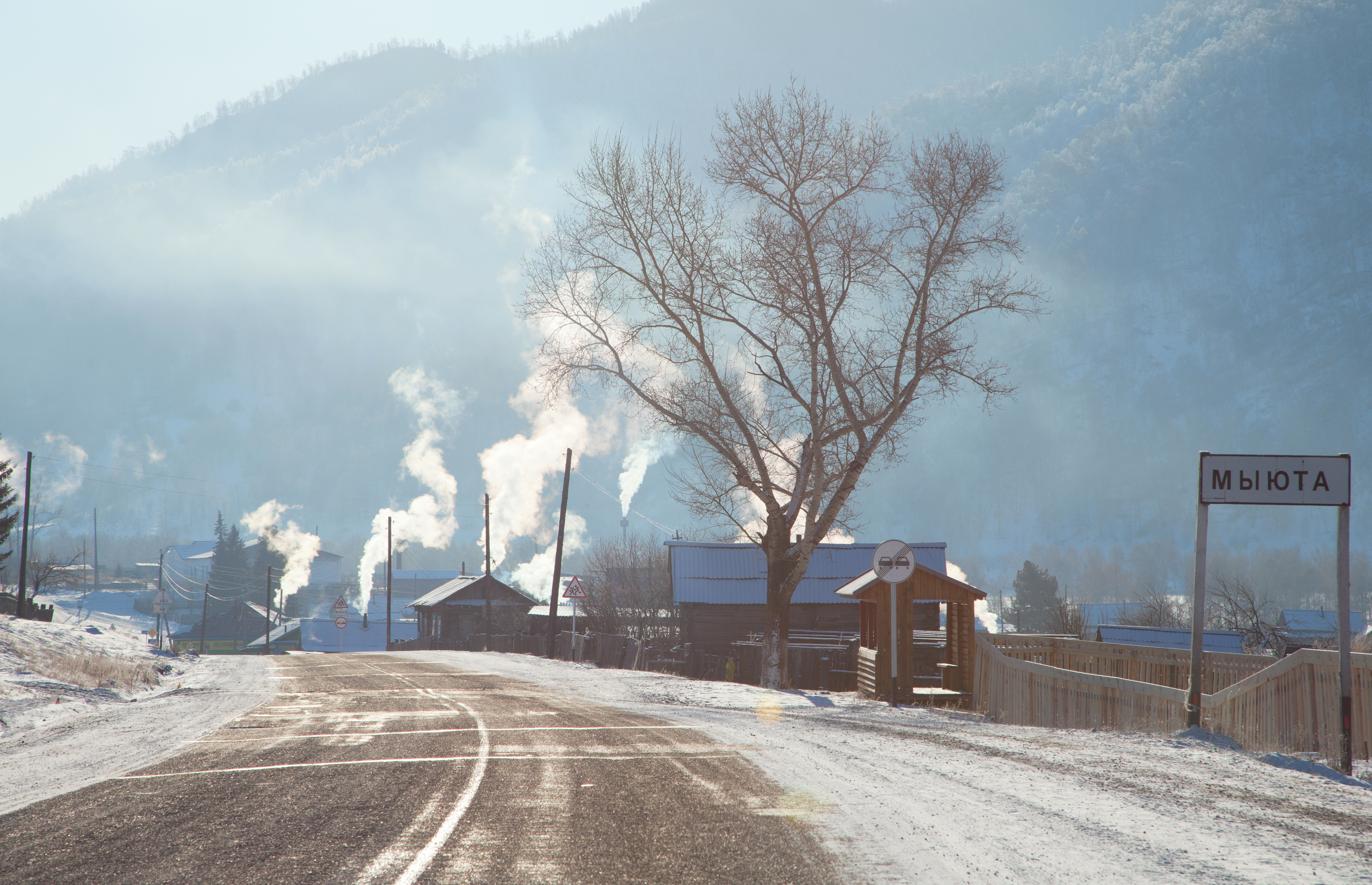

- Location within Altai Republic Location within Russia
- Coordinates: 51°25′N 85°37′E
- Country: Russia
- Region: Altai Republic
- District: Shebalinsky District
- Time zone: UTC+7:00

Myuta (Russian: Мыюта; Altay: Мыйту, Mıytu) is a rural locality (a selo) in Shebalinsky District, the Altai Republic, Russia. The population was 274 as of 2016. There are 6 streets.

== Geography ==
Myuta is located 16 km north of Shebalino (the district's administrative centre) by road. Cherga and Shebalino are the nearest rural localities.
