= Malaya Cherga =

Malaya Cherga Малая Черга
- Selo
- Location within Altai Republic Location within Russia
- Coordinates: 51°20′N 85°33′E
- Country: Russia
- Region: Altai Republic
- District: Shebalinsky District
- Time zone: UTC+7:00

Malaya Cherga (Russian: Малая Черга; Altay: Чичке-Чаргы, Çiçke-Çargı) is a rural locality (a selo) and the administrative centre of malocherginskoye Rural Settlement, Shebalinsky District, the Altai Republic, Russia. The population was 216 as of 2016. There are 4 streets.

== Geography ==
Malaya Cherga is located 17 km northwest of Shebalino (the district's administrative centre) by road. Arbayta is the nearest rural locality.
