= List of chairmen of the State Assembly of the Altai Republic =

This is a list of chairmen (speakers) of the Supreme Council of the Altai Republic of Russia:

Name	Entered office	Left office
Valery Chaptynov	July 3, 1991	February 1, 1994

This is a list of chairmen (speakers) of the State Assembly of the Altai Republic:

Name	Entered office	Left office
Valery Chaptynov	February 1, 1994	January 30, 1997
Vladilen Volkov	January 30, 1997	August 19, 1997
Daniil Tabayev	August 19, 1997	December 16, 2001
Igor Yaimov	January 15, 2002	March 2006
Ivan Belekov	March 2006	Present
