= Head of the Altai Republic =

Highest-ranking official in the Altai Republic, Russia

- Алтай Республиканыҥ башкарузы (Altay); Глава Республики Алтай (Russian)
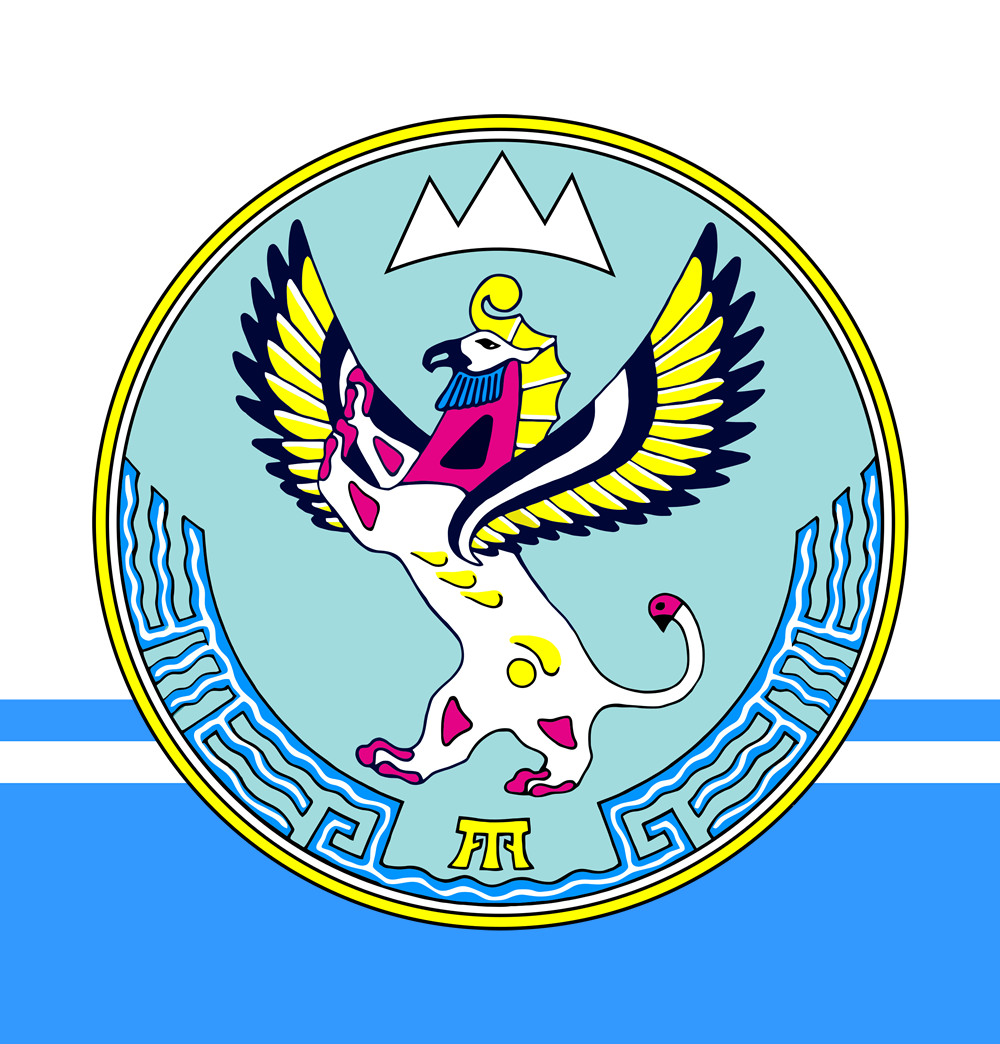
- Standard of the head of Altai Republic

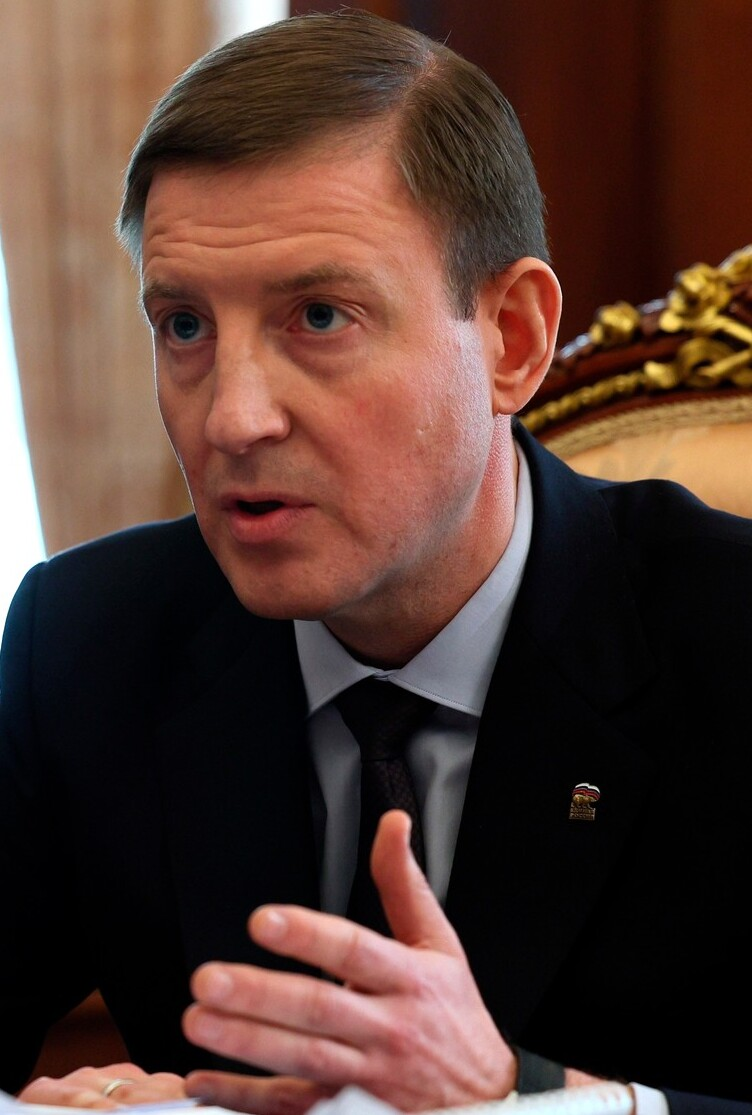
- Incumbent; Andrey Turchak since 3 October 2024
- Executive branch of the Altai Republic
- Style: His Excellency; The Honorable
- Type: Governor; Head of state; Head of government
- Seat: Gorno-Altaysk
- Term length: Five years, renewable once
- Precursor: Chairman of the Altai Autonomous Oblast's ispolkom
- Formation: 1 February 1994; June 1997 (current form)
- First holder: Valery Chaptynov
- Salary: $1,839 per month
- Website: Official website

The head of the Altai Republic (Russian: Глава Республики Алтай, romanized: Glava Respubliki Altay, Altay: Алтай Республиканыҥ башкарузы, romanized: Altay Respublikanıñ başqaruzı) is the head of the republic and government of Altai Republic, the federal subject of Russia. The head of the Republic is elected by the citizens of Altai Republic for five years.

== Powers ==
The powers of The head of the Republic are regulated by chapters 10 and 11 of the Constitution of the Altai Republic.

- Represents the Republic of Altai Republic in relations with Federal bodies of state power, bodies of state power of subjects of the Russian Federation, bodies of local self-government and the implementation of foreign economic relations, the right to sign contracts and agreements on behalf of the Republic of Altai;
- promulgates the laws of the Altai Republic, certifying their publication by signing, or rejects the laws adopted by the State Assembly — El Kurultai of the Altai Republic;
- forms the Government of Altai Republic in accordance with the legislation of Altai Republic;
- defines the structure of the Executive bodies of state power of the Altai Republic;
- with the consent Of the State Assembly — El Kurultai of the Altai Republic appoints members of the government of the Altai Republic, the list of which is determined by the Constitution;
- it has the right to demand the convening of an extraordinary session of the State Assembly — El Kurultai of the Altai Republic, as well as to convene a newly elected state Assembly-El Kurultai of the Altai Republic for the first session before the deadline established by the Constitution;
- has the right to participate in the work of the State Assembly — El Kurultai of the Altai Republic with the right of consultative vote;
- has the right of legislative initiative in the State Assembly — El Kurultai of the Altai Republic;
- annually submits to the State Assembly — El Kurultai of the Altai Republic the draft budget of the Altai Republic and the report on its execution;
- submits to the State Assembly — El Kurultai of the Altai Republic projects of socio - economic development programs of the Altai Republic and reports on their implementation;
- has the right to make the decision on early termination of powers of the State Assembly — El Kurultay of Altai Republic on the bases and in the order provided by the legislation;
- appoints and recalls representatives of the Altai Republic in the bodies of state power of the Russian Federation and its subjects;
- appoint a Senator — representative from the Government of the Altai Republic;
- appoints half the members of the Election Commission of the Altai Republic;
- award state decorations of the Republic of Altai Republic and confer honorary titles of the Republic of Altai in accordance with the legislation;
- appeals to the Constitutional Court of Russia;
- submits to the State Assembly — El Kurultai of the Altai Republic annual reports on the situation in the Republic;
- it has the right to decide on the resignation of the government of the Republic, some of its members, as well as voluntary resignation of members of the Government;
- forms a unified apparatus of the head and the government of the Altai Republic;
- provides coordination of activity of Executive authorities of the Republic of Altai with other public authorities of the Republic of Altai and according to the legislation of the Russian Federation can organize interaction of Executive authorities of the Republic of Altai with Federal Executive authorities and their territorial authorities, local governments and public associations;
- exercises other powers in accordance with Federal laws, this Constitution and the laws of the Altai Republic.

== List ==
=== Preceding offices ===
Since the first free election of 1990, the Gorno-Altai Autonomous Oblast, then a devolved entity within Altai Krai, was effectively governed as a parliamentary republic with chairman of the Council (Soviet) of People's Deputies serving as the head of state. In 1991, the oblast declared itself a separate federal subject of Russia, the Gorno-Altai ASSR, later renamed Altai Republic. Following a snap legislative election in December 1991, the Council of People's Deputies and the executive committee were replaced with the Supreme Soviet and Government of the Republic. Their respective chairmen, Valery Chaptynov and Vladimir Petrov, kept their positions.

During the early 1990s Altai was an outlier among republics of Russia, as most of them were transformed into presidential republics, and former Supreme Soviet speakers usually emerged as the strongest contenders for presidency. In 1994, Chaptynov, unsure about his prospects in a hypothetical popular vote, proposed an amendment to create an indirectly elected office of the Head of the Republic combined with that of a speaker of the newly created State Assembly of the Altai Republic.

In January 1997, Petrov was ousted from premiership and replaced by Chaptynov who was preparing to run in the election that was expected to be held later that year. He was succeeded as Head of the Republic by Vladilen Volkov, a former Soviet military advisor in Afghanistan and first secretary of Gorno-Altaysk Communist Party gorkom.

No.	Portrait	Head of state	Term of office	Portrait	Head of government	Term of office	Election	Ref.
–		Valery Chaptynov (1945–1997)	27 March 1990 – 5 February 1992 (Note: Chairman of the Council of People's Deputies of the Gorno-Altai Autonomous Oblast)		Vladimir Petrov (born 1942)	27 March 1990 – 9 February 1992 (Note: Chairman of the Executive Committee of the Gorno-Altai Autonomous Oblast)	1990	
–		Valery Chaptynov (1945–1997)	5 February 1992 – 1 February 1994 (Note: Chairman of the Supreme Soviet of the Altai Republic)		Vladimir Petrov (born 1942)	9 February 1992 – 23 January 1997 (Note: Chairman of the Government (premier))	1991	
1		Valery Chaptynov (1945–1997)	1 February 1994 – 30 January 1997 (Note: Head of the Republic, Chairman of the State Assembly)		Vladimir Petrov (born 1942)	9 February 1992 – 23 January 1997	1993	
2		Vladilen Volkov (born 1939)	30 January 1997 – 19 August 1997		Valery Chaptynov (1945–1997)	30 January 1997 – 10 August 1997 (died in office)	1993	
2		Vladilen Volkov (born 1939)	30 January 1997 – 19 August 1997		Mikhail Gnezdilov (1946–2014)	10 August 1997 – 19 August 1997 (Note: Acting premier)	1993	

In June 1997, a new constitution was adopted, where the positions of Head of the Republic and premier were effectively merged. Chaptynov's sudden death in August led to Volkov becoming the first executive Head while giving up the speakership. In the subsequent election, he lost to State Duma member and former financial controller Semyon Zubakin.

=== Head of the Republic (as chief executive) ===
No.	Portrait	Name (born–died)	Term of office			Political party	Election	Ref.
No.	Portrait	Name (born–died)	Took office	Left office	Time in office	Political party	Election	Ref.
2		Vladilen Volkov (born 1939)	19 August 1997	13 January 1998	147 days	Independent	08/1997 (Note: Indirect election)	
3		Semyon Zubakin (born 1952)	13 January 1998	19 January 2002	4 years, 6 days	Democratic Choice	12/1997	
3		Semyon Zubakin (born 1952)	13 January 1998	19 January 2002	4 years, 6 days	Union of Right Forces	12/1997	
4		Mikhail Lapshin (1934–2006)	19 January 2002	20 January 2006	4 years, 1 day	Agrarian Party	2001–02	
5		Alexander Berdnikov (born 1953)	20 January 2006	18 January 2014	13 years, 59 days	United Russia	2005 (Note: Appointed by the President of Russia with the consent of the State Assembly); 2010	
–		Alexander Berdnikov (born 1953)	18 January 2014	30 September 2014	13 years, 59 days	United Russia	– (Note: Acting head of the republic)	
(5)		Alexander Berdnikov (born 1953)	30 September 2014	20 March 2019	13 years, 59 days	United Russia	2014	
–		Oleg Khorokhordin (born 1972)	20 March 2019	1 October 2019	5 years, 76 days	Independent	–	
6		Oleg Khorokhordin (born 1972)	1 October 2019	4 June 2024	5 years, 76 days	Independent	2019	
–		Andrey Turchak (born 1975)	4 June 2024	3 October 2024	2 years, 139 days	United Russia	–	
7		Andrey Turchak (born 1975)	3 October 2024	Incumbent	2 years, 139 days	United Russia	2024	

== Sources ==
- Russian Administrative divisions
- Kynev, Aleksandr (2020). Губернаторы в России: между выборами и назначениями [Governors in Russia: Between Elections and Appointments] (in Russian). ISBN 978-5-903135-68-4.
