= Valery Chaptynov =

Russian politician (1945–1997)

- Валерий Чаптынов
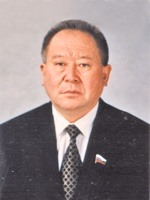

Prime Minister of the Altai Republic
- In office 30 January 1997 – 10 August 1997
- Preceded by: Vladimir Petrov
- Succeeded by: Vladilen Volkov

Head of the Altai Republic and Chairman of the State Assembly
- In office 1 March 1994 – 30 January 1997
- Preceded by: Himself as Chairman of the Supreme Soviet
- Succeeded by: Vladilen Volkov

Chairman of the Supreme Soviet of the Gorno-Altai ASSR
- In office 27 March 1990 – 1994
- Succeeded by: Himself as Chairman of the State Assembly

Personal details
- Born: Valery Ivanovich Chaptynov; 11 June 1945 Verkh-Apshuyakhta, Shebalinsky District, Oirot AO, Russian SFSR, Soviet Union
- Died: 10 August 1997 (aged 52) Moscow, Russia
- Awards: Order of the Red Banner of Labour Order of the Badge of Honour

Valery Ivanovich Chaptynov (Russian: Валерий Иванович Чаптынов; 11 June 1945 – 10 August 1997) was a Russian politician. He was the first Head of the Altai Republic, the first Member of the Federation Council from the Altai Republic, and Chairman of the Presidium of the Supreme Soviet and First Secretary of the Gorno-Altai Communist Party for the duration of the short-lived Gorno-Altai Autonomous Soviet Socialist Republic.
