= 1997 Russian gubernatorial elections =

- 12 January – 28 December 1997

14 Heads of Federal Subjects from 89
- 1997 Russian regional elections: Gubernatorial Gubernatorial (of another subject) Legislative Legislative (of another subject) Two legislative elections (including one of another subject) Gubernatorial and legislative Referendum and legislative Referendum and gubernatorial

Gubernatorial elections in 1997 took place in 14 regions of the Russian Federation.

== Background ==
In January–March 1997, the process of holding first gubernatorial elections in all regions of Russia, which began in September 1996, was practically completed. By January 1, six governors-appointees remained in power: Leonid Roketsky in Tyumen Oblast, Yury Lyashko in Amur Oblast, Bolot Ayushiyev in ABAO, Nikolai Sevryugin in Tula Oblast, Mikhail Kislyuk in Kemerovo Oblast and Anatoly Yakimov in Evenkia. By April only Kislyuk remained in office, instead of whom Aman Tuleyev was appointed on June 30.

In the first quarter of 1997, re-elections of presidents of four republics (Mari El, Adygea, Kabardino-Balkaria, Tuva) and presidential elections in the breakaway Chechen Republic of Ichkeria were also held. In the summer, early elections were held for the governors of Nizhny Novgorod and Irkutsk Oblasts after resignations of Boris Nemtsov and Yury Nozhikov, and in the fall the head of Kemerovo Oblast administration was elected.

By decision of the legislative assemblies, re-elections of the head of the administration of Oryol Oblast and the head of the Komi Republic were held six months ahead of schedule. In December, the re-election in Chuvashia and the first election of the Head of the Altai Republic took place.

== Results ==
Federal subject	Incumbent	Incumbent since	Election day	Candidates	Result
Mari El	see 1996 elections		4 January (runoff)	see 1996 elections	
Tyumen Oblast	see 1996 elections		12 January (runoff)	see 1996 elections	
Adygea	Aslan Dzharimov	1992	12 January	✓ Aslan Dzharimov 57.80%; Aslanbiy Sovmiz 19.51%; Kazbek Tsiku (CPRF) 15.76%	Incumbent re-elected.
Kabardino-Balkaria	Valery Kokov	1992	12 January	✓ Valery Kokov 99.35% (ran unopposed)	Incumbent re-elected.
Agin-Buryat AO (revote)	Bolot Ayushiyev (resigned)	1996	23 February	✓ Bair Zhamsuyev (OKS) 44.56%; Yury Dondokov 33.03%; Bato-Tsyren Abiduyev 9.39%; Namdak Zhambalov 8.71%	New governor elected to a vacant position.
Tuva	Sherig-ool Oorzhak	1992	16 March	✓ Sherig-ool Oorzhak 70.61%; Kaadyr-ool Bicheldey 10.13%; Aleksandr Kashin (LDPR) 8.20%	Incumbent re-elected.
Evenkia (revote)	Anatoly Yakimov	1991	16 March	✓ Aleksandr Bokovikov (NPSR) 49.00%; Anatoly Yakimov (OKS) 40.45%	Incumbent lost election. New governor elected.
Amur Oblast (revote)	Yury Lyashko	1996	23 March	✓ Anatoly Belonogov (CPRF/NPSR) 60.51%; Yury Lyashko (OKS) 24.41%; Against all 5.86%	Incumbent lost election. New governor elected.
Tula Oblast	Nikolai Sevryugin	1991	23 March	✓ Vasily Starodubtsev (CPRF/NPSR) 62.82%; Viktor Sokolovsky (OKS) 15.08%; Nikolai Sevryugin 4.76%	Incumbent lost election. New governor elected.
Nizhny Novgorod Oblast (snap election)	Boris Nemtsov (resigned); Yury Lebedev (acting)	1991	29 June (first round)	Ivan Sklyarov 40.95%; Gennady Khodyrev (CPRF) 37.84%; Vadim Bulavinov 8.15%; Nina Zvereva 6.88%	New governor elected to a vacant position.
Nizhny Novgorod Oblast (snap election)	Boris Nemtsov (resigned); Yury Lebedev (acting)	1991	13 July (runoff)	✓ Ivan Sklyarov 52.04%; Gennady Khodyrev (CPRF) 42.15%	New governor elected to a vacant position.
Irkutsk Oblast (snap election)	Yury Nozhikov (resigned); Viktor Ivanov (acting)	1991	27 July	✓ Boris Govorin (NDR/OKS) 53.54%; Sergey Levchenko (CPRF/NPSR) 20.02%; Viktor Mashinsky 14.84%; Ivan Shchadov 7.72%	New governor elected to a vacant position.
Kemerovo Oblast	Aman Tuleyev	1997	19 October	✓ Aman Tuleyev (NPSR) 94.54%; Viktor Medikov 2.08%	Incumbent elected to full term.
Oryol Oblast (snap election)	Yegor Stroyev	1993	26 October	✓ Yegor Stroyev 91.62%; Vera Yenina 2.83%	Incumbent re-elected.
Komi (snap election)	Yury Spiridonov	1994	30 November	✓ Yury Spiridonov (NDR) 57.19%; Rita Chistokhodova 19.83%; Vasily Kuznetsov (CPRF) 9.17%; Against all 5.43%	Incumbent re-elected.
Altai Republic	Vladilen Volkov	1997	14 December	✓ Semyon Zubakin (DVR) 23.5%; Yury Antaradonov 23.28%; Viktor Romashkin (CPRF) 17.62%; Vladimir Petrov 13.89%; Vladilen Volkov 11.97%	Incumbent lost election. New head elected.
Chuvashia	Nikolay Fyodorov	1993	28 December	✓ Nikolay Fyodorov 56.70%; Valentin Shurchanov (CPRF) 34.85%	Incumbent re-elected.

== Sources ==
- Ivanov, Vitaly (2019). Глава субъекта Российской Федерации. История губернаторов. Том I [Head of the subject of the Russian Federation. History of governors. Volume I] (in Russian). ISBN 978-5-907250-14-7.
