= Gorno–Altai Regional Committee of the Communist Party of the Soviet Union =

Soviet political committee, 1922–1991

The Gorno–Altai Regional Committee of the Communist Party of the Soviet Union, commonly referred to as the Gorno–Altai CPSU obkom, was the position of highest authority in the Oyrot AO (1922–1948), Gorno-Altai AO (1948–1990), Gorno-Altai ASSR (1990–1991) and the Gorno-Altai SSR (1990–1991) in the Russian SFSR of the Soviet Union. The position was created on June 1, 1922, and abolished on August 23, 1991. The First Secretary was a de facto appointed position usually by the Politburo or the General Secretary himself.

== List of First Secretaries of the Gorno–Altai Communist Party ==
| Name | Term of Office | | Life years |
| Name | Start | End | Life years |
First Secretaries of the Oblast Committee of the Communist Party
| Leonid Paparde | June 1, 1922 | August 1922 | 1893–1938 |
| Pyotr Gordienko | August 1922 | September 1924 | 1891–1938 |
| Leonid Paparde | September 1924 | September 1928 | 1893–1938 |
| Anisim Nelyubin | September 1928 | March 17, 1930 | 1897–? |
| F.V. Istomin | March 17, 1930 | June 1930 | 1899–? |
| Pyotr Gordienko | June 1930 | November 1932 | 1891–1938 |
| Pavel Khabarov | December 1932 | June 22, 1936 | 1904–1937 |
| Mark Novakovsky | June 22, 1936 | March 28, 1937 | 1894–1978 |
| Samuil Yufit | March 28, 1937 | February 12, 1938 | 1902–? |
| Fyodor Antonov | February 12, 1938 | November 19, 1943 | 1899–? |
| Ivan Pechenov | November 19, 1943 | November 29, 1946 | 1899–? |
| Aleksandr Sapego | November 29, 1946 | February 29, 1948 | |
| Chet Kydrashev | February 29, 1948 | October 2, 1949 | 1914–1997 |
| Ivan Kolomin | October 2, 1949 | March 9, 1950 | 1912–1950 |
| Nikolay Soroka | March 1950 | March 1955 | 1909– |
| Nikolay Kiselyov | March 1955 | January 1960 | 1922–1976 |
| Roman Dorohov | January 1960 | May 5, 1964 | 1915–1964 |
| Nikolay Lazebny | May 1964 | October 1978 | 1919–1991 |
| Yury Znamensky | October 1978 | May 21, 1988 | 1929–2006 |
| Dmitry Nartov | May 21, 1988 | October 6, 1988 | 1939–1988 |
| Vladimir Gusev | November 5, 1988 | March 9, 1990 | 1938– |
| Valery Chaptynov | April 28, 1990 | August 23, 1991 | 1945–1997 |

== See also ==
- Gorno-Altai Autonomous Oblast
- Gorno-Altai Autonomous Soviet Socialist Republic

== Sources ==
- World Statesmen.org
