= Verkh-Apshuyakhta =

Verkh-Apshuyakhta Верх-Апшуяхта
- Village
- Location within Altai Republic Location within Russia
- Coordinates: 51°14′N 85°53′E
- Country: Russia
- Region: Altai Republic
- District: Shebalinsky District
- Time zone: UTC+7:00

Verkh-Apshuyakhta (Russian: Верх-Апшуяхта; Altay: Апшыйакты, romanized: Apşıyaqtı) is a rural locality (a selo) in Shebalinsky District, the Altai Republic, Russia. The population was 269 as of 2016. There are 3 streets.

== Geography ==
Verkh-Apshuyakhta is located near the Apshuyakhta River, 21 km southeast of Shebalino (the district's administrative centre) by road. Yelanda is the nearest rural locality.
