= Khorokhordin =

Khorokhordin is a Russian surname. Notable people with the surname include:

- Oleg Khorokhordin (born 1972), Russian politician
- Sergey Khorokhordin (born 1985), Russian artistic gymnast
