= Alexander Surazov =

Russian politician (born 1999)

Member of the State Duma
- Assuming office 30 September 2026
- Succeeding: Roman Ptitsyn
- Constituency: Altai constituency (No.2)

Personal details
- Born: 25 September 1999 (age 27)
- Party: United Russia

Alexander Germanovich Surazov (Russian: Александр Германович Суразов; born 25 September 1999) is a Russian politician who was elected member of the State Duma in 2026. He has served as minister of sports and youth policy of the Altai Republic since 2024.
