= Aruna Arna =

- Арна Аруна Александр кысы
- Born: March 30, 1986 (age 40); Gorno-Altaysk, Altai Republic, USSR
- Education: Tomsk Polytechnic University Gorno-Altaisk State University
- Known for: Leader of the protests in Altai

Aruna Aleksandrovna Arna (Altay: Аруна Александр кысы Арна, romanized: Aruna Aleksandr qısı Arna) is a public figure from the Altai Republic, the homeland of Altai peoples. She is a human rights activist and journalist, as well as the head of the public organisation 'Council of Residents of the Altai Republic'.

== Early life and education ==
She was born on 30 March 1986 in Gorno-Altaysk. She graduated from Tomsk Polytechnic University in 2008 and Gorno-Altaysk State University in 2012.

In 2019, she founded the Council of Residents of the Altai Republic and began campaigning to protect Altai land.

In 2023, Russian security forces conducted a nine-hour search of her home despite her being pregnant and at risk of miscarriage. In June 2024, she was fined 180,000 roubles for posting about fraud in the Russian presidential election. In December, she faced administrative proceedings for allegedly spreading false information.

In June 2025, she organised protests in the republic against the abolition of village councils and amendments to the constitution.

She opposes the merger of the Altai Republic with the Altai Krai and refers to herself as the people's candidate for head of the republic.

A criminal case has been opened against her on charges of incitement to terrorism. For these charges on 1 June 2026 a Russian court found Aruna guilty and sentenced her to five years in prison for publishing dissident material, i.e. protest videos set to songs "Warszawianka (The Song of Warsaw)" and "The Internationale".
