= Alexander Berdnikov =

Russian politician (born 1953)

- Александр Бердников
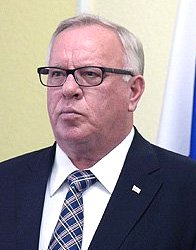
- Berdnikov in 2014

5th Head of the Altai Republic
- In office 26 January 2006 – 20 March 2019
- Preceded by: Mikhail Lapshin
- Succeeded by: Oleg Khorokhordin

Personal details
- Born: April 8, 1953 (age 72) Gorno-Altaysk, Gorno-Altai AO, Russian SFSR, USSR
- Party: United Russia
- Children: 1
- Profession: Border guard

Alexander Vasilyevich Berdnikov (Russian: Александр Васильевич Бердников; born April 8, 1953) is a Russian politician, and was Head of the Altai Republic from 2006 to 2019.

He took office on January 20, 2006. He was a candidate in the December 2001 election for that position, receiving 9.6% of the vote and coming in sixth place. In 2004, a new law stopped direct elections for Russian administrative division leaders. In December 2005, Berdnikov was nominated by Vladimir Putin and confirmed by the State Assembly of the Altai Republic, succeeding Mikhail Lapshin.

== Scandals ==
His 12-year term has been plagued by multiple scandals, such as the Altaigate scandal.

In 2017, the Altai newspaper Listok published a transcript of conversations between Aleksandr Berdnikov and a local blogger, in which Berdnikov used obscene and offensive language when referring to ethnic Altai people. Following the publication, Berdnikov issued a public apology, dropped to the bottom of the governors' performance rankings, and left his post two years later.

== Family ==
Alexander Vasilyevich Berdnikov is married and has a son.

== Awards ==
- 2013 - Order of Friendship
- 2003 - Medal of the Order of Merit for the Fatherland, II degree
- Medals "For Impeccable Service" I, II and III degrees
- Medal "For assistance to the internal troops"
- Order of Holy Prince Daniel of Moscow

Political offices
| Preceded by Mikhail Lapshin | Head of the Altai Republic; 2006-present | Incumbent |
