= Islam in the Altai Republic =

Islam is practiced by 6.2% of the population of the Altai Republic. Although the local Altai people predominantly follow Burkhanism and Shamanism and Russian people follow Russian Orthodoxy, according to official estimates, ethnic Kazakhs in the Altai Republic, who number at around 12,500, are predominantly Sunni Muslims.

== See also ==
- Islam in Russia
