= State Anthem of the Altai Republic =

Altay Respublikanıñ gimnı
English: State Anthem of the Altai Republic
- Алтай Республиканыҥ гимны
- Coat of arms of Altai Republic
- Regional anthem of the Altai Republic, Russia
- Also known as: «Государственный гимн Республики Алтай»
- Lyrics: Arzhan Adarov
- Music: Vladimir Peshnyak
- Adopted: 11 September 2001

Audio sample
- Official orchestral rendition in E major: file; help

Instrumental recording of the anthem

The State Anthem of the Altai Republic was composed by Vladimir Peshnyak and written by Arzhan Adarov. It was officially adopted and approved by the State Assembly of the Altai Republic on 11 September 2001.

== Lyrics ==
The first three verses are sung in the Republic's official and native language—Altai, and the last two are sung in the Republic's state official language—Russian.

Altai and Russian

Cyrillic script

Кӧк теҥери јылдыстар,
Улу, јайым Кан-Алтай.
Ӱч-сӱмер, ыйык тайгалар
Агару, јебрен Алтай.

Ӱч толыкту Кан-Алтай
Јыҥкыс эдер јаҥы јок.
Ӱргӱлји кӱйген одыбыс
Ӧчӱп калар учуры јок.

Алтай – ӧскӧн кабайыс,
Алтай – мӧҥкӱ кудайыс.
Элен чактарга корула,
Россияла бис јажына.

Ты солнцем создан, Алтай,
Живи и процветай.
Ты вовек непоколебим,
И прекрасен наш Алтай.

Алтай с Россией на века.
Тебе и ей мы верны.
И единою судьбой
Навсегда озарены!

Алтай!

Latin script

Kök teñeri cıldıstar,
Ulu, cayım Kan-Altay.
Üç-sümer, ıyık taygalar
Agaru, cebren Altay.

Üç tolıktu Kan-Altay
Cıñkıs eder cañı cok.
Ürgülci küygen odıbıs
Öçüp kalar uçurı cok.

Altay – öskön kabayıs,
Altay – möñkü kudayıs.
Elen çaktarga korula,
Rossiyala bis cajına.

Tı solntsem sozdan, Altay,
Jivi i protsvetay.
Tı vovek nepokolebim,
İ prekrasen naş Altay.

Altay s Rossiyey na veka.
Tebe i yey mı vernı.
İ yedinoyu sudboy
Navsegda ozarenı!

Altay!

IPA transcription (Note: See: Help:IPA and Altai language § Phonology; Help:IPA/Russian and Russian phonology; File:National Anthem of the Altai Republic.ogg.)

[køk teŋ.eˈri dʑɯɫ.dɯsˈtɑr |]
[uˈɫu dʑɑˈjɯm qɑn ɑɫˈtɑj ‖]
[ytɕ syˈmer ɯˈjɯq tɑj.ʁɑˈɫɑr |]
[ɑ.ʁɑru dʑebˈren ɑɫˈtɑj ‖]

[ytɕ to.ɫɯqtu qan ɑɫˈtɑj |]
[dʑɯɴˈqɯs eˈder dʑɑɴˈɯ dʑoq ‖]
[yr.ɣylˈdʑi kyjˈɣen o.dɯˈbɯs |]
[øˈtɕyp qɑɫɑr u.tɕuˈrɯ dʑoq ‖]

[ɑɫˈtɑj øsˈkøn qɑbɑ.jɯs |]
[ɑɫˈtɑj møŋˈky qudɑ.jɯs ‖]
[eˈlen tɕɑq.tɑrˈʁɑ qoˈru.ɫɑ |]
[rɐsˈsʲi.jɐ.ɫɐ bis dʑɑˈʑɯ.na ‖]

[tɨ ˈson.tsɛm ˈsoz.dɐn ɐɫˈtaj |]
[ʐɨˈvʲi i prɐts.vʲɛˈtaj ‖]
[tɨ vɐˈvʲɛk nʲɪ.pɐ.kɐ.lʲɪˈbʲim |]
[i prʲɪˈkra.sʲɪn naʂ ɐɫˈtaj ‖]

[ɐɫˈtaj s‿rɐˈsʲi.jɪj nɐ vʲɪˈka |]
[tʲɪˈbʲɛ i jɛj mɨ vʲɛrˈnɨ ‖]
[i jɛˈdʲi.nɐ.jʊ sʊdʲˈboj |]
[nɐf.sʲɪɡˈda ɐ.zɐ.rʲɪˈnɨ ‖]

[ɐɫˈtaj ‖]

English translation
Blue skies above full of stars,
So vast and free, Khan-Altai.
The three peaks of the calm taigas
This sacred, olden Altai.

Three lofty peaks Khan-Altai,
No traditions left behind.
Hawks sleep deep within the taigas,
No dogging taxes will drain us.

'Tis the birthplace of Altai,
One thousand lands of Altai.
Watching over her riches,
We'll too forever be Russians.

The sun hath forged thee, Altai,
So live and prosper on.
Preservering on and on,
And gorgeous is our Altai.

Altai with Russia for ages.
To thee and her we're loyal.
And with just one destiny
Perfused for eternity!

Altai!
