= Roman Ptitsyn =

Russian politician

- Роман Птицын
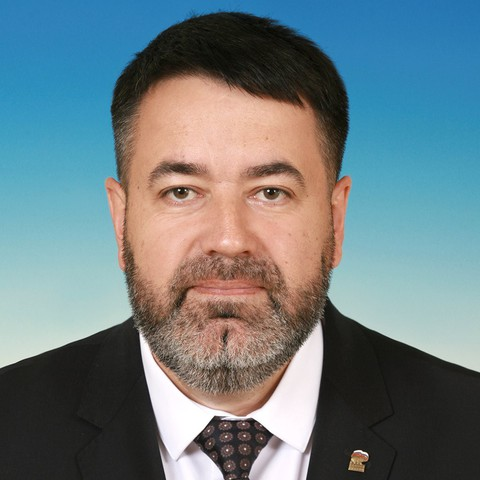
- Official portrait, 2021

Member of the State Duma
- In office 12 October 2021 – 30 September 2026
- Preceded by: Rodion Bukachakov
- Succeeded by: Alexander Surazov
- Constituency: Altai-at-large (No. 2)

Personal details
- Born: 8 September 1975 (age 51) Mayma, Gorno-Altai ASSR, Russian SFSR, Soviet Union
- Party: United Russia

Roman Viktorovich Ptitsyn (Russian: Роман Викторович Птицын; born 8 September 1975) is a Russian politician who served as a member of the State Duma.

== Political career ==
He was a United Russia candidate in the 2021 Russian legislative election. He was elected to the State Duma in the Altai constituency with 31.99 percent of the vote.

=== Sanctions ===
He was sanctioned by the UK government in 2022 in relation to the Russo-Ukrainian War. He also received sanctions from Canada, the United States, the European Union, Monaco, Switzerland and Australia.
