= Viktor Shvaiko =

Russian artist (born 1965)

Viktor Shvaiko (or Victor Shvaiko; born 1965) is a Russian artist whose work has been shown in various galleries across the world. He was born in Altai, Russia. He exhibited around Russia up until 1991 where he fled to Italy, through Yugoslavia during the confusion of the civil war there. His forte is in painting cafés from areas around Italy, France and the rest of Europe, with a great sense of lighting and shadows in his evening and morning paintings.

== Works ==
- Twilight at Troyes – May 1998
