= Semyon Zubakin =

Russian politician (born 1952)

- Семён Зубакин
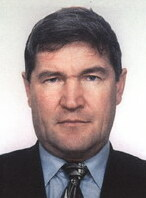
- Zubakin in 2008

3rd Head of the Altai Republic
- In office 13 January 1998 – 19 January 2002
- Preceded by: Vladilen Volkov
- Succeeded by: Mikhail Lapshin

Personal details
- Born: 4 May 1952 (age 73) Verkh-Uymon, Gorno-Altai Autonomous Oblast, Altai Krai, Russian SFSR, Soviet Union

Semyon Ivanovich Zubakin (Russian: Семён Иванович Зубакин; born 4 May 1952) is a Russian politician who was the 3rd Head of the Altai Republic in Russia from January 1998 to January 2002 serving one four-year term. In his unsuccessful reelection attempt in 2001, there were many candidates challenging him, and Zubakin received 15% of the vote in the first round, one of the worst showings for an incumbent candidate in world history, though he did take second place and proceeded to a runoff. He was defeated in a landslide by his opponent, Mikhail Lapshin and received only 23% of the vote.

Political offices
| Preceded by Vladilen Volkov | Head of the Altai Republic; 1998–2002 | Succeeded by Mikhail Lapshin |
