= Yury Lyashko =

Russian statesman (Born 1943)

- Юрий Ляшко
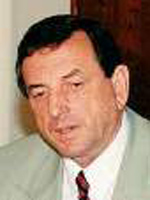

5th Governor of Amur Oblast
- In office 3 June 1996 – 20 April 1997
- Preceded by: Vladimir Dyachenko
- Succeeded by: Anatoliy Belanogov

1st Mayor of Blagoveshchensk
- In office 11 December 1991 – 3 June 1996
- Succeeded by: Aleksandr Kolyadin

Personal details
- Born: Yury Gavrillovich Lyashko; 22 April 1943 Vladivostok, Soviet Union
- Died: 7 March 2005 (aged 61) Moscow, Russia
- Party: Independent

Yury Gavrillovich Lyashko (Russian: Юрий Гаврилович Ляшко; 22 April 1943 – 7 March 2005), was a Russian statesman, who had served as the 5th governor of the Amur Oblast from 1996 to 1997. He also served as the 1st mayor of Blagoveshchensk from 1991 to 1996.

== Biography ==
Yury Lyashko was born in Vladivostok on 22 April 1943 to a military family. He began his career in 1960 as a carpenter in the construction department No. 2 of Glavvladivostokstroy.

In 1967, he graduated from the Far Eastern Polytechnic Institute.

He was a builder, and a specialist in industrial and civil construction.

He worked as chief engineer for construction of the Interdistrict Production Administration of Agriculture in Zey, Amur Oblast. He was deputy head of PMK-597 of the regional department of Amurselstroy. For ten years he worked in management positions. in the Tyndatrasstroy and TsentroBAMstroy trusts.

Since June 1985, he had been the Chairman of the Blagoveshchensk City Executive Committee of the Council of People's Deputies.

On 11 December 1991, Lyashko became the 1st mayor of Blagoveshchensk.

On 3 June 1996, Lyashko became the 5th governor of Amur Oblast. By that position, he was a member of the Federation Council and was a member of the Federation Council Committee on Agrarian Policy.

On 23 March 1997, he lost the election to Anatoly Belonogov.

After he left office, until September 1997, he became the representative of the President of Russia of the Amur Oblast.

From September 1997 to 1998, he was the Deputy Chairman of the State Committee of Russia for the Development of the North. The committee was then abolished due to the formation of the Ministry of Regional Policy.

From 1998 to 1999, Deputy Minister of National Policy of the Russia. In 1999, he was again appointed deputy chairman of the restored State Committee of Russia for the Development of the North, however, in 2000, he was relieved of this position due to the dissolution of the department. He was later was vice president of one of the Yukos divisions.

Lyashko had lived in Moscow where he died on 7 March 2015. He was buried at the Rakitki Cemetery (site 5).
