= Mikhail Lapshin =

Russian politician (1934–2006)

- Михаил Лапшин
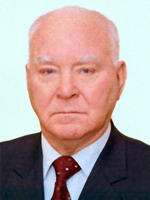
- Lapshin in 2006

4th Head of the Altai Republic
- In office 19 January 2002 – 26 January 2006
- Preceded by: Semyon Zubakin
- Succeeded by: Alexander Berdnikov

Personal details
- Born: Mikhail Ivanovich Lapshin; 1 September 1934 Setovka, Smolensky District, West Siberian Krai, Russian SFSR, Soviet Union
- Died: 17 June 2006 (aged 71) Dubnevo, Stupinsky District, Moscow Oblast, Russia
- Resting place: Troyekurovskoye Cemetery
- Party: Agrarian Party of Russia

Mikhail Ivanovich Lapshin (Russian: Михаил Иванович Лапшин; 1 September 1934 – 17 June 2006) was a Russian politician who had served as the 4th Head of the Altai Republic from 2002 to 2006.

== Biography ==
Lapshin was born in Setovka, in what is now Altai Krai. He was an ethnic Russian, but registered as ethnic Altai in the 2002 census when he was Head of the Altai Republic.

He was founder of the Agrarian Party of Russia and served as its leader between 1993 and 2004.

He became Head of the Altai Republic in January 2002. He defeated incumbent Semyon Zubakin in the December 2001 elections with 68% of the vote. In the first round of the elections, Lapshin and Zubakin were in a field of many candidates, and Lapshin received 23% of the vote. Lapshin survived an impeachment attempt in March 2005 by a vote of 22–14 in the state assembly. In December 2005, as his term was expiring, Lapshin was not renominated by President Vladimir Putin for another term, which was necessary for him to continue in office because of changes in the law. He was succeeded on 20 January 2006, by one of his 2001 election opponents, Alexander Berdnikov.

Lapshin died of thrombosis at his home in Dubnevo, in the Stupinsky District of Moscow Oblast, several months after leaving his post as president. He is interred at Troyekurovskoye Cemetery in Moscow.

Political offices
Preceded by Valentin Chernyavsky	Russian Federation Senator from Omsk Oblast; 8 February 2006 – 17 June 2006	Succeeded by Dmitri Alenichev
Preceded by Semyon Zubakin	Head of the Altai Republic; 2002–2006	Succeeded by Alexander Berdnikov
Party political offices
New political party	Chairman of the Agrarian Party of Russia; 1993–2004	Succeeded by Vladimir Plotnikov
