= Oleg Khorokhordin =

Russian politician (born 1972)

- Олег Хорохордин
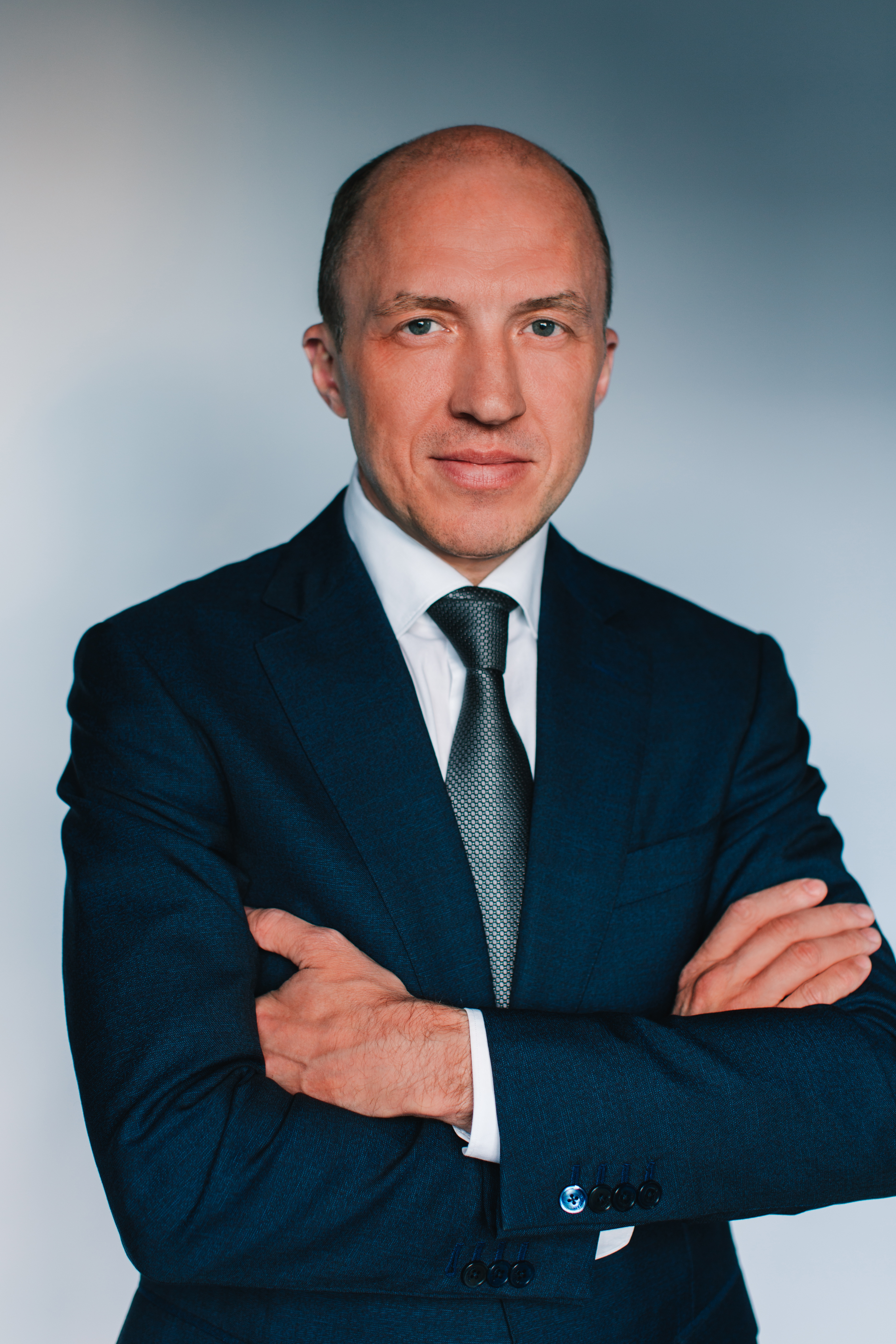
- Khorokhordin in 2019

6th Head of the Altai Republic
- In office 20 March 2019 – 4 June 2024
- Preceded by: Alexander Berdnikov
- Succeeded by: Andrey Turchak

Personal details
- Born: Oleg Leonidovich Khorokhordin; 3 April 1972 (age 53) Glushinka, Altai Krai, Russian SFSR, Soviet Union
- Political party: Independent
- Spouse: Svetlana Aleksandrovna (b. 1972)
- Children: Danila Olegovich Khorokhordin; Yaroslava Olegovna Khorkhordina

Oleg Leonidovich Khorokhordin (Russian: Олег Леонидович Хорохордин; born 3 April 1972), is a Russian politician who served as Head of the Altai Republic from 2019 to 2024.

== Early life and career ==
Oleg Khrokhordin was born in Glushinka in Altai Krai on 3 April 1972. From 1988 to 1989, he worked janitor in secondary school No. 106 of Barnaul, then clerk at the Leninsky District Court of Barnaul.

In 1989–1990 he was a repairman of the 2nd category at the Altai Engine Plant. From 1990 to 1992, he served in the Russian Army for urgent service in Ukraine. In 1993, after serving in the army, he worked for half a year as a carpenter-concreter of the 2nd category at the SU Barnaul thermal power station. He was transferred as a driver the same year. In 1994 he was transferred to PFC “Altaienergostroy” as a driver. In 1997, he was transferred to the position of Head of Section No. 2 “Trading House Altaienergostroy”. From 1997 to 2002 he became the director of Altai Energy Trading House.

== Education ==
In 1999, he studied Faculty of Economics at the Altai Academy of Economics and Law. In 2000, he became a student at the Department of State and Municipal Administration of the Altai Academy of Economics and Law.

In 2003, he full-time postgraduate study of the Department of Public Administration and personnel policy of the Russian Academy of Public Administration under the President of the Russian Federation, where he defended his thesis for the degree of candidate of sociological sciences on the subject “State and small business: interaction in the formation of personnel potential (sociological analysis)”.

Since 2012, he has been working in the council of the federal network operator in the field of navigation activities of GLONASS NP. In 2018, he worked in the second stream of preparation of the presidential personnel reserve on the basis of the Higher School of Public Administration of the RANEPA.

== Political career ==
On 20 March 2019, Khorkhordin was appointed Acting Head of the Republic of Altai by the Chairman of the Government of the Republic of Altai before taking office as a person elected Head of the Republic of Altai, Chairman of the Government of the Republic of Altai. He was elected as head of the republic on 8 September 2019.

Khorkhordin resigned as head of the republic on 4 June 2024, citing a "transition to a new workplace".

== Family ==
Oleg is married to Svetlana Aleksandrovna, a graduate of the Moscow State University. They have a son and daughter, Danila Khorkhordin, born in 1990, and Yaroslava Khorokordina, born in 1998. As of September 2013, Danila studied at the 2nd year of economics at the Moscow State University, while Yaroslava attended school in 5th grade.

== Personal life ==
He is fond of martial arts, alpine skiing, hunting in his spare time.

He does not have social networking accounts, and he uses the Internet only for work.
