= Shebalino, Altai Republic =

Village of the Altai Republic, Russia

Shebalino Шебалино
- Selo

Other transcription(s)
  - Altay: Шабалин
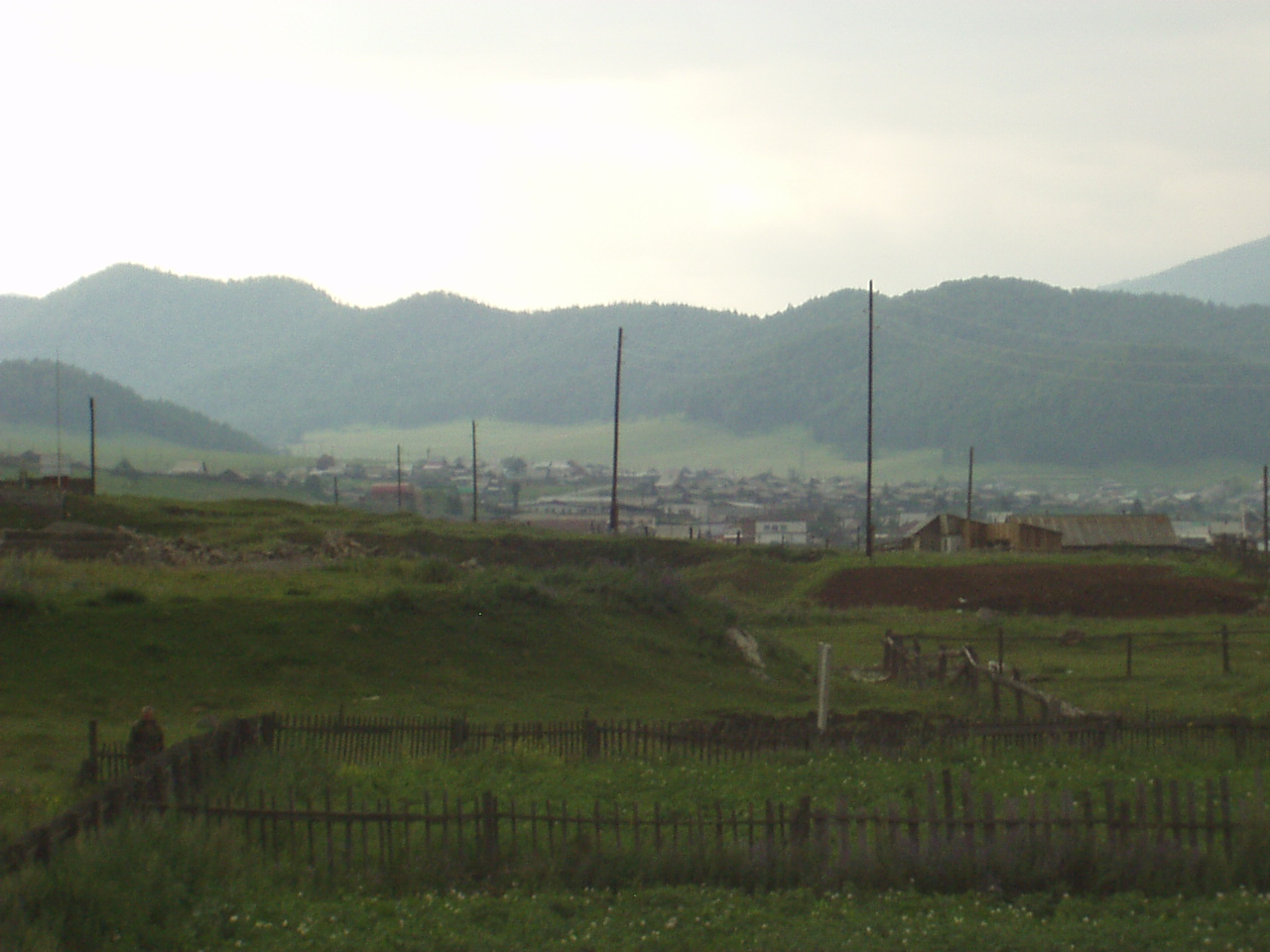

- Coat of arms
- Interactive map of Shebalino
- Location of Shebalino Shebalino (Altai Republic)
- Coordinates: 51°17′11″N 85°40′32″E
- Country: Russia
- Federal subject: Altai Republic
- Administrative district: Shebalinsky District
- SelsovietSelsoviet: Shebalinsky
- Founded: 1833
- Elevation: 861 m (2,825 ft)

Population (2010 Census)
  - Total: 4,924
  - Estimate (2016): 5,185 (+5.3%)

Administrative status
  - Capital of: Shebalinsky District, Shebalinsky Selsoviet

Municipal status
  - Municipal district: Shebalinsky Municipal District
  - Rural settlement: Shebalinskoye Rural Settlement
  - Capital of: Shebalinsky Municipal District, Shebalinskoye Rural Settlement
- Time zone: UTC+6 (MSK+3)
- Postal code: 649220
- OKTMO ID: 84650492101

Shebalino (Russian: Шебалино́, Altay: Шабалин, Şabalin) is a rural locality (a selo) and the administrative center of Shebalinsky District of the Altai Republic, Russia. Population: 4,924 (2010 census); 4,912 (2002 census); 4,974 (1989 Soviet census).
