= Gorno-Altaysk State University =

Coordinates: 51.96°N 85.9708°E

Gorno-Altaisk State University
- Established: 1949
- Rector: Vitaly Olegovich Nedelsky
- Students: >3,000
- Location: Gorno-Altaisk, Russia
- Website: https://www.gasu.ru/

Gorno-Altaisk State University is a Russian university founded in 1949 as the Gorno-Altaisk Teacher Training Institute. It is located in Gorno-Altaisk, Altai Republic. In 1993 it became a traditional degree-granting university. The university has over 3,000 students.

== Structure ==
There are seven faculties and a college at the university:

- Faculty of Natural Sciences and Geography
- Faculty of History and Philology
- Faculty of Psychology and Educational Sciences
- Faculty of Economics and Law
- Faculty of Altaic and Turkic Studies
- Faculty of Physics and Mathematics
- Faculty of Agricultural Technology
- Agricultural College
