= Vladilen Volkov =

Russian politician (born 1939)

- Владилен Волков
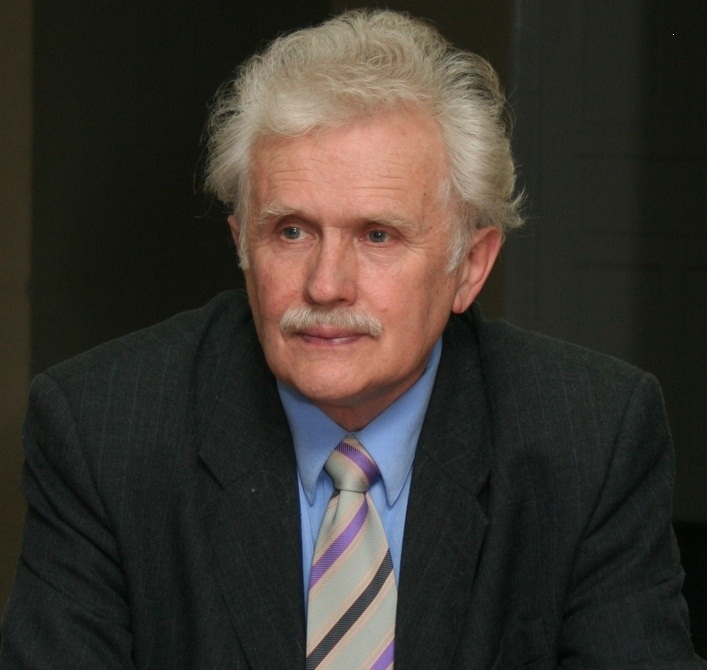
- Volkov in 2015

2nd Head of the Altai Republic
- In office 30 January 1997 – 13 January 1998
- Preceded by: Valery Chaptynov
- Succeeded by: Semyon Zubakin

Chairman of the State Assembly - El Kurultai of the Altai Republic
- In office 30 January 1997 – 30 August 1997
- Preceded by: Valery Chaptynov
- Succeeded by: Danil Tabayev

Chairman of the Government of the Altai Republic
- Preceded by: Valery Chaptynov
- Succeeded by: Semyon Zubakin

First Secretary of the Gorno-Altaysk City Committee of the CPSU
- In office June 1973 – September 1978
- Succeeded by: Viktor Ponosov

Personal details
- Born: Vladilen Vladimirovich Volkov; 7 July 1939 (age 86) Irkutsk, Russian SFSR, Soviet Union

Vladilen Vladimirovich Volkov (Russian: Владилен Владимирович Волков; born 7 July 1939) is a Russian politician who had served as the 2nd Head of the Altai Republic from 30 January 1997 to 13 January 1998.

In 1957, he graduated from secondary school No. 6 in Gorno-Altaysk. In 1960, he graduated from the Barnaul Construction College with a degree in technician-technologist. From February 1960 to September 1961, he was a concrete worker, foreman of a reinforced concrete products plant in the city of Barnaul.

From 1961 to 1964, he served in the GSVG. From November 1965 to February 1966 he worked as a foreman, shop manager of a reinforced concrete products plant in Gorno-Altaysk. From February 1966 to June 1973, he worked as an instructor, deputy head of a department of the regional committee of the CPSU, and from June 1973 to September 1978, Volkov was the first secretary of the Gorno-Altai city committee of the CPSU.

From September 1978 to July 1981, he studied at the graduate school of the Academy of Social Sciences under the Central Committee of the CPSU, received the title of candidate of historical sciences. From July 1981 to August 1984, he was the chairman of the Gorno-Altai Regional Council of Trade Unions. From 1982 to 1986, he was a Member of the Revision Commission of the All-Union Central Council of Trade Unions. From 1984 to 1990 he was secretary, second secretary, and first secretary of the Gorno-Altai Regional Committee of the CPSU. From October 1986 to July 1988, he was the Chief Counselor, Chairman of the Defense Council of Five Provinces, centered in Herat (Democratic Republic of Afghanistan). From May 1991 to February 1994, he was the chairman of the Republican Union of Afghan Veterans.

In 1993, Volkov was elected a deputy of the State Assembly of the Altai Republic. From February 1994 to January 1997, he was First Deputy Chairman of the State Assembly of the Altai Republic. On 30 January 1997, he was elected Chairman of the State Assembly, and became the 2nd Head of the Altai Republic. Since February 1997, he was a member of the Federation Council, Chairman of the Subcommittee on Science, Culture, Education, Healthcare and Environment.

From 2006 to 2016, Volkov was the chief of staff of the Public Chamber of the Altai Krai.
