= Shebalinsky District =

Shebalinsky District Шебалинский район (Russian)
- District

Other transcription(s)
  - Altay: Шабалин аймак
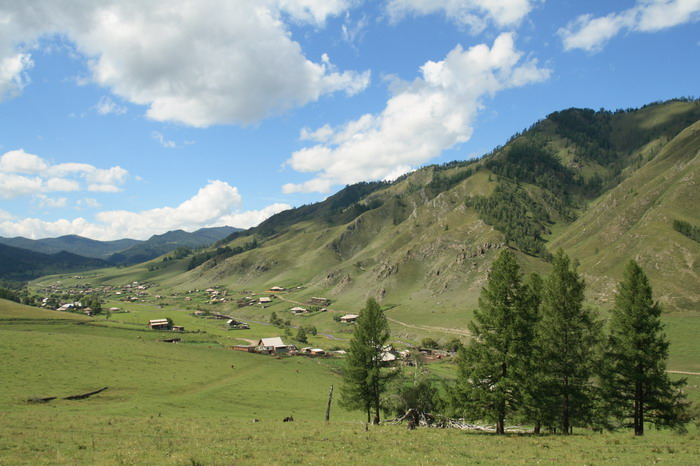
- The selo of Verkh-Apshuyakhta in Shebalinsky District

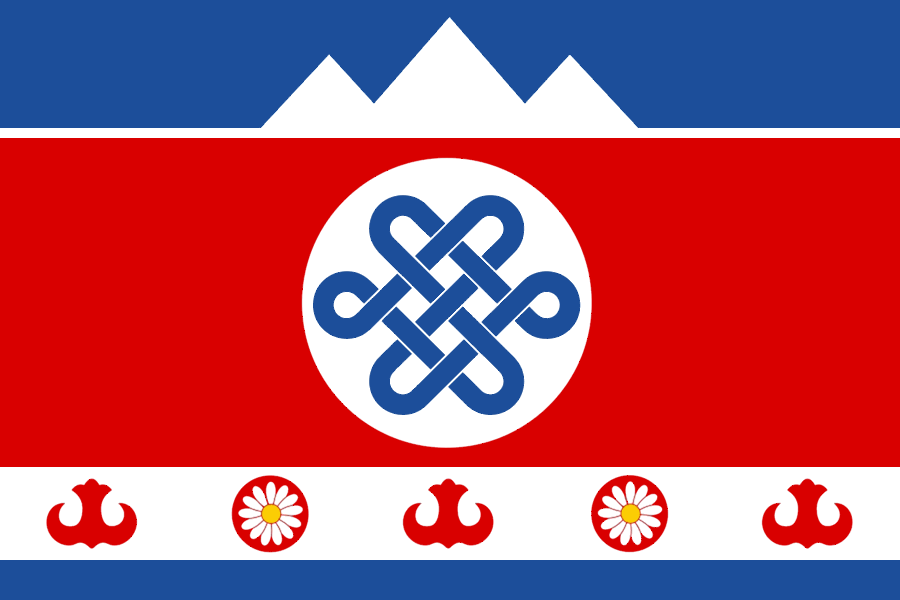
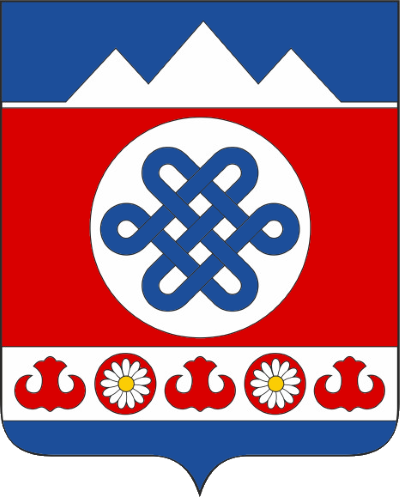
- Flag Coat of arms
- Location of Shebalinsky District in the Altai Republic
- Coordinates: 51°18′N 85°41′E
- Country: Russia
- Federal subject: Altai Republic
- Administrative center: Shebalino

Area
  - Total: 3,794 km^{2} (1,465 sq mi)

Population (2010 Census)
  - Total: 13,596
  - Density: 3.584/km^{2} (9.281/sq mi)
  - Urban: 0%
  - Rural: 100%

Administrative structure
  - Administrative divisions: 13 Rural settlements
  - Inhabited localities: 24 rural localities

Municipal structure
  - Municipally incorporated as: Shebalinsky Municipal District
  - Municipal divisions: 0 urban settlements, 13 rural settlements
- Time zone: UTC+6 (MSK+3)
- OKTMO ID: 84650000
- Website: http://www.shebalino-altai.ru

Population of Shebalinsky District
- 2010 Census: 13,596
- 2002 Census: 14,387
- 1989 Census: 23,202
- 1979 Census: 21,428

Shebalinsky District (Russian: Шебали́нский райо́н; Altay: Шабалин аймак, romanized: Şabalin aymak; Kazakh: Шибалы ауданы, Şibaly audany) is an administrative and municipal district (raion), one of the ten in the Altai Republic, Russia. It is located in the northwest of the republic. The area of the district is 3,794 square kilometers (1,465 sq mi). Its administrative center is the rural locality (a selo) of Shebalino. As of the 2010 Census, the total population of the district was 13,596, with the population of Shebalino accounting for 36.2% of that number.

== Administrative and municipal status ==
Within the framework of administrative divisions, Shebalinsky District is one of the ten in the Altai Republic. As a municipal division, the district is incorporated as Shebalinsky Municipal District. Both administrative and municipal districts are divided into the same thirteen rural settlements, comprising twenty-four rural localities. The selo of Shebalino serves as the administrative center of both the administrative and municipal district.

== Economy ==
Agricultural lands comprise 38.4% of the district's territory. Quarrying of marble is conducted in the district; some of the marble used during the building of the Moscow Metro came from here.
