= Gorno-Altai Autonomous Oblast =

Autonomous oblast of the Soviet Union (1922–1990)

- Autonomous oblast of the Soviet Union
- 1922–1990
- Location of the Gorno-Altai Autonomous Oblast within the RFSFR.
- Capital: Gorno-Altaysk
- Demonym: Gorno-Altaian
- History
  - Established: 1922
  - Proclaimed sovereignty: 25 October 1990
Preceded by	Succeeded by
Confederated Republic of Altai	Altai Republic

The Gorno-Altai Autonomous Oblast (Russian: Горно-Алтайская автономная область, romanized: Gorno-Altayskaya avtonomnaya oblast') was an autonomous oblast of the Soviet Union, inhabited by the Altai people. Formed as the Oyrot Autonomous Oblast (Russian: Ойротская Автономная область, romanized: Oyrotskaya Avtonomnaya oblast') on 1 June 1922, it was later renamed on 7 January 1948. It self-declared sovereignty as the Gorno-Altai Autonomous Soviet Socialist Republic (Gorno-Altai ASSR; Russian: Горно-Алтайская Автономная Советская Социалистическая Республика, romanized: Gorno-Altayskaya Avtonomnaya Sovetskaya Sotsialisticheskaya Respublika) on 25 October 1990, although not recognized at the time. It was promoted to a Soviet Socialist Republic on by an amendment to the Russian Constitution on 3 July 1991 and renamed to the Altai Republic on 31 March 1992, becoming a federal subject of the Russian Federation.

Its capital was Gorno-Altaysk. Agriculture was the main occupation for most of the inhabitants. Like the modern Altai Republic, the Gorno-Altai Autonomous Oblast shared its international border with the People's Republic of China.

A minor planet 2232 Altaj discovered in 1969 by Soviet astronomer B. A. Burnasheva is named after Altai.

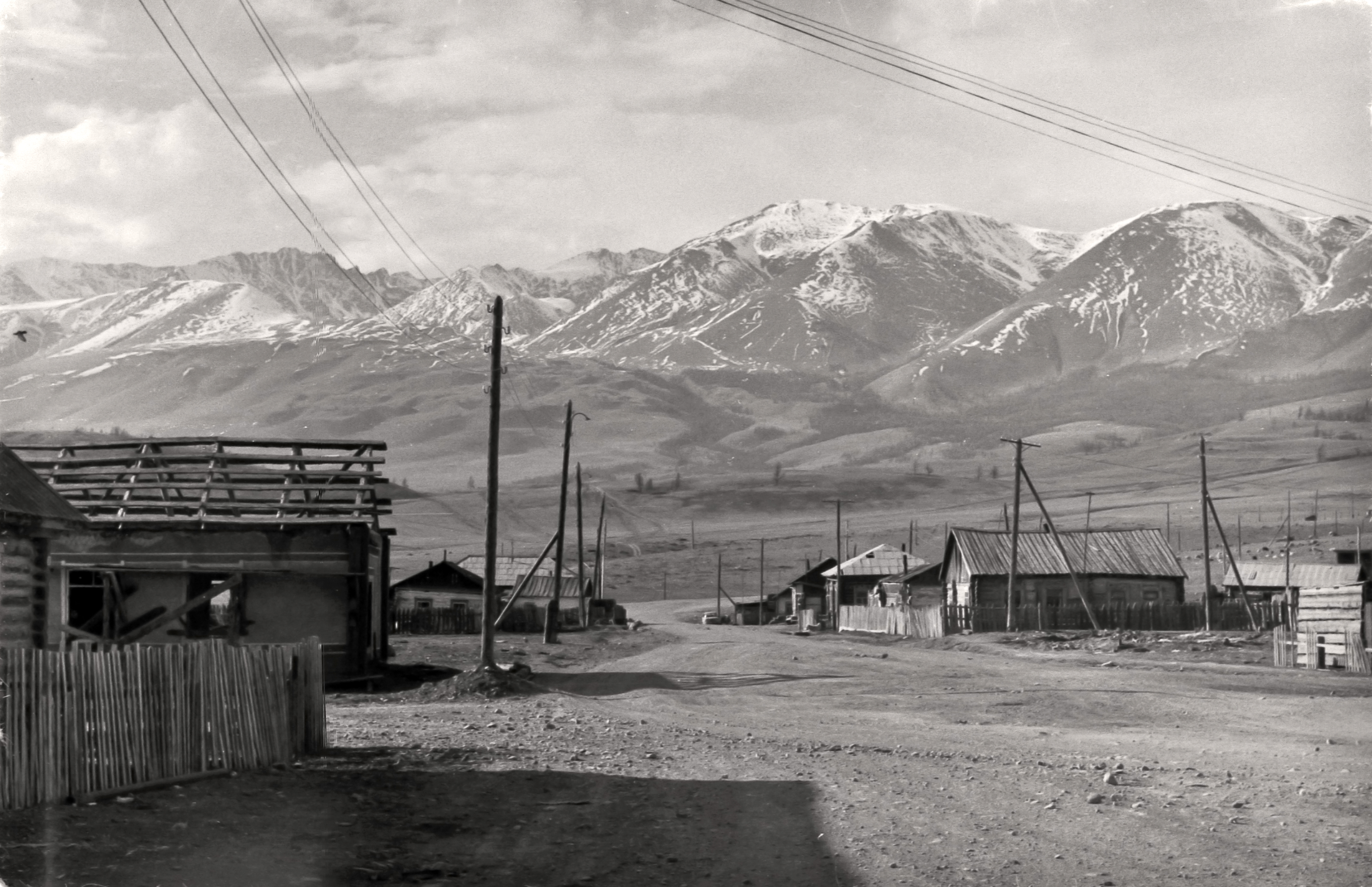
Scene in the Kosh-Agachsky District, Gorno-Altai AO, 1989

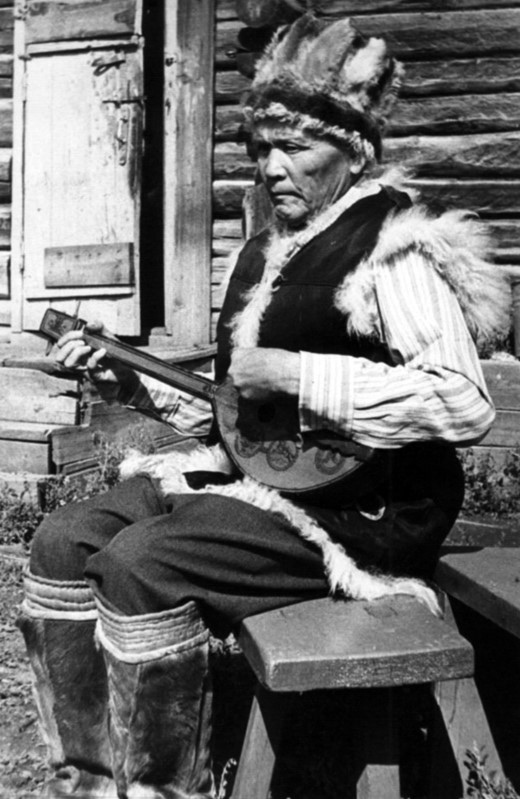
Musician Aleksey Grigoriy uly Kalkin in the Gorno-Altai AO, 1978

== History ==
When the region became the Oyrot Autonomous Region in 1922, the region's capital was originally called Ulala. In 1928 Ulala was renamed to Oyrot-Tura in 1932. However, in 1948 the state changed the name of the region to the Gorno-Altai Autonomous Oblast. With it, Ulala was again renamed, this time to Gorno-Altaysk.

== Education ==
The Gorno-Altaisk State University was founded in 1949, with only 10 teachers. In 1993 it became a classical university.

== Demographics ==
=== Ethnic groups ===
The 1989 census states that ethnic Russians make up 60.4% of Gorno-Altai's population, with the ethnic Altai people at 31.0%. Other groups include Kazakhs (5.6%) and several smaller groups, accounting for less than 5% of the population when put together. Comparing it to the 2002 census, the ethnic Altais have significantly increased in numbers.

	1989 census	2002 census
Altai people	59,130 (31.0%)	67,745 (33.5%)
Russians	115,188 (60.4%)	116,510 (57.4%)
Kazakhs	10,692 (5.6%)	12,108 (6.0%)
Other people	5,821 (3.1%)	6,443 (3.2%)

=== Religion ===
Some Altai people converted to Christianity, but in 1904 a new religion, Burkhanism (the "white faith"), had pervaded the community of native Altaians. Burkhanism helped to encourage anti-Russian feelings and was consequently banned by the Communist Party in the 1930s.

== Government ==
This table includes the heads in the time period of Gorno-Altai being an ASSR.

Position	Term length	Officeholder
First Secretary of the Gorno-Altai Communist Party	1990–1991	Valery Chaptynov
Chairman of the Presidium of the Supreme Soviet	1990–1991	Valery Chaptynov
Chairman of the Executive Committee	1990–1992	Vladimir Petrov

== See also ==
- Gorno–Altai Regional Committee of the Communist Party of the Soviet Union
