= State Assembly of the Altai Republic =

Regional parliament of the Altai Republic, Russia

State Assembly — El Kurultai of the Altai Republic Государственное Собрание — Эл Курултай Республики Алтай
- 8th legislature

Type
- Type: Unicameral

Leadership
- Chairman: Vladimir Tyuletin, United Russia

Structure
- Seats: 41
- Political groups: United Russia (37) CPRF (1); LDPR (2) SRZP (1)

Elections
- Last election: 8 September 2024
- Next election: 2029

Website
- elkurultay.ru

The State Assembly — El Kurultai of the Altai Republic (Russian: Государственное Собрание — Эл Курултай Республики Алтай, romanized: Gosudarstvennoye sobraniye — El Kurultay Respubliki Altay; Altay: Алтай Республиканыҥ Эл Курултай, romanized: Altay Respublikanıñ El Qurultay) is the regional parliament of the Altai Republic, a federal subject of Russia. A total of 41 deputies are elected for five-year terms.

== History ==
The origins of the national parliamentary system were laid in the history of the republic, when formed Mountain Duma and then Gorno-Altai Autonomous Oblast. State Assembly - EL Kurultai of the Altai Republic was established by the Supreme Council of the Republic of Altai of 14 October 1993 "On the reform of the representative bodies and local authorities in the Republic of Altai". This decree provided that "the supreme representative and legislative body of the Republic of Altai is the State Assembly - El Kurultai" of 27 deputies working on a permanent basis. Elections were held the same day as the elections to the State Duma of Russia. The powers of the Supreme Council stopped since the start of the new Parliament.

== Structure ==
The structure of the National Assembly is made up of the committees, the number of which can vary and the Bureau. Speaker of the Parliament shall be elected at the first organizational session on an alternative basis by secret ballot. Also elected by secret ballot by the committee chair. The list of committee members is determined by the desire of deputies to work in a particular committee.

In the first convocation of 1993–1997. during the elections of December 12, 1993, 27 deputies were elected. The first organizational session was held on February 1–3, 1994. Chairman of the Parliament of 1 February was elected VI Chaptynov. First Deputy Prime Minister - Vladimir Volkov. Vice-Presidents - DI Tabaev. There were also ten people elected to the Presidency of the Parliament.

== Elections ==
=== 2019 ===
Party	%	Seats
United Russia	34.18	25
Communist Party of the Russian Federation	29.50	7
Liberal Democratic Party of Russia	12.03	1
Rodina	5.38	1
A Just Russia	5.31	1
Party of Business	2.44	1
Self-nominated	—	5
Registered voters/turnout	49.87	

=== 2024 ===
Party	%	Seats
United Russia	53.84	37
Liberal Democratic Party of Russia	18.17	2
Communist Party of the Russian Federation	13.63	1
SRZP	5.70	1
New People	3.57	0
Rodina	1.65	0
Registered voters/turnout	45.61	

== See also ==
- List of Chairmen of the State Assembly of the Altai Republic
