= Altai Republic =

First-level administrative division of Russia

Altai Republic Алтай Республика (Altay) Республика Алтай (Russian)
- Republic
- Flag Coat of arms
- Anthem: National Anthem of the Altai Republic
- Coordinates: 50°51′N 86°54′E
- Country: Russia
- Federal district: Siberian
- Economic region: West Siberian
- Capital: Gorno-Altaysk

Government
  - Body: State Assembly—El Kurultai
  - Head: Andrey Turchak
  - Member of the State Duma: Roman Ptitsyn
  - Senators: Amyr Argamakov; Artur Kokhoyev

Area
  - Total: 92,903 km^{2} (35,870 sq mi)

Population (2021 Census)
  - Total: ▲210,924: 37.0% Altai; 53.7% Russians; 6.4% Kazakhs; 2.9% other
  - Rank: 81st
  - Density: 2.27/km^{2} (5.9/sq mi)
  - Urban: 31%
  - Rural: 69%

GDP (nominal, 2024)
  - Total: ₽108 billion (US$1.47 billion)
  - Per capita: ₽514,011 (US$6,979.1)
- Time zone: UTC+7 (MSK+4)
- ISO 3166 code: RU-AL
- Vehicle registration: 04
- OKTMO ID: 84000000
- Official language(s): Altai; Russian (official); Kazakh
- Website: www.altai-republic.ru

The Altai Republic, (Note: /ˈæltaɪ/; Altay: Алтай Республика, romanized: Altay Respublika; Russian: Респу́блика Алта́й, romanized: Respublika Altay, IPA: [rʲɪˈspublʲɪkə ɐlˈtaj].) also known as the Gorno-Altai Republic, (Note: Also colloquially, and primarily referred to in Russian to distinguish from the neighbouring Altai Krai as Gornyi Altai (Russian: Горный Алтай, romanized: Gornyy Altay, lit. 'the mountainous Altai').) is a republic of Russia located in southern Siberia. The republic borders Kemerovo Oblast to the north, Khakassia to the northeast, Tuva to the east, Altai Krai to the west, as well as three countries: Mongolia (Bayan-Ölgii) to the southeast, China (Xinjiang) to the south and Kazakhstan (East Kazakhstan Region) to the southwest. It is a part of the Siberian Federal District, and covers an area of 92,903 square kilometers (35,870 sq mi), with a population of 210,924 residents. It is the least-populous republic of Russia and least-populous federal subject in the Siberian Federal District. Gorno-Altaysk is the capital and the largest town of the republic with 65,342 inhabitants and in urban areas, making it the least urbanized federal subject.

The Altai Republic is one of Russia's ethnic republics, primarily representing the indigenous Altai people, a Turkic ethnic group that form 37% of the republic's population, while ethnic Russians form a majority at 54%. Other minority populations include Kazakhs, other Central Asian ethnicities, and Germans. The official languages of the Altai Republic are Russian and Altai. Kazakh is official in areas of compact settlement of its speakers.

== History ==
The Xiongnu Empire (209 BC – AD 93) governed the territory of the modern Altai Republic. The area was part of the First Turkic Khaganate, the Uyghur Empire, and the Yeniseian Kyrgyzs. It was during this time that the local population became fully Turkicized culturally and linguistically.

The southern part of the Altai Republic came under the Naiman Khanate. The territory of the modern Altai Republic has been ruled by the Mongolic Xianbei state (93–234), Rouran Khaganate (330–555), Mongol Empire (1206–1368), Golden Horde (1240–1502), Zunghar Khanate (1634–1758) and Qing Empire (1757–1864).

The Qing period is a semi-autonomous period with the supervision of two Altan Nuur Uriankhai Governor Banners and part of the seven Altai Uriankhai banners. During the Qing administration, the General of Siberia Fedor Ivanovich Soimonov launched a non-military expedition into the Altan Nuur region in 1760 and began fort building. This was subsequently removed by Heseri Jalafungga of the Qing. Since the 1820s, the routine border check was less frequent and the Chuy drainage basin has been occupied by Russians.

The entire Altan Nuur Uriankhai voluntarily became part of the Russian Empire in 1864-1865 by the Treaty of Tarbagatai. During the Russian Civil War, the Confederated Republic of Altai (Karakorum-Altai Region) was established in 1918, and declared as the first step to rebuilding Genghis Khan's Mongol Empire. But it never became a competing force in the Russian Civil War, and stayed neutral from 1918 until January 1920, when it was annexed back into Russia. A second Altai Republic was formed in 1921 and lasted until 1922 when they were annexed by the Bolsheviks.

On June 1, 1922, the Altaians regained autonomy with the creation of the Oyrot Autonomous Oblast (Ойро́тская автоно́мная о́бласть), part of Altai Krai. The original name for this region was Bazla. On January 7, 1948, it was renamed Gorno-Altai Autonomous Oblast (Го́рно-Алта́йская автоно́мная о́бласть). In 1991 it was reorganized into the Gorno-Altai Autonomous Soviet Socialist Republic (ASSR). In 1992 it was renamed as the Altai Republic.

== Geography ==
The Altai Republic is situated in the Altai Mountains in the very center of Asia at the junction of the Siberian taiga, the steppes of Kazakhstan and the semi-deserts of Mongolia. Forests cover about 25% of the republic's territory.

- Area: 92,600 km^{2} (35,800 sq mi)
- Borders:
  - internal: Kemerovo Oblast (N), Republic of Khakassia (NE), Tuva Republic (E), and Altai Krai (W/NW).
  - international: Mongolia (Bayan-Ölgii Province) (SE), China (Altay Prefecture, Xinjiang) (S), and Kazakhstan (East Kazakhstan Province) (S/SW)
- Highest point: Mount Belukha (4,506 m)
- Maximum N–S distance: 360 km
- Maximum E–W distance: 380 km

=== Rivers and lakes ===
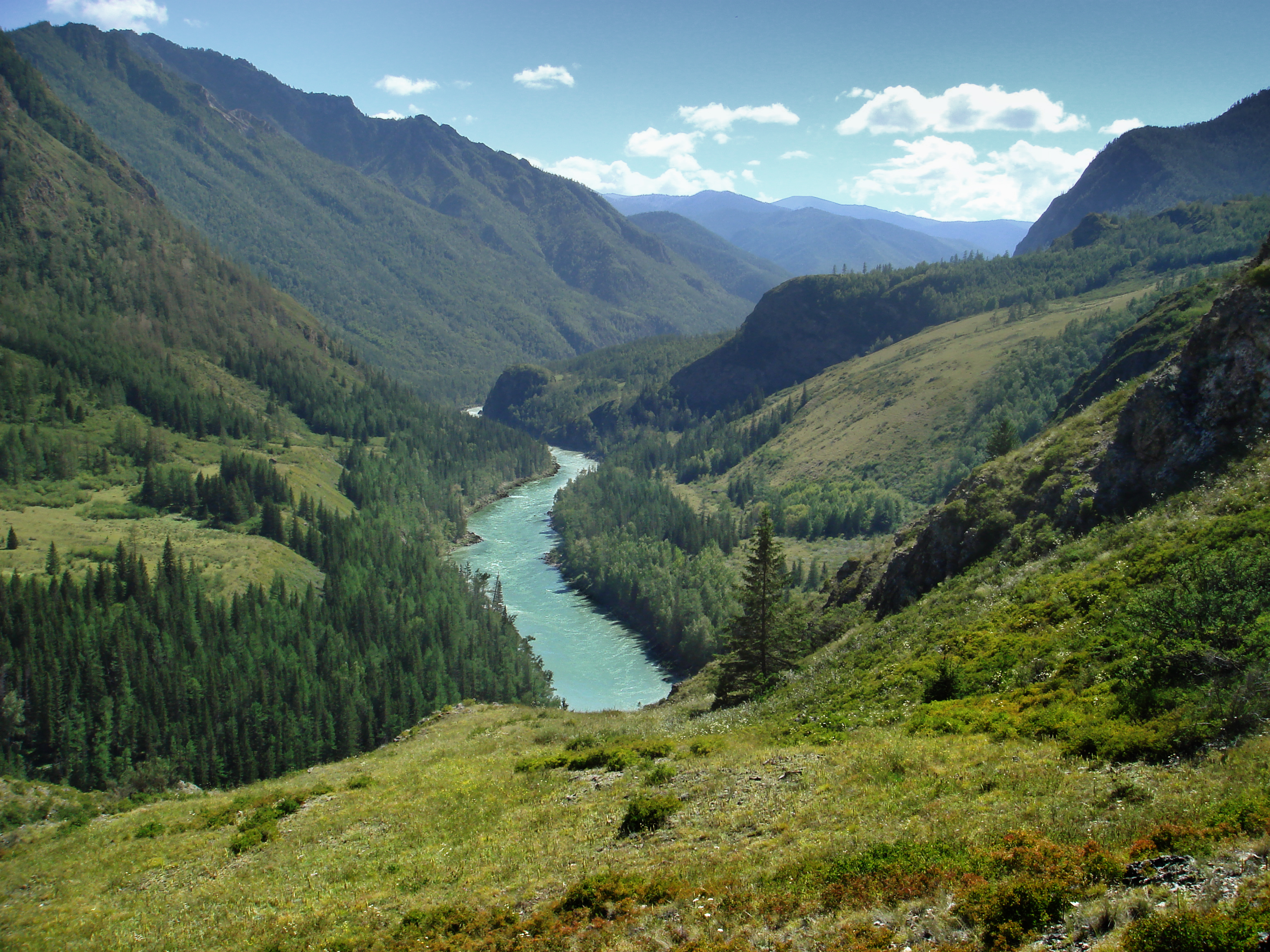
The Katun River in the Altai Republic

More than 20,000 tributaries sprawl throughout the mountainous Republic, making for a total of more than 60,000 kilometers (37,000 mi) worth of waterways. The republic's largest rivers are the Katun and the Biya, both of which originate in the mountains and flow northwards. The junction of the two rivers eventually forms the Ob River, one of the longest rivers in Siberia, which flows northward to the Arctic Ocean.

The source of the black Biya River is Lake Teletskoye, the region's largest lake located in an isolated area far south in the mountains. The emerald-colored Katun River has its source at the Gebler glacier, which is situated on the Republic's highest point, Mount Belukha. The Katun River, in particular, holds a religious significance for native Altaians, as well as for many Russians who live in the area, as Mount Belukha is known in Altai folklore to be the gateway to the mystical kingdom of Shambhala.

The hydrographic network of the Republic also includes approximately 7,000 lakes, adding up to a total area of more than 700 km^{2} (270 sq mi). The largest lake is Lake Teletskoye, which is 80 km (50 mi) long and 5 km (3.1 mi) wide, has an area of 230.8 square kilometers (89.1 sq mi), and has a maximum depth of 325 meters (1,066 ft). The mountain lakes of Altai contain enormous freshwater reserves of a very pure quality as a result of their distance from civilization. Lake Teletskoye alone contains more than 40 cubic kilometers (9.6 cu mi) of very clear water.

Potential groundwater storage is evaluated at 22 million cubic metres (780×10^{6} cu ft) per day, while the present use constitutes about 44,000 m^{3} (1,600,000 cu ft) per day.

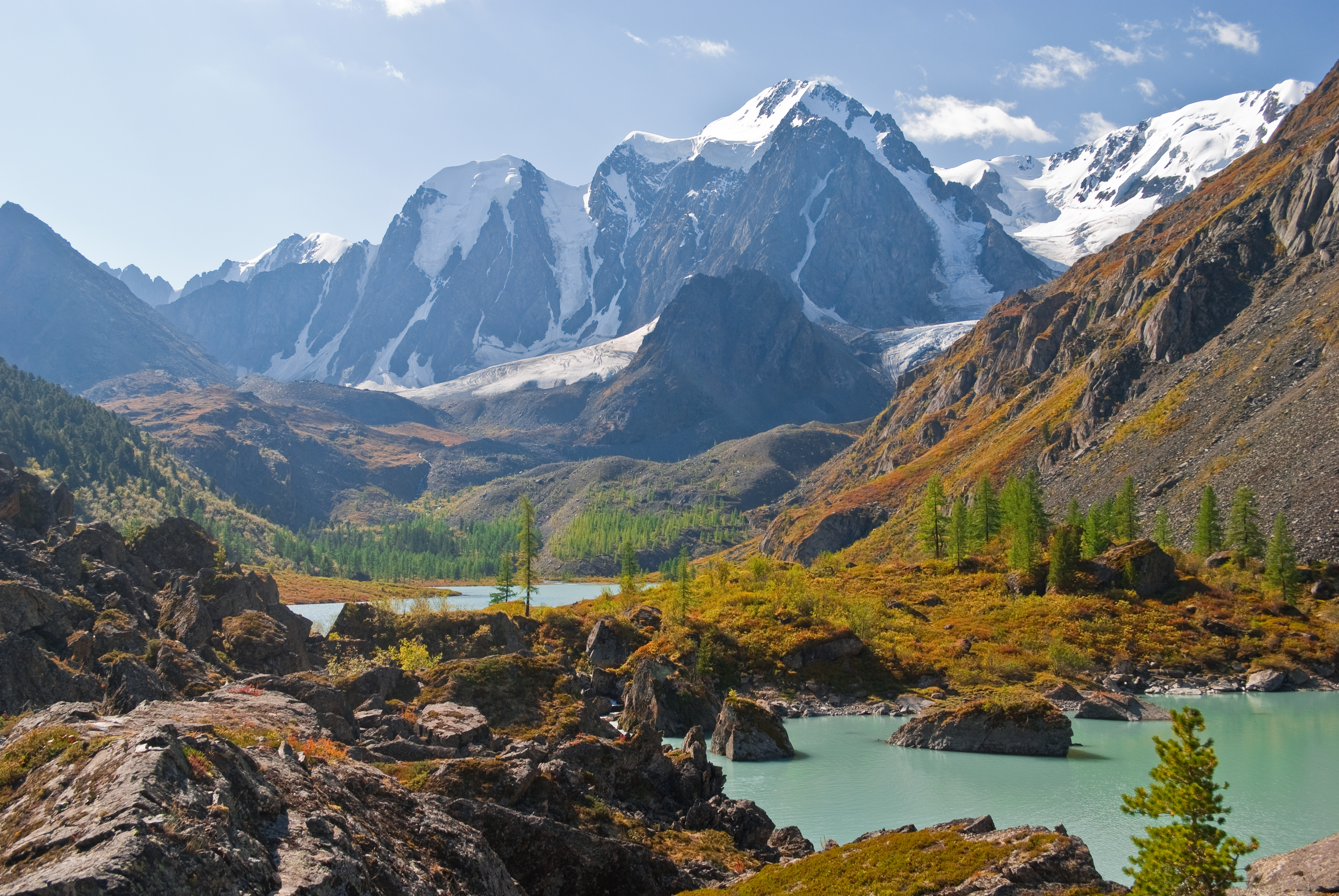
Shavlo Lake in Northern Chuysky Range

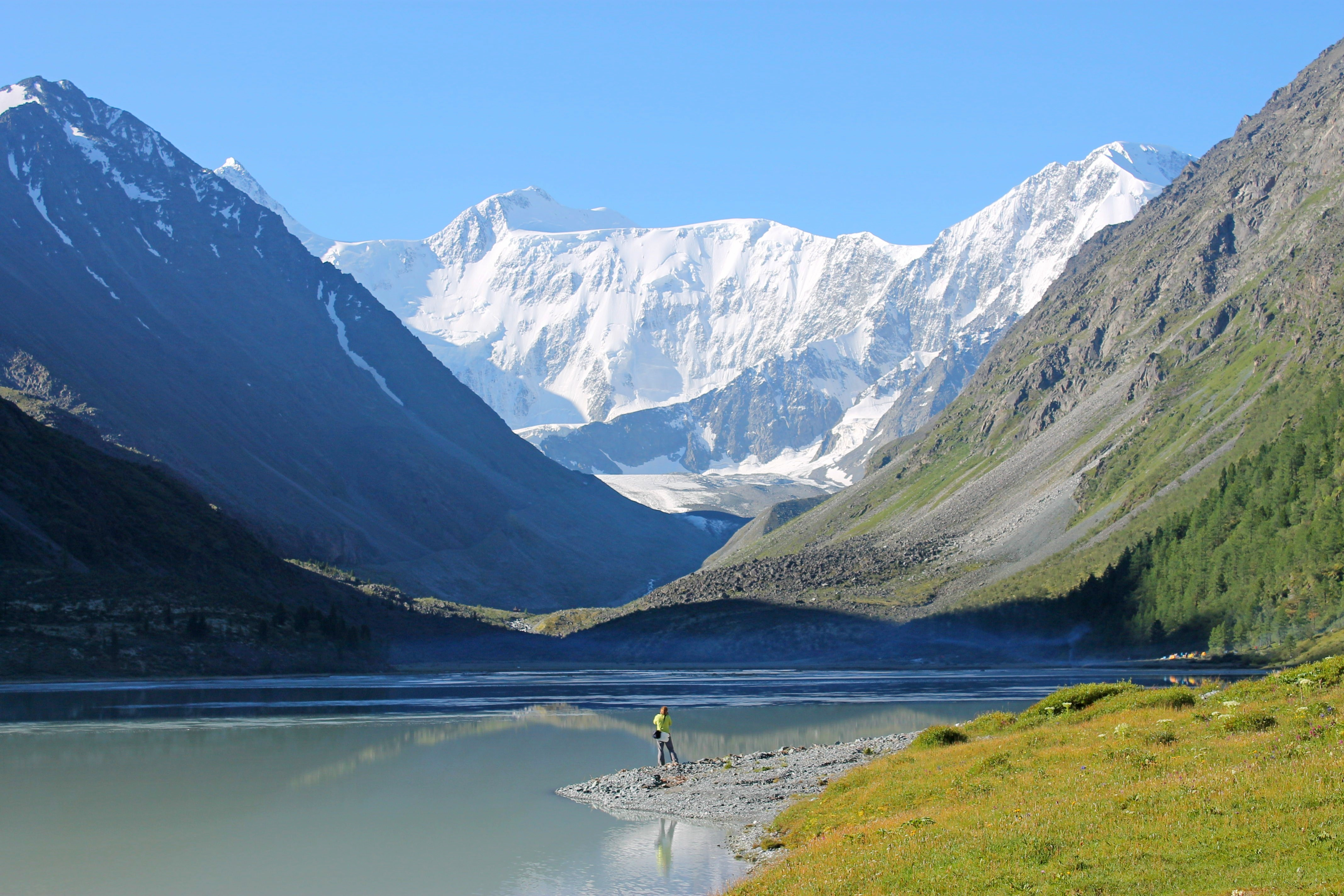
Belukha Mountain

=== Mountains ===
The most striking geographical aspect of the Republic of Altai is its mountainous terrain. The Republic is situated within the Russian part of the Altai Mountains system, which covers a large part of the Republic and continues into neighboring Kazakhstan, Mongolia and China. The region continues to experience periodic notable seismic activity, which is visually made apparent through the mountains' characteristically high and rugged mountain ridges, separated by narrow and deep river valleys. The Republic's highest peak, Mount Belukha (4,506 m), is the highest point in Siberia.

=== Natural resources ===
Various bodies of water are among the most important natural resources of the Republic. Mineral and hot springs are popular destinations for tourists and locals, sought for their therapeutic effects. Additionally, Altai glaciers contain a great amount of fresh water. The general volume of ice for registered Altai glaciers comes to a total of 57 km^{3}, 52 km^{3} of which is water. The total water stock of the glaciers exceeds the average annual effluence of all Altai rivers, which are equal to 43 km^{3} per year. The largest glaciers are Bolshoy Taldurinsky (35 km^{2}), Mensu (21 km^{2}), Sofiysky (17 km^{2}), and Bolshoy Maashey (16 km^{2}).

Mineral resources in the region primarily include gold, silver, iron ores, and lithium, in addition to other smaller amounts of minerals. The large city of Barnaul in neighboring Altai Krai was founded as a processing center for minerals from the Altai region, although the mineral extraction industry today is much smaller than in the past.

=== Climate ===
The republic has a temperate continental climate with relatively short and mild summers (June–August); and long, cold, and often quite frosty winters (November–March).

In general, the republic's climate of the southeastern areas, such as the (Ulagansky and Kosh-Agachsky Districts), is harsher than the climate of the less elevated northern areas.

- Average annual temperature: +1 °C to −6.7 °C.
- January temperature range: −9.2 °C to −31 °C.
- July temperature range: +11 °C to +19 °C.
- Average annual precipitation: 100–1000 mm.

== Administrative divisions ==
The Altai Republic is administratively divided into ten districts and Gorno-Altaysk Urban Okrug. The districts are further subdivided into ninety-two selsovets.

== Demographics ==
Population:
210,924 (2021 census); 206,168 (2010 census); 202,947 (2002 census); 191,649 (1989 Soviet census).

Historical population
Year	Pop.	±%
1897	41,983	—
1926	106,544	+153.8%
1939	162,179	+52.2%
1959	157,161	−3.1%
1970	168,261	+7.1%
1979	171,835	+2.1%
1989	191,649	+11.5%
2002	202,947	+5.9%
2010	206,168	+1.6%
2021	210,924	+2.3%
Source: Census data

=== Vital statistics ===
Source: Russian Federal State Statistics Service

	Average population (× 1000)	Live births	Deaths	Natural change	Crude birth rate (per 1000)	Crude death rate (per 1000)	Natural change (per 1000)	Fertility rates
1970	168	3,236	1,486	1,750	19.3	8.8	10.4	
1975	170	3,805	1,724	2,081	22.4	10.1	12.2	
1980	175	3,841	2,082	1,759	21.9	11.9	10.1	
1985	185	4,256	2,097	2,159	23.0	11.3	11.7	
1990	194	3,753	2,126	1,627	19.3	10.9	8.4	2,52
1991	196	3,579	2,064	1,515	18.2	10.5	7.7	2,41
1992	197	3,263	2,271	992	16.6	11.5	5.0	2,25
1993	197	2,878	2,630	248	14.6	13.4	1.3	2,00
1994	198	2,931	2,875	56	14.8	14.5	0.3	2,03
1995	199	2,853	2,637	216	14.3	13.2	1.1	1,93
1996	200	2,704	2,567	137	13.5	12.8	0.7	1,80
1997	200	2,686	2,547	139	13.4	12.7	0.7	1,77
1998	201	2,923	2,367	556	14.5	11.8	2.8	1,89
1999	202	2,742	2,536	206	13.6	12.6	1.0	1,74
2000	203	2,907	2,645	262	14.3	13.0	1.3	1,82
2001	203	3,033	2,870	163	14.9	14.1	0.8	1,87
2002	203	3,252	3,061	191	16.0	15.1	0.9	1,98
2003	203	3,392	3,173	219	16.7	15.7	1.1	2,04
2004	202	3,513	3,015	498	17.4	14.9	2.5	2,08
2005	202	3,502	3,170	332	17.3	15.7	1.6	2,03
2006	202	3,395	2,837	558	16.8	14.1	2.8	1,93
2007	202	4,066	2,574	1,492	20.1	12.7	7.4	2,29
2008	203	4,442	2,549	1,893	21.9	12.5	9.3	2,48
2009	204	4,266	2,492	1,774	20.9	12.2	8.7	2,48
2010	206	4,224	2,508	1,716	20.6	12.2	8.3	2,48
2011	207	4,719	2,529	2,190	22.7	12.2	10.5	2,84
2012	209	4,693	2,416	2,277	22.4	11.5	10.9	2,91
2013	211	4,442	2,392	2,027	21.1	11.3	9.8	2,82
2014	213	4,404	2,365	2,039	20.7	11.1	9.6	2,88
2015	214	4,022	2,347	1,675	18.7	10.9	7.8	2,68
2016	216	3,911	2,151	1,760	18.1	10.0	8.1	2,63(e)
2017	217	3,443	2,099	1,344	15.8	9.6	6.2	

=== Ethnic groups ===
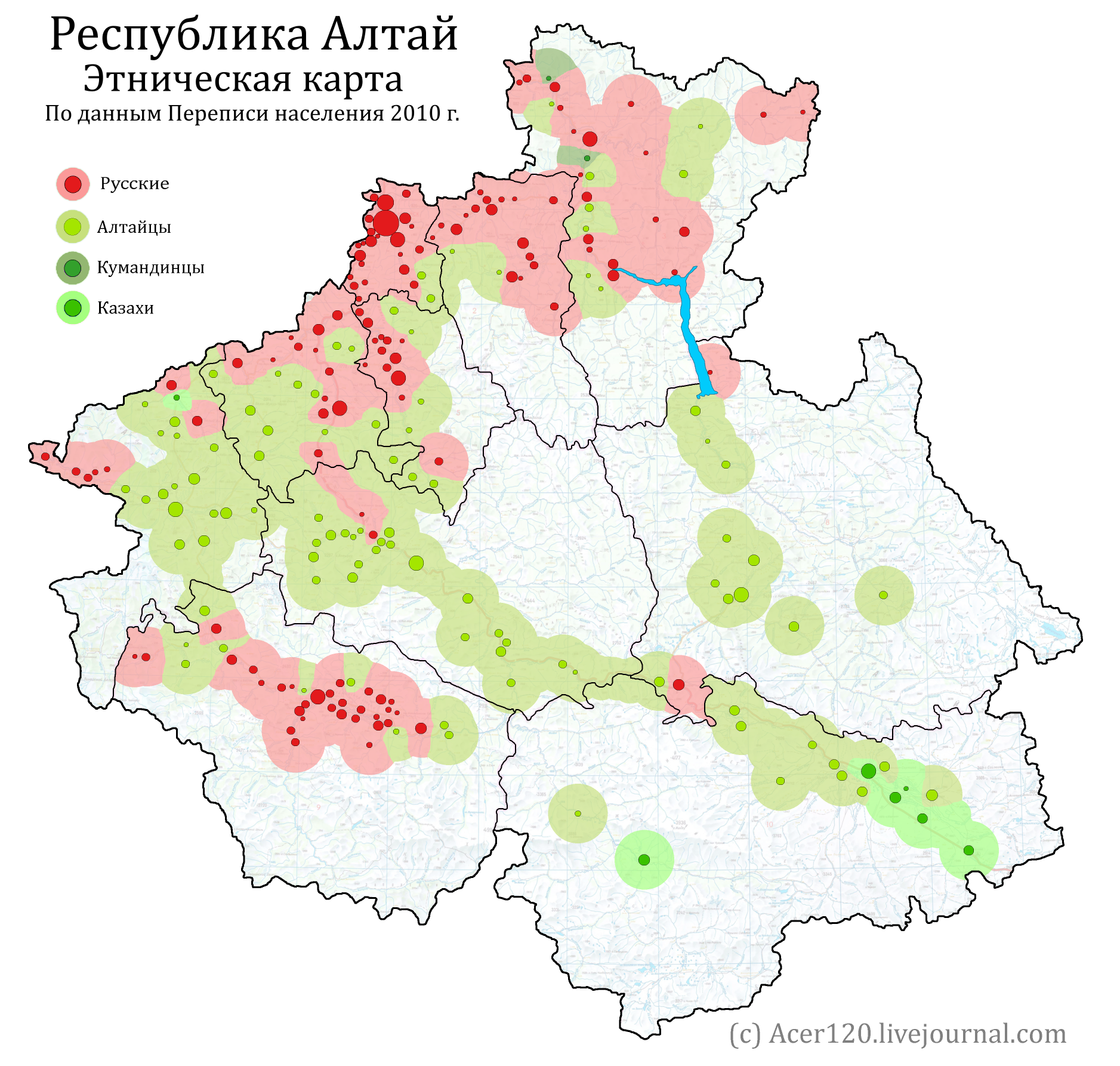
Ethnic map of the Altai Republic by settlements, 2010 census. Russians Altaians Kumandins Kazakhs

As per the 2021 Census, ethnic Russians make up 53.7% of the republic's population, with the indigenous Altai people making up 37.0%. Other groups include people of Kazakh (6.4%), together with smaller groups, each accounting for less than 0.5% of the total population.

Ethnic group	1926 Census		1939 Census		1959 Census		1970 Census		1979 Census		1989 Census		2002 Census		2010 Census		2021 Census	
Ethnic group	Number	%	Number	%	Number	%	Number	%	Number	%	Number	%	Number	%	Number	%	Number	%
Altai	42,213^{1}	42.4%	39,285	24.2%	38,019	24.2%	46,750	27.8%	50,203	29.2%	59,130	31.0%	68,027^{2}	33.6%	69,963^{3}	34.5%	73,242	37.0%
Russians	51,813	52.0%	114,209	70.4%	109,661	69.8%	110,442	65.6%	108,795	63.2%	115,188	60.4%	116,510	57.5%	114,802	56.6%	106,258	53.7%
Kazakhs	2,326	2.3%	4,280	2.6%	4,745	3.0%	7,170	4.3%	8,677	5.0%	10,692	5.6%	12,108	6.0%	12,524	6.2%	12,647	6.4%
Others	3,309	3.3%	4,405	2.7%	4,736	3.0%	3,899	2.3%	4,365	2.5%	5,821	3.1%	5,914	2.9%	5,447	2.7%	5,741	2.9%

1. including 3,414 Telengits, 1,384 Kumandins and 344 Teleuts
2. including 2,368 Telengits, 1,533 Tubalars, 931 Kumandins, 830 Chelkans, 141 Shors and 32 Teleuts
3. including 3,648 Telengits, 1,891 Tubalars, 1,062 Kumandins, 1,113 Chelkans and 87 Shors
4. including 2,587 Telengits, 3,424 Tubalars, 1,037 Kumandins, 1,170 Chelkans and 91 Shors
5. 3,432 people were registered from administrative databases, and could not declare an ethnicity. It is estimated that the proportion of ethnicities in this group is the same as that of the declared group.

== Politics ==
The head of government in the Altai Republic is the Head of the Republic, popularly elected for a four-year term. As of 2024, the current Head of the Republic is Andrey Turchak, who succeeded Oleg Khorokhordin in this post. The supreme legislative body of the republic is the State Assembly—El Kurultai, with 41 deputies popularly elected every four years. Igor Yaimov is the current Chairman of the State Assembly-El Kurultai from January 2002.

The Republic's Constitution was adopted on June 7, 1997.

== Economy ==
The Altai Republic is a highly agricultural region. However, it does have some industry which includes foodstuffs, non-ferrous metallurgy, chemicals, gold mining, footwear, dairying, and timber. Tourism has also begun to be a large part of the economy, and a significant number of new hotels and resorts have appeared.

=== Mining ===
- Alakhinskoye mine (lithium reserve)

=== Transportation ===
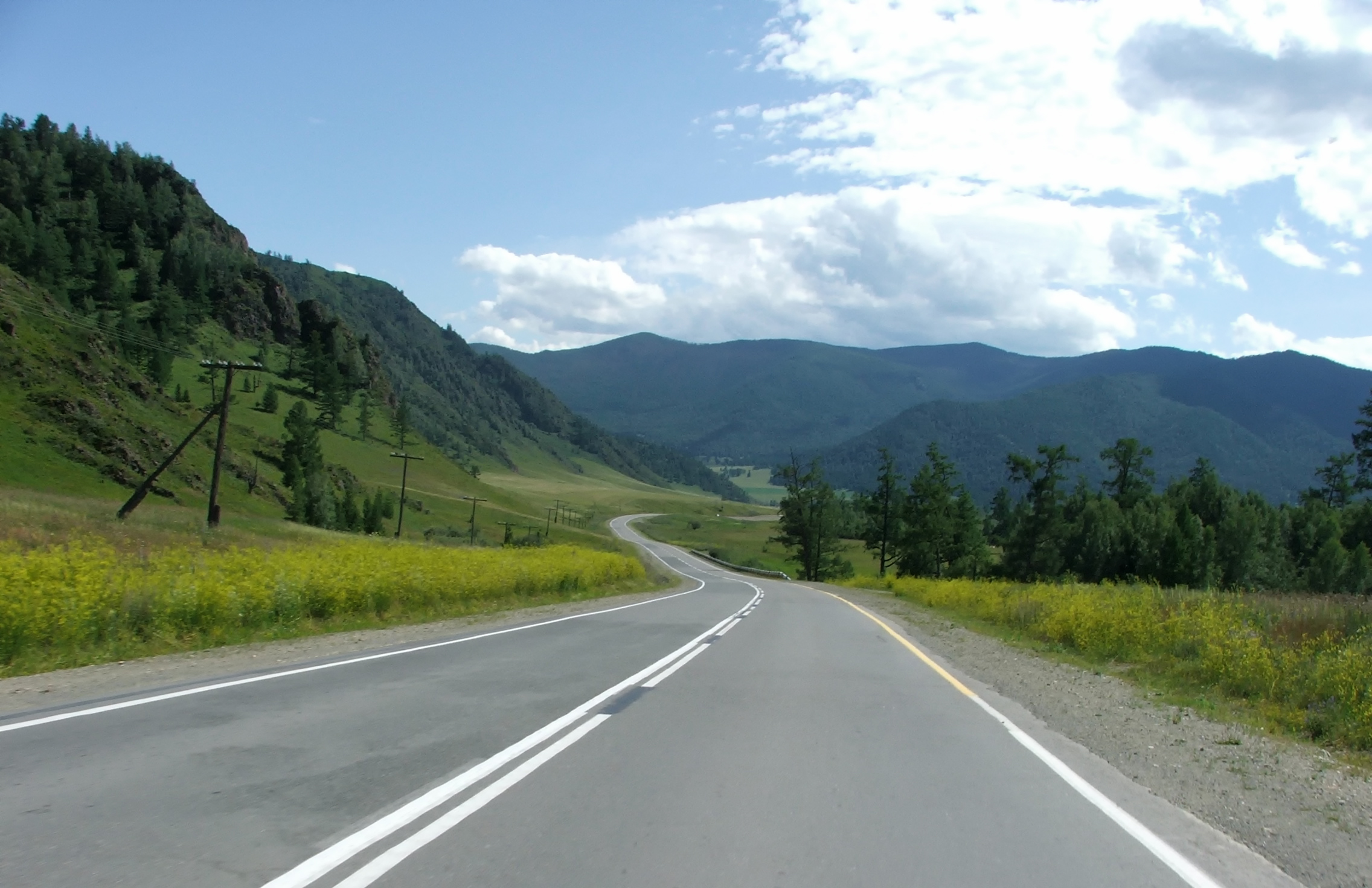
Seminsky Pass of the Chuysky Trakt

The Altai Republic is one of the few Russian political divisions without rail access. The main paved road is the Chuysky Tract, which spans the republic from the capital Gorno-Altaisk in the north to the Mongolian border in the south. The republic's main paved road threads its way through the rugged Altai Mountains. A system of taxis and buses transports people between settlements. Within the settlements, people generally walk or ride horses.

Helicopters are used for emergency transportation, to supply remote government outposts, and by wealthy tourists. In 2012, runway capacity at the Gorno-Altaysk Airport near the republic's capital, was doubled. In June that same year, S7 Airlines started direct flights from Moscow. Prior to this, passengers used to fly through Barnaul in Altai Krai or Novosibirsk.

=== Tourism ===
A Voice of America reporter tours the Altai region in 2012.

With the dissolution of the Soviet Union, the Altai Republic's tourism industry has greatly expanded. Although wealthy Russians from neighboring Russian regions are the most common sort of tourist in Altai, foreign interest has also grown in the area, especially due to the area's spiritual significance.

Popular tourist destinations tend to be concentrated in the north, where the roads are more accessible. They are also almost entirely located along the Chuiskiy highway, which is the main road from the north into the mountains, although it is currently (2006) only two lanes wide. The north is also significantly warmer than the elevated southern areas, which tend to be chilly even in the summer.

Some of the more well-known tourist spots in the Altai Republic include Lake Aiya, a popular bathing spot, and the picturesque Chemal region. Other travelers sometimes visit the more remote Lake Teletskoye or Mount Belukha in the south.

== Education ==
There is one university (Gorno-Altaysk State University), 12 colleges, and 205 secondary schools in the republic.

== Religion ==
Religion in Altai Republic as of 2012 (Sreda Arena Atlas)
Russian Orthodoxy	27.6%
Old Believers	1.2%
Protestantism	1%
Other Christians	3%
Islam	6.2%
Hinduism	2%
Tengrism and other native faiths	13%
Spiritual but not religious	24.6%
Atheism and irreligion	14.4%
Other and undeclared	7.4%

Different religions are present in Altai. According to a 2012 survey, 27.6% of the population adheres to the Russian Orthodox Church. The second most popular religions are ethnic and nature religions, namely Rodnovery (Slavic native faith), Tengrism (Central Asians' native faith) and Burkhanism, constituting altogether 13% of the population. 6% of the population follows Islam, 2% Hinduism (including Slavic-Vedic, Krishnaite, and Tantric movements), 1% are Old Believers and 1% Protestants. 25% of the population is "spiritual but not religious", 14% is atheist and 7.4% follows other religions or did not answer the question.

The traditional religion of the native Altaians is Tengrist shamanism, revived by modern Tengrist movements and Burkhanism. Ethnic Russians primarily practice Russian Orthodox Christianity and Rodnovery (Slavic native faith), while Kazakhs are traditionally Muslims. Tibetan Buddhism has also recently begun making some inroads by way of neighboring Mongolia and Tuva.

It is unknown when Buddhism came into Altai but in various periods of history, the territory of the Altai and its population found themselves in full or partial subjection to neighboring states, where Buddhism was the official or one of the official religions: the state of the Khitans (tenth-twelfth centuries), the Mongol Empire (thirteenth-fourteenth centuries), and the Dzhungar Khanate (seventeenth-eighteenth centuries).

From 1904 until the 1930s, a new religious movement called Burkhanism (or Ak Jang, the "white faith") was popularized among native Altaians. The religion originated in Altai and emphasized the "white" aspect of shamanistic practice. Burkhanism remains an important component of Altai national consciousness and is currently being revived in several forms along with indigenous Altai culture in general.

Russian Pagan followers often go on pilgrimages to Mount Belukha, which is considered to be the location of Shambhala both by some Pagans and locals of Altai. One can often find manifestations of shamanistic spirituality in the region; for example, at points along the Katun River, local believers in shamanic religions are known to tie white ribbons to nearby trees and leave offerings of coins or food to the spirits. Although shamanism is much less widely practiced today, it is regaining popularity as a result of new religious freedom following the collapse of the Soviet Union.

== Culture ==
The indigenous Altai culture holds the lands of Altai to be sacred. The indigenous (Turkic) languages are focused on the stewardship of the lands. The Altai oral history is transmitted by throat-singers. The Altai culture was repressed during Soviet times and has been rebounding since then. The clans of all ten regions gather in the village of Yelo for a biennial cultural celebration.

There is also a large contingent of "Old Believers" who fled to Altai when they split from the Russian Orthodox Church over 300 years ago.

The UNESCO World Heritage Site "Golden Mountains" protects the Ukok Plateau, on which there are many standing stones and kurgans. Although archaeologists consider kurgans to be burial sites, the indigenous people believe that they are highly refined magnetic instruments for directing the flow of cosmic energy into the Earth. Thus, there is great local indignation about the excavation and removal of the Siberian Ice Maiden, an extraordinary 2,500-year-old mummy that had been preserved in permafrost.

Gorno-Altaisk is the location of the National Museum of the Altai Republic, which houses the mummy, the "Altai Princess", the National Library of the Republic of Altai, the National Theatre of the Republic of Altai and the Municipal House of Culture.

Regularly held national holiday Maslenitsa, Nowruz, Chaga – Bayram, received in February 2013 with the official status of the Republican celebration.

In 2013, the Altai Republic participated in the Turkvision Song Contest. The Altai Republic's entry was the song "Altayym Menin" performed by Artur Marlujokov. The Altai Republic placed fifth in the contest.

== Sport ==
Bandy is played in the Altai Republic.

== Notable people ==
- Alexander Berdnikov (born April 8, 1953), Chairman of the Government of the Altai Republic, and the head of the republic from January 20, 2006
- Grigory Gurkin (January 24, 1870 – October 11, 1937), landscape painter
- Mikhail Lapshin (September 1, 1934 – June 17, 2006), President of the Altai Republic from January 19, 2002, to January 19, 2006
- Sergey Ochurdyapov (born February 24, 1974), Honored Worker of Culture of the Altai Republic. Head of the Inspectorate for State Protection of Cultural Heritage Objects of the Altai Republic since September 13, 2017. Head of the House of Ak-Kebek
- Aruna Arna (born 30 March 1986), leader of the protest movement in Altai Republic.
- Sergey Mikayelyan (born April 27, 1992), cross-country skier
- Viktor Shvaiko (b. 1965), painter
- Semyon Zubakin (born May 4, 1952), Head of the Altai Republic, in Russia, from January 13, 1998, to January 19, 2002

== See also ==
- Music of Altai
- Altai-Sayan region
- Islam in the Altai Republic
