= List of rural localities in the Altai Republic =

Map of Russia with the Altai Republic highlighted

This is a list of rural localities in the Altai Republic. The Altai Republic (/ˈæltaɪ/; Russian: Респу́блика Алта́й, romanized: Respúblika Altáj, pronounced [rʲɪˈspublʲɪkə ɐlˈtaj]; Altai: Алтай Республика, Altay Respublika) is a federal subject of Russia (a republic). Its capital is the town of Gorno-Altaysk. The area of the republic is 92,600 square kilometers (35,800 sq mi), and its population is 206,168 (2010 Census).

== Chemalsky District ==
Rural localities in Chemalsky District:

- Anos
- Askat
- Ayula
- Beshpeltir
- Chemal
- Cheposh
- Edigan
- Elanda
- Elekmonar
- Karakol
- Kuyus
- Nizhny Kuyum
- Oroktoy
- Tolgoyek
- Turbaza "Katun"
- Uozhan
- Ust-Sema
- Uznezya
- Verkh-Anos

== Choysky District ==
Rural localities in Choysky District:

- Choya
- Gusevka
- Ishinsk
- Karakoksha
- Kiska
- Krasnoselsk
- Kuzya
- Levinka
- Paspaul
- Salganda
- Seyka
- Sovetskoye
- Sugul
- Sukhoy Karasuk
- Tunzha
- Uskuch
- Uymen
- Ynyrga

== Kosh-Agachsky District ==
Rural localities in Kosh-Agachsky District:

- Aktal
- Arkyt
- Beltir
- Belyashi
- Chagan-Uzun
- Kokorya
- Kosh-Agach
- Kuray
- Kyzyl-Tash
- Mukhor-Tarkhata
- Novy Beltir
- Ortolyk
- Tashanta
- Telengit-Sortogoy
- Tobeler
- Zhana-Aul

== Mayminsky District ==
Rural localities in Mayminsky District:

- Aleksandrovka
- Alfyorovo
- Barangol
- Biryulya
- Cheremshanka
- Dubrovka
- Filial
- Izvestkovy
- Karasuk
- Karlushka
- Karym
- Kyzyl-Ozyok
- Manzherok
- Mayma
- Ozernoye
- Podgornoye
- Rybalka
- Souzga
- Sredny Saydys
- Turbaza "Yunost"
- Ulalushka
- Urlu-Aspak
- Ust-Muny
- Verkh-Karaguzh
- Verkhny Saydys

== Ongudaysky District ==
Rural localities in Ongudaysky District:

- Akbom
- Barkhatovo
- Bichiktu-Boom
- Bolshoy Yaloman
- Boochi
- Inegen
- Inya
- Iodro
- Kara Koby
- Karakol
- Kayarlyk
- Khabarovka
- Kulada
- Kupchegen
- Kurota
- Malaya Inya
- Maly Yaloman
- Neftebaza
- Nizhnyaya Talda
- Onguday
- Ozyornoye
- Shashikman
- Shiba
- Talda
- Tenga
- Tuyekta
- Ulita
- Yelo

== Shebalinsky District ==
Rural localities in Shebalinsky District:

- Aktel
- Arbayta
- Baragash
- Barlak
- Besh-Ozyok
- Cherga
- Dyektiyek
- Ilyinka
- Kamay
- Kamlak
- Kaspa
- Kukuya
- Kumalyr
- Malaya Cherga
- Mariinsk
- Moguta
- Mukhor-Cherga
- Myuta
- Shebalino
- Shirgaytu
- Topuchaya
- Uluscherga
- Verkh-Apshuyakhta
- Verkh-Cherga

== Turochaksky District ==
Rural localities in Turochaksky District:

- Artybash
- Biyka
- Chuyka
- Daybovo
- Dmitriyevka
- Iogach
- Kanachak
- Kayashkan
- Kebezen
- Kurmach-Baygol
- Lebedskoye
- Maysk
- Novo-Troitsk
- Ogni
- Ozero-Kureyevo
- Sankin Ail
- Shunarak
- Sovetsky Baygol
- Stary Kebezen
- Suranash
- Syurya
- Talon
- Tondoshka
- Tuloy
- Turochak
- Udalovka
- Ust-Lebed
- Ust-Pyzha
- Verkh-Biysk
- Yaylyu

== Ulagansky District ==
Rural localities in Ulagansky District:

- Aktash
- Balykcha
- Balyktyul
- Bele
- Chibilya
- Chibit
- Kara-Kudyur
- Kokbesh
- Koo
- Pasparta
- Saratan
- Ulagan
- Yazula

== Ust-Kansky District ==
Rural localities in Ust-Kansky District:

- Bely Anuy
- Chyorny Anuy
- Karakol
- Kaysyn
- Keley
- Korgon
- Kozul
- Kyrlyk
- Mendur-Sokkon
- Oro
- Ozyornoye
- Sanarovka
- Talitsa
- Turata
- Tyudrala
- Ust-Kan
- Ust-Kumir
- Ust-Muta
- Verkh-Anuy
- Verkh-Muta
- Verkh-Yabogan
- Vladimirovka
- Yabogan
- Yakonur

== Ust-Koksinsky District ==
Rural localities in Ust-Koksinsky District:

- Abay
- Ak-Koba
- Amur
- Bannoye
- Bashtala
- Berezovka
- Chendek
- Gagarka
- Gorbunovo
- Karagay
- Kastakha
- Katanda
- Kaytanak
- Krasnoyarka
- Krasnoyarka
- Kucherla
- Kurdyum
- Kurunda
- Maralnik-1
- Maralnik-2
- Maralovodka
- Margala
- Multa
- Nizhny Uymon
- Ognyovka
- Oktyabrskoye
- Polevodka
- Sakhsabay
- Siny Yar
- Souzar
- Sugash
- Talda
- Terekta
- Tikhonkaya
- Tuguryuk
- Tyungur
- Ust-Koksa
- Verkh-Uymon
- Vlasyevo
- Yustik
- Zamulta

== See also ==
- Lists of rural localities in Russia
