= Lebedskoye =

Lebedskoye Лебедское
- Selo
- Location within Altai Republic Location within Russia
- Coordinates: 52°17′N 87°06′E
- Country: Russia
- Region: Altai Republic
- District: Turochaksky District
- Time zone: UTC+7:00

Lebedskoye (Russian: Лебедское; Altay: Лебедский, Lebedskiy) is a rural locality (a selo) in Turochaksky District, the Altai Republic, Russia. The population was 2 as of 2016. There are 2 streets.

== Geography ==
Lebedskoye is located 6 km north of Turochak (the district's administrative centre) by road. Turochak is the nearest rural locality.
