= Mendur-Sokkon =

Mendur-Sokkon Мендур-Соккон
- Selo
- Location within Altai Republic Location within Russia
- Coordinates: 50°47′N 84°48′E
- Country: Russia
- Region: Altai Republic
- District: Ust-Kansky District
- Time zone: UTC+7:00

Mendur-Sokkon (Russian: Мендур-Соккон; Altay: Мӧндӱр-Соккон, Möndür-Sokkon) is a rural locality (a selo) in Ust-Kansky District, the Altai Republic, Russia. The population was 686 as of 2016. There are 9 streets.

== Geography ==
Mendur-Sokkon is located 21 km north of Ust-Kan (the district's administrative centre) by road. Kyrlyk is the nearest rural locality.
