= Ozyornoye, Ongudaysky District, Altai Republic =

Ozyornoye Озёрное
- Selo
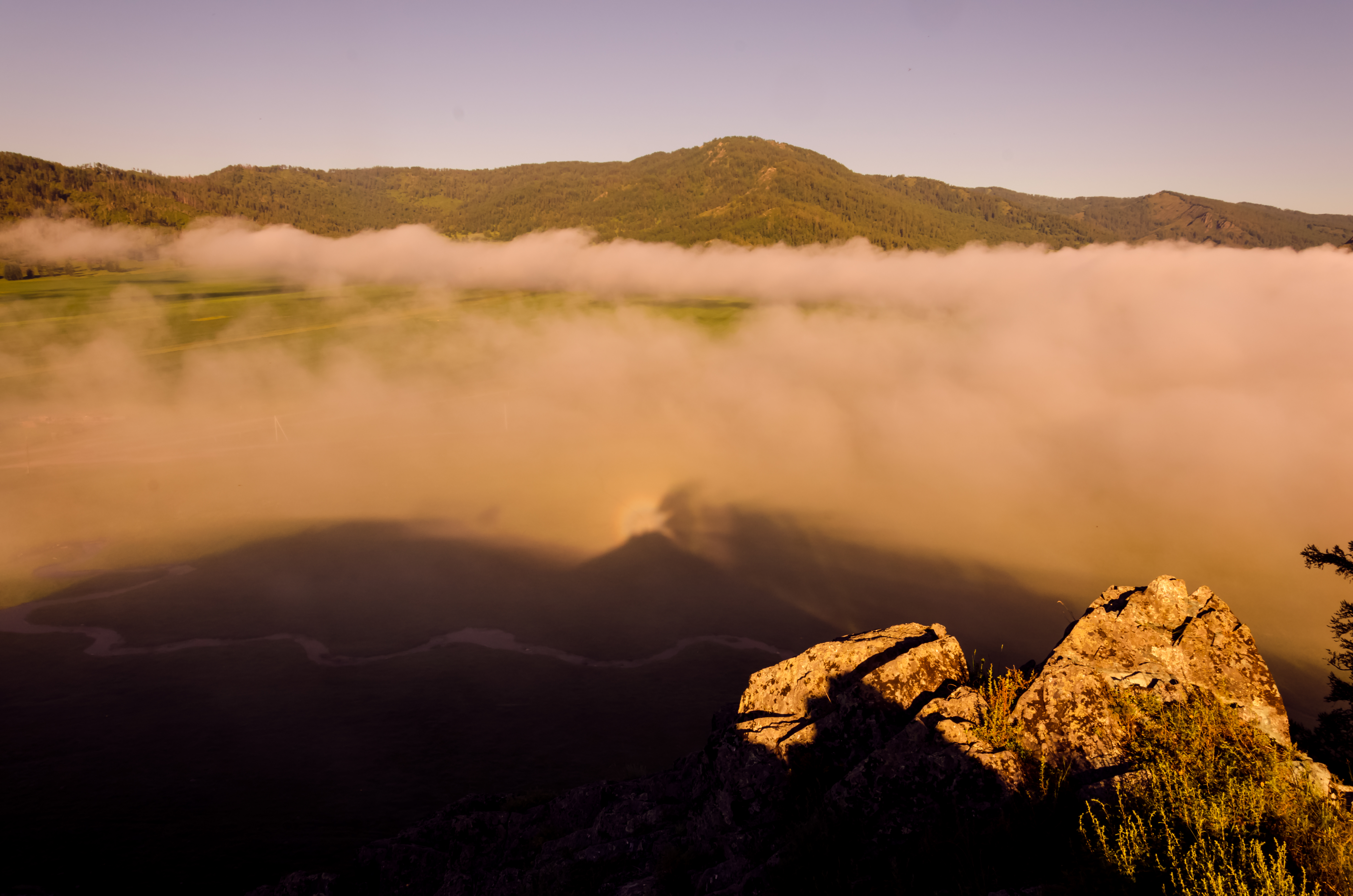
- The valley where the village is under clouds

- Location within Altai Republic Location within Russia
- Coordinates: 50°54′N 85°34′E
- Country: Russia
- Region: Altai Republic
- District: Ongudaysky District
- Time zone: UTC+7:00

Ozyornoye (Russian: Озёрное; Altay: Буландык, Bulandık) is a rural locality (a selo) in Ongudaysky District, the Altai Republic, Russia. The population was 261 as of 2016. There are 5 streets.

== Geography ==
Ozyornoye is located 50 km northwest of Onguday (the district's administrative centre) by road. Tenga is the nearest rural locality.
