= Maralnik-1 =

Maralnik-1 Маральник-1
- Settlement
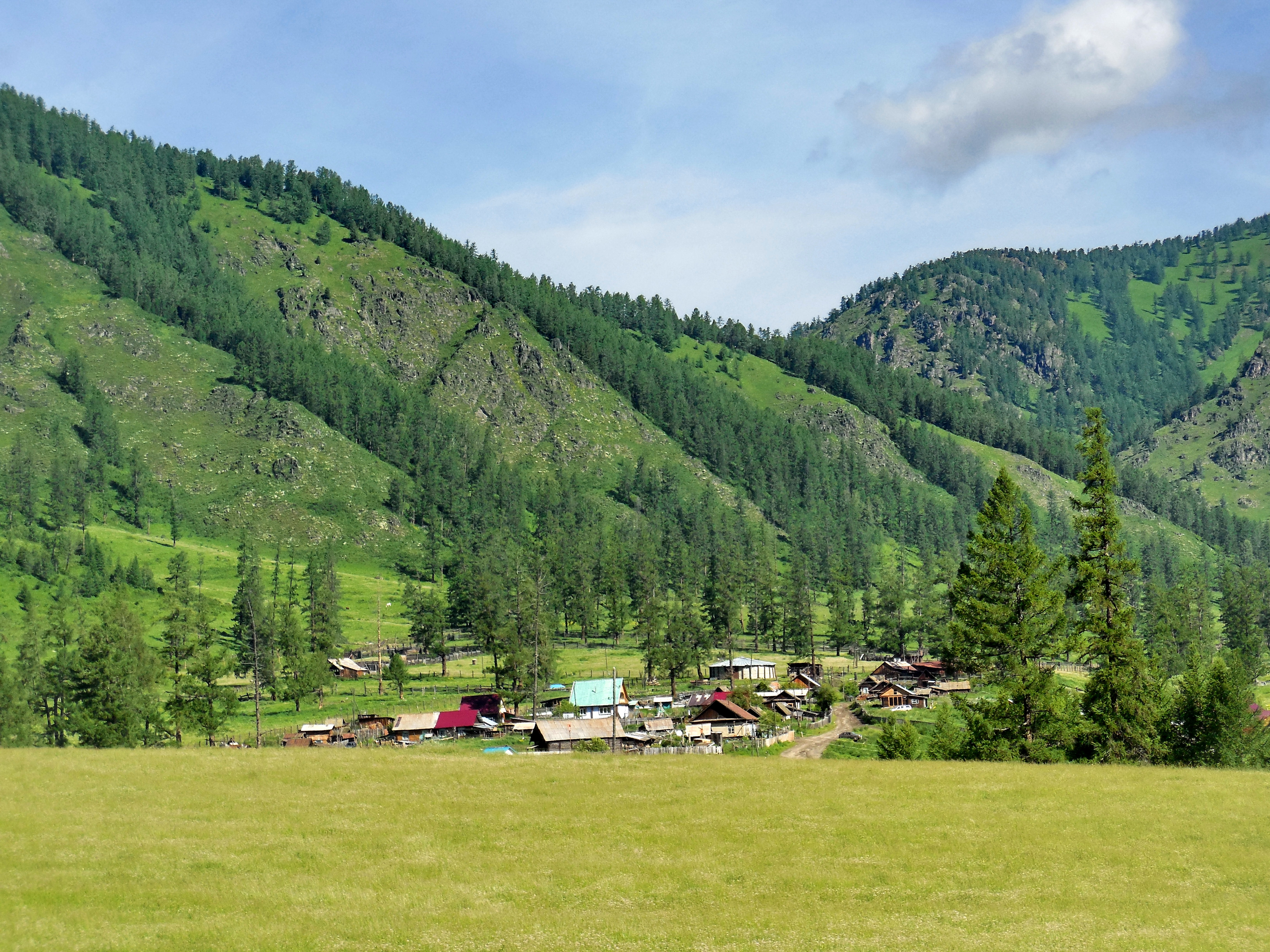
- View of the village

- Location within Altai Republic Location within Russia
- Coordinates: 50°05′N 85°54′E
- Country: Russia
- Region: Altai Republic
- District: Ust-Koksinsky District
- Time zone: UTC+7:00

Maralnik-1 (Russian: Маральник-1) is a rural locality (a settlement) in Ust-Koksinsky District, the Altai Republic, Russia. The population was 56 as of 2016. There are 2 streets.

== Geography ==
Maralnik-1 is located 43 km southeast of Ust-Koksa (the district's administrative centre) by road. Multa is the nearest rural locality.
