= Besh-Ozyok =

Besh-Ozyok Беш-Озёк
- Village
- Location within Altai Republic Location within Russia
- Coordinates: 51°07′N 85°14′E
- Country: Russia
- Region: Altai Republic
- District: Shebalinsky District
- Time zone: UTC+7:00

Besh-Ozyok (Russian: Беш-Озёк; Altay: Беш-Ӧзӧк, Beş-Özök) is a rural locality (a selo) and the administrative centre of Besh-Ozyokskoye Rural Settlement of Shebalinsky District, the Altai Republic, Russia. The population was 577 as of 2016. There are 8 streets.

== Geography ==
Besh-Ozyok is located 114 km southwest of Shebalino (the district's administrative centre) by road. Shyrgaytu is the nearest rural locality.
