= Sanarovka =

Sanarovka Санаровка
- Selo
- Location within Altai Republic Location within Russia
- Coordinates: 51°03′N 84°23′E
- Country: Russia
- Region: Altai Republic
- District: Ust-Kansky District
- Time zone: UTC+7:00

Sanarovka (Russian: Санаровка; Altay: Ӱстӱги-Айты-Коол, Üstügi-Aytı-Kool) is a rural locality (a selo) in Ust-Kansky District, the Altai Republic, Russia. The population was 106 as of 2016. There are 2 streets.

== Geography ==
Sanarovka is located 47 km northwest of Ust-Kan (the district's administrative centre) by road. Talitsa is the nearest rural locality.
