= Tobeler =

Tobeler Тобелер
- Selo
- Location within Altai Republic Location within Russia
- Coordinates: 49°54′N 88°47′E
- Country: Russia
- Region: Altai Republic
- District: Kosh-Agachsky District
- Time zone: UTC+7:00

Tobeler (Russian: Тобелер; Altay: Тöбöлöр, Töbölör) is a rural locality (a selo) in Kosh-Agachsky District, the Altai Republic, Russia. The population was 915 as of 2016. There are 14 streets.

== Geography ==
Tobeler is located 17 km southeast of Kosh-Agach (the district's administrative centre) by road. Zhana-Aul and Kosh-Agach are the nearest rural localities.
