= Bely Anuy =

Bely Anuy Белый Ануй
- Selo
- Location within Altai Republic Location within Russia
- Coordinates: 51°13′N 84°54′E
- Country: Russia
- Region: Altai Republic
- District: Ust-Kansky District
- Time zone: UTC+7:00

Bely Anuy (Russian: Белый Ануй; Altay: Јалаҥай, Ĵalañay) is a rural locality (a selo) and the administrative centre of Beloanuyskoye Rural Settlement, Ust-Kansky District, the Altai Republic, Russia. The population was 736 as of 2016. There are 7 streets.

== Geography ==
Bely Anuy is located 50 km north of Ust-Kan (the district's administrative centre) by road. Turata and Verkhny Beloanuy are the nearest rural localities.
