= Karym (rural locality) =

Karym Карым
- Settlement
- Location within Altai Republic Location within Russia
- Coordinates: 51°44′N 85°49′E
- Country: Russia
- Region: Altai Republic
- District: Mayminsky District
- Time zone: UTC+7:00

Karym (Russian: Карым, Altay: Карым, Karım) is a rural locality (a settlement) in Ust-Muninskoye Rural Settlement of Mayminsky District, the Altai Republic, Russia. The population was 81 as of 2016. There are 2 streets.

== Geography ==
Karym is located 53 km south of Mayma (the district's administrative centre) by road. Ust-Muny is the nearest rural locality.
