= Yaylyu =

Yaylyu Яйлю
- Village
- Location within Altai Republic Location within Russia
- Coordinates: 51°46′N 87°36′E
- Country: Russia
- Region: Altai Republic
- District: Turochaksky District
- Time zone: UTC+7:00

Yaylyu (Russian: Яйлю; Altay: Jайлу, Ĵaylu) is a rural locality (a selo) in Artybashskoye Rural Settlement of Turochaksky District, the Altai Republic, Russia. The population was 183 as of 2016. There are 3 streets.

== Geography ==
Yaylyu is located on the right bank of the middle part of the Lake Teletskoye, on the Yailinsky terrace at the mouth of the Ilanda River, 100 km south of Turochak (the district's administrative centre) by road. Biyka is the nearest rural locality.
