= Kyzyl-Ozyok =

Kyzyl-Ozyok Кызыл-Озёк
- Village
- Location within Altai Republic Location within Russia
- Coordinates: 51°53′N 85°59′E
- Country: Russia
- Region: Altai Republic
- District: Mayminsky District
- Time zone: UTC+7:00

Kyzyl-Ozyok (Russian: Кызыл-Озёк; Altay: Кызыл-Ӧзӧк, Kızıl-Özök) is a rural locality (a selo) and the administrative centre of Kyzyl-Ozyokskoye Rural Settlement of Mayminsky District, the Altai Republic, Russia. The population was 4746 as of 2016. There are 4 streets.

== Geography ==
Kyzyl-Ozyok is located 18 km southeast of Mayma (the district's administrative centre) by road. Gorno-Altaysk is the nearest rural locality.

== Climate ==
Climate data for Kyzyl-Ozyok (1991–2020, extremes 1929–present)
Month	Jan	Feb	Mar	Apr	May	Jun	Jul	Aug	Sep	Oct	Nov	Dec	Year
Record high °C (°F)	13.5 (56.3)	15.2 (59.4)	25.3 (77.5)	33.6 (92.5)	36.1 (97.0)	37.5 (99.5)	39.6 (103.3)	39.6 (103.3)	36.4 (97.5)	29.8 (85.6)	24.0 (75.2)	16.5 (61.7)	39.6 (103.3)
Mean daily maximum °C (°F)	−6.9 (19.6)	−3.7 (25.3)	3.0 (37.4)	13.3 (55.9)	20.5 (68.9)	24.6 (76.3)	26.1 (79.0)	24.5 (76.1)	18.4 (65.1)	11.5 (52.7)	1.0 (33.8)	−5.1 (22.8)	10.6 (51.1)
Daily mean °C (°F)	−14.1 (6.6)	−11.9 (10.6)	−4.6 (23.7)	5.2 (41.4)	12.0 (53.6)	17.1 (62.8)	19.0 (66.2)	16.9 (62.4)	10.7 (51.3)	4.1 (39.4)	−5.4 (22.3)	−11.5 (11.3)	3.1 (37.6)
Mean daily minimum °C (°F)	−18.8 (−1.8)	−17.4 (0.7)	−10.3 (13.5)	−1.1 (30.0)	4.8 (40.6)	10.4 (50.7)	13.1 (55.6)	10.9 (51.6)	5.0 (41.0)	−0.7 (30.7)	−9.6 (14.7)	−16.2 (2.8)	−2.5 (27.5)
Record low °C (°F)	−46.4 (−51.5)	−43.9 (−47.0)	−36.3 (−33.3)	−31.5 (−24.7)	−15.1 (4.8)	−2.0 (28.4)	2.6 (36.7)	−1.0 (30.2)	−8.3 (17.1)	−24.7 (−12.5)	−42.8 (−45.0)	−48.6 (−55.5)	−48.6 (−55.5)
Average precipitation mm (inches)	22 (0.9)	23 (0.9)	32 (1.3)	62 (2.4)	86 (3.4)	90 (3.5)	114 (4.5)	93 (3.7)	72 (2.8)	58 (2.3)	48 (1.9)	34 (1.3)	734 (28.9)
Source: Pogoda.ru.net
