= Shiba, Altai Republic =

Shiba Шиба
- Selo
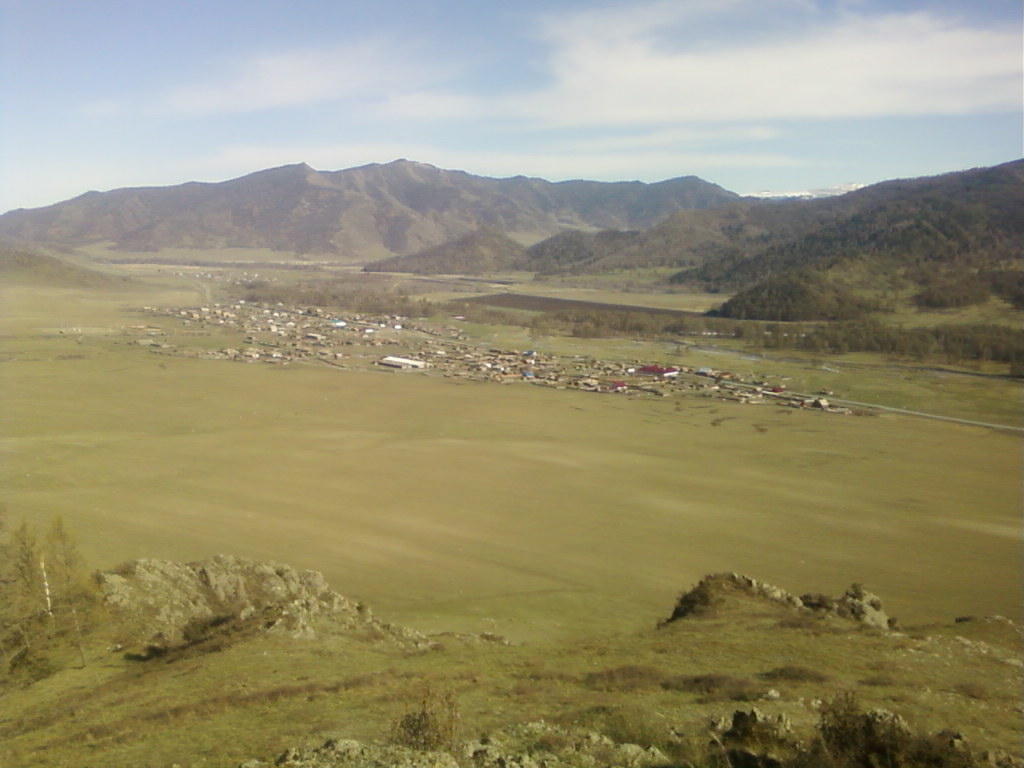
- View of Shiba settlement

- Location within Altai Republic Location within Russia
- Coordinates: 50°50′N 85°44′E
- Country: Russia
- Region: Altai Republic
- District: Ongudaysky District
- Time zone: UTC+7:00

Shiba (Russian: Шиба; Altay: Шибее, Şibeye) is a rural locality (a selo) in Ongudaysky District, the Altai Republic, Russia. The population was 301 as of 2016. There are 3 streets.

== Geography ==
Shiba is located 34 km northwest of Onguday (the district's administrative centre) by road. Talda is the nearest rural locality.
