= Verkh-Biysk =

Verkh-Biysk Верх-Бийск
- Selo
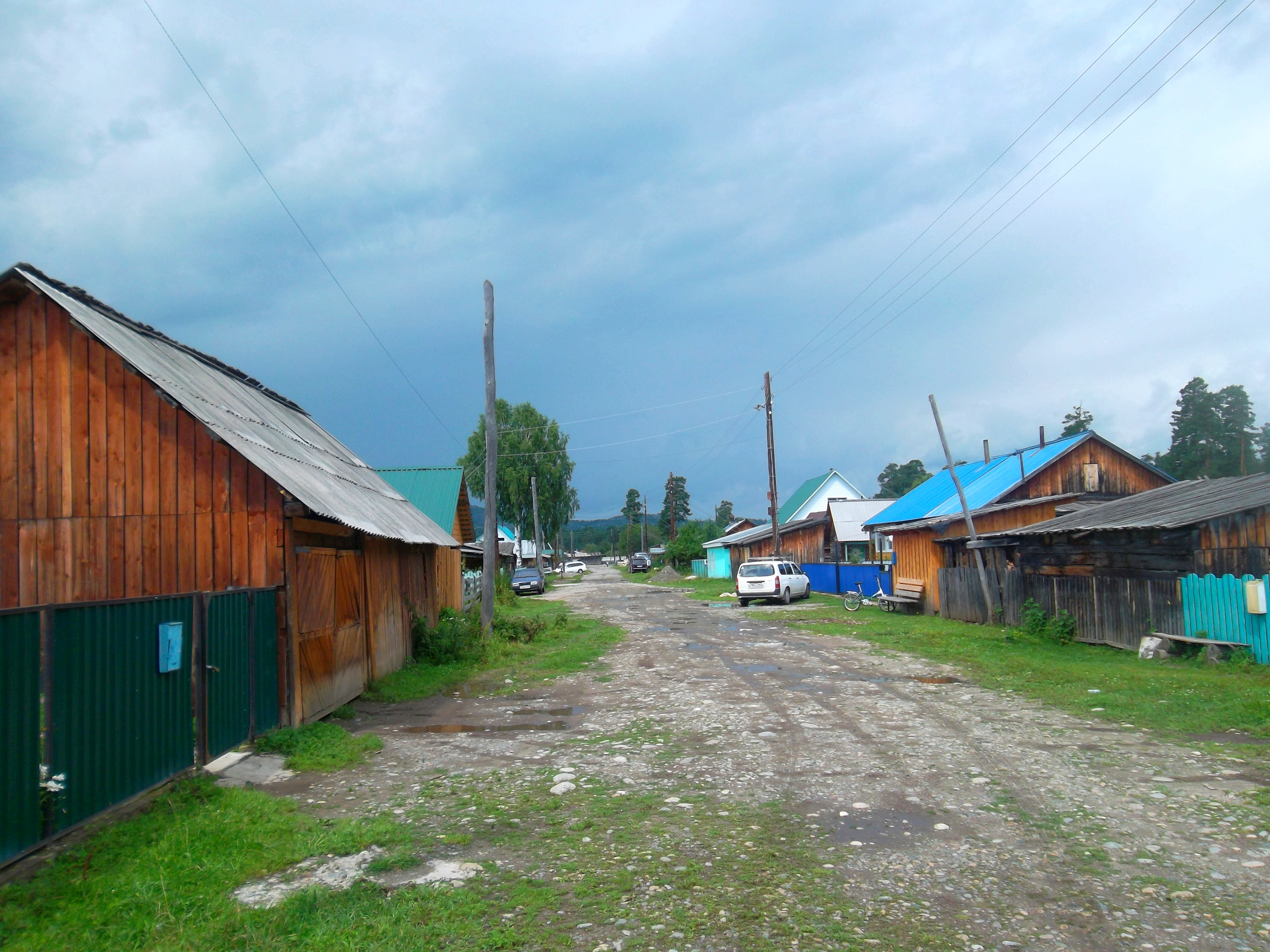

- Location within Altai Republic Location within Russia
- Coordinates: 52°02′N 87°05′E
- Country: Russia
- Region: Altai Republic
- District: Turochaksky District
- Time zone: UTC+7:00

Verkh-Biysk (Russian: Верх-Бийск; Altay: Јар-Айыл, Ĵap-Ayıl) is a rural locality (a selo) in Turochaksky District, the Altai Republic, Russia. The population was 465 as of 2016. There are 15 streets.

== Geography ==
Verkh-Biysk is located 27 km south of Turochak (the district's administrative centre) by road. Tuloy is the nearest rural locality.
