= Kaytanak =

Kaytanak Кайтанак
- Selo
- Location within Altai Republic Location within Russia
- Coordinates: 50°09′N 85°27′E
- Country: Russia
- Region: Altai Republic
- District: Ust-Koksinsky District
- Time zone: UTC+7:00

Kaytanak (Russian: Кайтанак; Altay: Кайтанак) is a rural locality (a selo) in Ust-Koksinsky District, the Altai Republic, Russia. The population was 337 as of 2016. There are 4 streets.

== Geography ==
Kaytanak is located 21 km southwest of Ust-Koksa (the district's administrative centre) by road. Maralovodka is the nearest rural locality.
