= Verkh-Muta =

Verkh-Muta Верх-Мута
- Selo
- Location within Altai Republic Location within Russia
- Coordinates: 51°11′N 84°40′E
- Country: Russia
- Region: Altai Republic
- District: Ust-Kansky District
- Time zone: UTC+7:00

Verkh-Muta (Russian: Верх-Мута; Altay: Моты-Бажы, Motı-Bajı) is a rural locality (a selo) in Ust-Kansky District, the Altai Republic, Russia. The population was 108 as of 2016. There are 2 streets.

== Geography ==
Verkh-Muta is located 49 km north of Ust-Kan (the district's administrative centre) by road. Ust-Muta is the nearest rural locality.
