= Edigan =

Edigan Эдиган
- Village
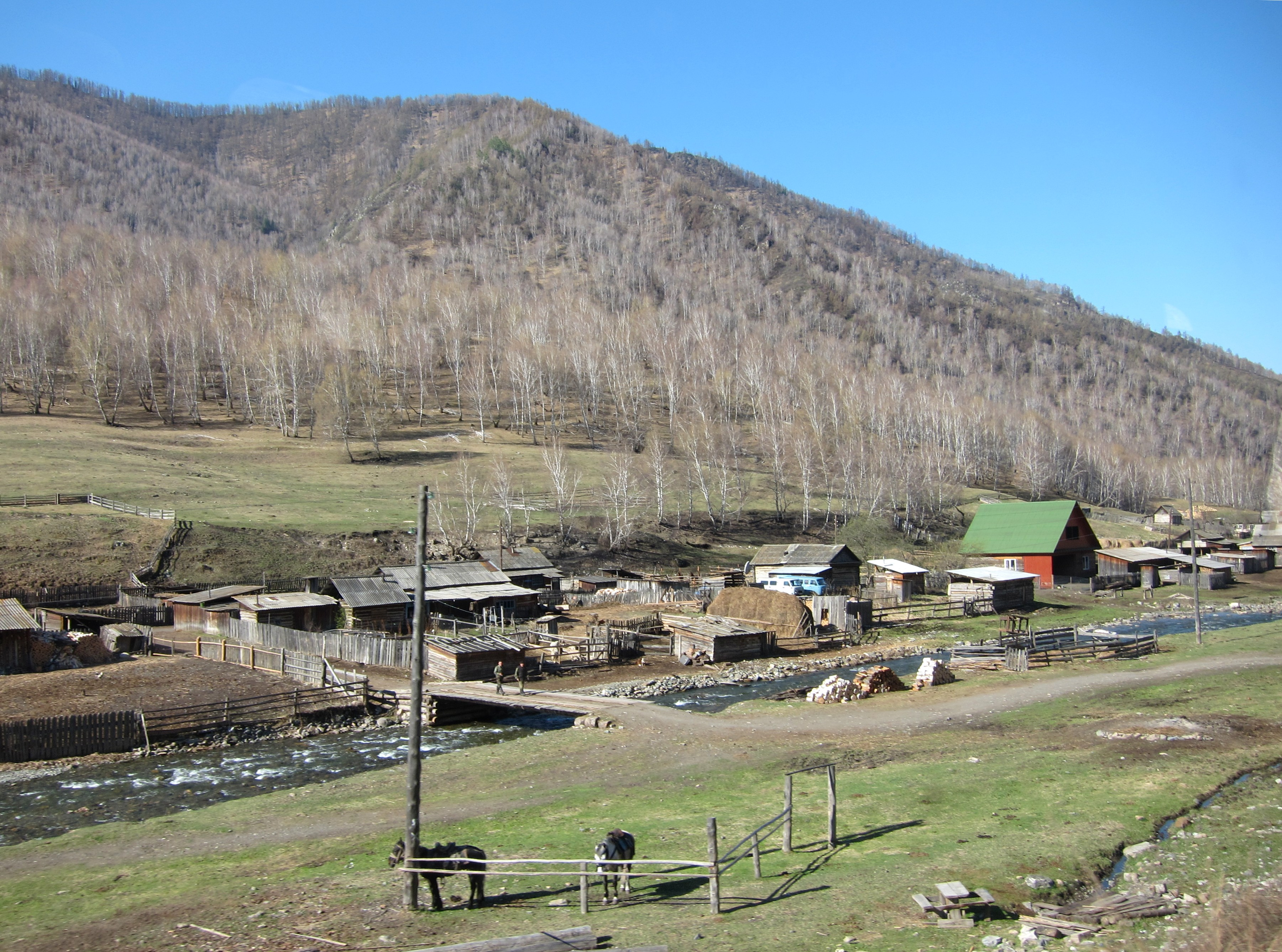

- Location within Altai Republic Location within Russia
- Coordinates: 51°06′N 86°15′E
- Country: Russia
- Region: Altai Republic
- District: Chemalsky District
- Time zone: UTC+7:00

Edigan (Russian: Эдиган; Altay: Эјеган, Eĵegan) is a rural locality (a selo) in Kuyusskoye Rural Settlement of Chemalsky District, the Altai Republic, Russia. The population was 246 as of 2016. There are 5 streets.

== Geography ==
Edigan is located in the valley of the Edigan River, 53 km southeast of Chemal (the district's administrative centre) by road. Kuyus is the nearest rural locality.
