= Oroktoy =

Oroktoy Ороктой
- Village
- Location within Altai Republic Location within Russia
- Coordinates: 51°03′N 86°06′E
- Country: Russia
- Region: Altai Republic
- District: Chemalsky District
- Time zone: UTC+7:00

Oroktoy (Russian: Ороктой; Altay: Ороктой) is a rural locality (a selo) in the Kuyusskoye Rural Settlement of Chemalsky District, Altai Republic, Russia. The population was 195 as of 2016.

== Geography ==
Oroktoy is located in the valley of the Oroktoy River, 53 km south of Chemal (the district's administrative centre) by road. Kuyus is the nearest rural locality.
