= Ulalushka =

Ulalushka Улалушка
- Settlement
- Location within Altai Republic Location within Russia
- Coordinates: 51°56′N 86°05′E
- Country: Russia
- Region: Altai Republic
- District: Mayminsky District
- Time zone: UTC+7:00

Ulalushka (Russian: Улалушка; Altay: Улалушка, Ulaluşka) is a rural locality (a settlement) in Mayminsky District, the Altai Republic, Russia. The population was 9 as of 2016.

== Geography ==
Ulalushka is located 20 km southeast of Mayma (the district's administrative centre) by road. Alfyorovo is the nearest rural locality.
