= Kanachak, Altai Republic =

Kanachak Каначак
- Selo
- Location within Altai Republic Location within Russia
- Coordinates: 52°27′N 86°43′E
- Country: Russia
- Region: Altai Republic
- District: Turochaksky District
- Time zone: UTC+7:00

Kanachak (Russian: Каначак; Altay: Каначак, Kanaçak) is a rural locality (a selo) in Turochaksky District, the Altai Republic, Russia. The population was 106 as of 2016. There are 5 streets.

== Geography ==
Kanachak is located 47 km northwest of Turochak (the district's administrative centre) by road. Ozero-Kureyevo is the nearest rural locality.
