= Chibilya =

Chibilya Чибиля
- Village
- Location within Altai Republic Location within Russia
- Coordinates: 50°37′N 87°55′E
- Country: Russia
- Region: Altai Republic
- District: Ulagansky District
- Time zone: UTC+7:00

Chibilya (Russian: Чибиля; Altay: Чибилӱ, Çibilü) is a rural locality (a selo) and the administrative centre of Yaboganskoye Rural Settlement of Ulagansky District, the Altai Republic, Russia. The population was 699 as of 2016. There are 7 streets.

== Geography ==
Chibilya is located 3 km southwest of Ulagan (the district's administrative centre) by road. Ulagan is the nearest rural locality.
