= Iodro =

Iodro Иодро
- Selo
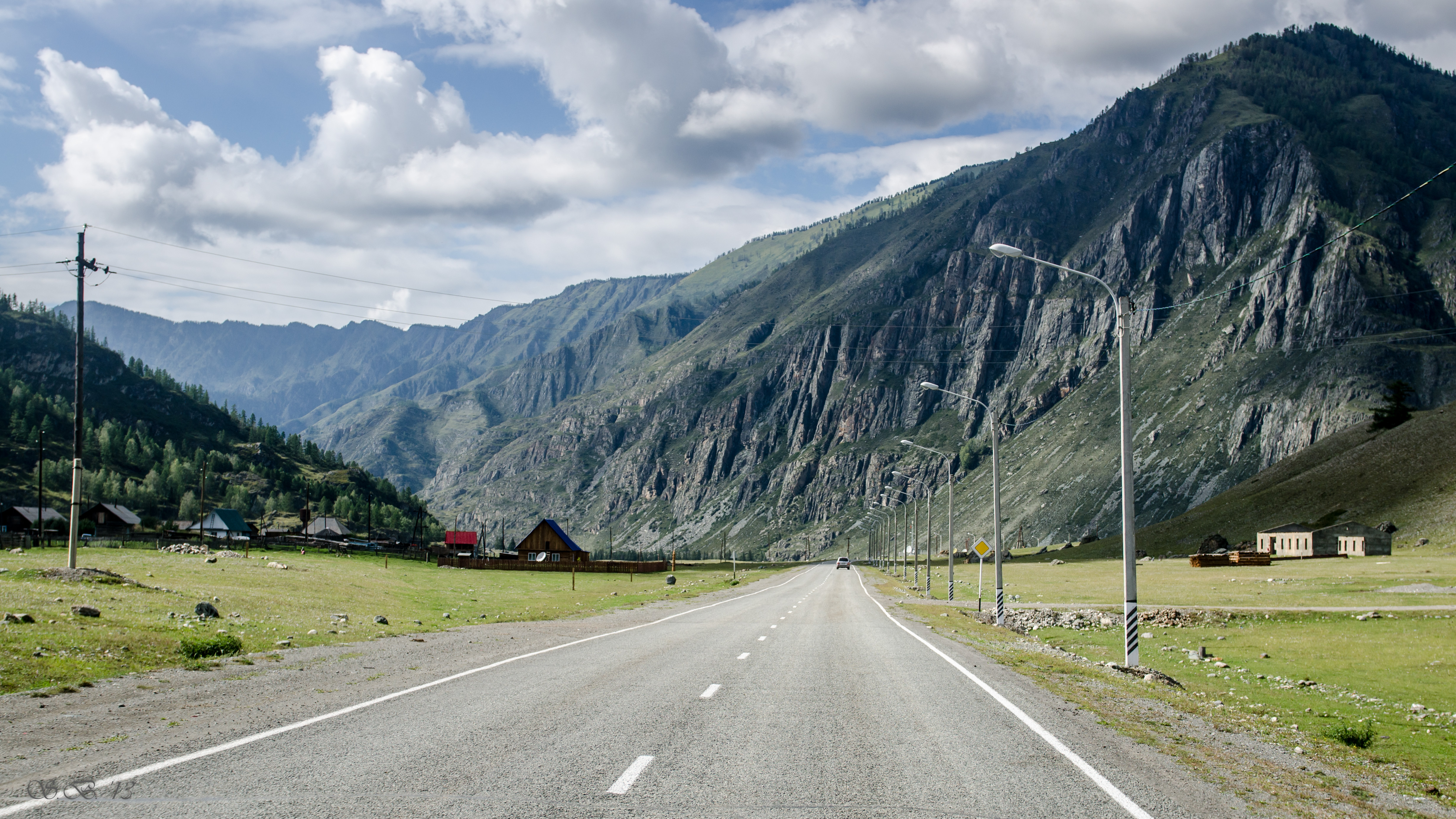

- Location within Altai Republic Location within Russia
- Coordinates: 50°23′N 86°58′E
- Country: Russia
- Region: Altai Republic
- District: Ongudaysky District
- Time zone: UTC+7:00

Iodro (Russian: Иодро; Altay: Jодро, Ĵodro) is a rural locality (a selo) in Ongudaysky District, the Altai Republic, Russia. The population was 268 as of 2016. There are 4 streets.

== Geography ==
Iodro is located 100 km southeast of Onguday (the district's administrative centre) by road. Akbom is the nearest rural locality.
