= Verkh-Karaguzh =

Verkh-Karaguzh Верх-Карагуж
- Village
- Location within Altai Republic Location within Russia
- Coordinates: 52°03′N 86°03′E
- Country: Russia
- Region: Altai Republic
- District: Mayminsky District
- Time zone: UTC+7:00

Verkh-Karaguzh (Russian: Верх-Карагуж; Altay: Ӱстӱги Кара-Куш, Üstügi Kara-Kuş) is a rural locality (a selo) in Mayminskoye Rural Settlement of Mayminsky District, the Altai Republic, Russia. The population was 481 as of 2016. There are 5 streets.

== Geography ==
Verkh-Karaguzh is located 17 km northeast of Mayma (the district's administrative centre) by road. Mayma is the nearest rural locality.
