= Sovetsky Baygol =

Sovetsky Baygol Советский Байгол
- Village
- Location within Altai Republic Location within Russia
- Coordinates: 52°04′N 87°43′E
- Country: Russia
- Region: Altai Republic
- District: Turochaksky District
- Time zone: UTC+7:00

Sovetsky Baygol (Russian: Советский Байгол; Altay: Байгол, Baygol) is a rural locality (a selo) in Turochakskoye Rural Settlement of Turochaksky District, the Altai Republic, Russia. The population was 9 as of 2016. There is 1 street.

== Geography ==
Sovetsky Baygol is located near the Baygol River, 97 km southeast of Turochak (the district's administrative centre) by road. Kurmach-Baygol is the nearest rural locality.
