= Maralnik-2 =

Maralnik-2 Маральник-2
- Settlement
- Location within Altai Republic Location within Russia
- Coordinates: 50°13′N 86°02′E
- Country: Russia
- Region: Altai Republic
- District: Ust-Koksinsky District
- Time zone: UTC+7:00

Maralnik-2 (Russian: Маральник-2) is a rural locality (a settlement) in Ust-Koksinsky District, the Altai Republic, Russia. The population was 8 as of 2016. There is 1 street.

== Geography ==
Maralnik-2 is located 19 km south of Ust-Koksa (the district's administrative centre) by road. Verkh-Uymon is the nearest rural locality.
