= Ulita, Altai Republic =

Ulita Улита
- Selo
- Location within Altai Republic Location within Russia
- Coordinates: 50°42′N 86°12′E
- Country: Russia
- Region: Altai Republic
- District: Ongudaysky District
- Time zone: UTC+7:00

Ulita (Russian: Улита; Altay: Ӧлӧти, Ölöti, or Оло-Туу, Olo-Tuu) is a rural locality (a selo) in Ongudaysky District, the Altai Republic, Russia. The population was 266 as of 2016. There are 3 streets.

== Geography ==
Ulita is located 9 km southeast of Onguday (the district's administrative centre) by road. Onguday is the nearest rural locality.
