= Udalovka =

Udalovka Удаловка
- Selo
- Location within Altai Republic Location within Russia
- Coordinates: 52°21′N 86°56′E
- Country: Russia
- Region: Altai Republic
- District: Turochaksky District
- Time zone: UTC+7:00

Udalovka (Russian: Удаловка; Altay: Ала-Кайыҥ, Ala-Kayıñ) is a rural locality (a selo) in Turochaksky District, the Altai Republic, Russia. The population was 160 as of 2016. There are 2 streets.

== Geography ==
Udalovka is located 23 km northwest of Turochak (the district's administrative centre) by road. Dmitriyevka and Turochak are the nearest rural localities.
