= Kurdyum =

Kurdyum Курдюм
- Selo
- Location within Altai Republic Location within Russia
- Coordinates: 50°23′N 84°34′E
- Country: Russia
- Region: Altai Republic
- District: Ust-Koksinsky District
- Time zone: UTC+7:00

Kurdyum (Russian: Курдюм; Altay: Курjум, Kurĵum) is a rural locality (a selo) in Ust-Koksinsky District, the Altai Republic, Russia. The population was 37 as of 2016. There is 1 street.

== Geography ==
Kurdyum is located 97 km west of Ust-Koksa (the district's administrative centre) by road. Karagay is the nearest rural locality.
