= Ishinsk =

Ishinsk Ишинск
- Village
- Location within Altai Republic Location within Russia
- Coordinates: 52°01′N 86°40′E
- Country: Russia
- Region: Altai Republic
- District: Choysky District
- Time zone: UTC+7:00

Ishinsk (Russian: Ишинск; Altay: Ыжы, Ijı) is a rural locality (a selo) in Choyskoye Rural Settlement of Choysky District, the Altai Republic, Russia. The population was 3 as of 2016.

== Geography ==
Ishinsk is located on the right bank of the Isha River, 12 km east of Choya (the district's administrative centre) by road. Sovetskoye is the nearest rural locality.
