= Verkh-Yabogan =

Verkh-Yabogan Верх-Ябоган
- Village
- Location within Altai Republic Location within Russia
- Coordinates: 50°55′N 85°13′E
- Country: Russia
- Region: Altai Republic
- District: Ust-Kansky District
- Time zone: UTC+7:00

Verkh-Yabogan (Russian: Верх-Ябоган; Altay: Јабаган-Бажы, Ĵabagan-Bajı) is a rural locality (a selo) in Yaboganskoye Rural Settlement of Ust-Kansky District, the Altai Republic, Russia. The population was 116 as of 2016. There are 3 streets.

== Geography ==
Verkh-Yabogan is located 38 km east of Ust-Kan (the district's administrative centre) by road. Yabogan is the nearest rural locality.
