= Keley =

Keley Келей
- Selo
- Location within Altai Republic Location within Russia
- Coordinates: 51°10′N 84°45′E
- Country: Russia
- Region: Altai Republic
- District: Ust-Kansky District
- Time zone: UTC+7:00

Keley (Russian: Келей; Altay: Келей) is a rural locality (a selo) in Ust-Kansky District, the Altai Republic, Russia. The population was 130 as of 2016. There are 3 streets.

== Geography ==
Keley is located 36 km north of Ust-Kan (the district's administrative centre) by road. Ust-Muta and Verkh-Muta are the nearest rural localities.
