= Kyrlyk =

Kyrlyk Кырлык
- Selo
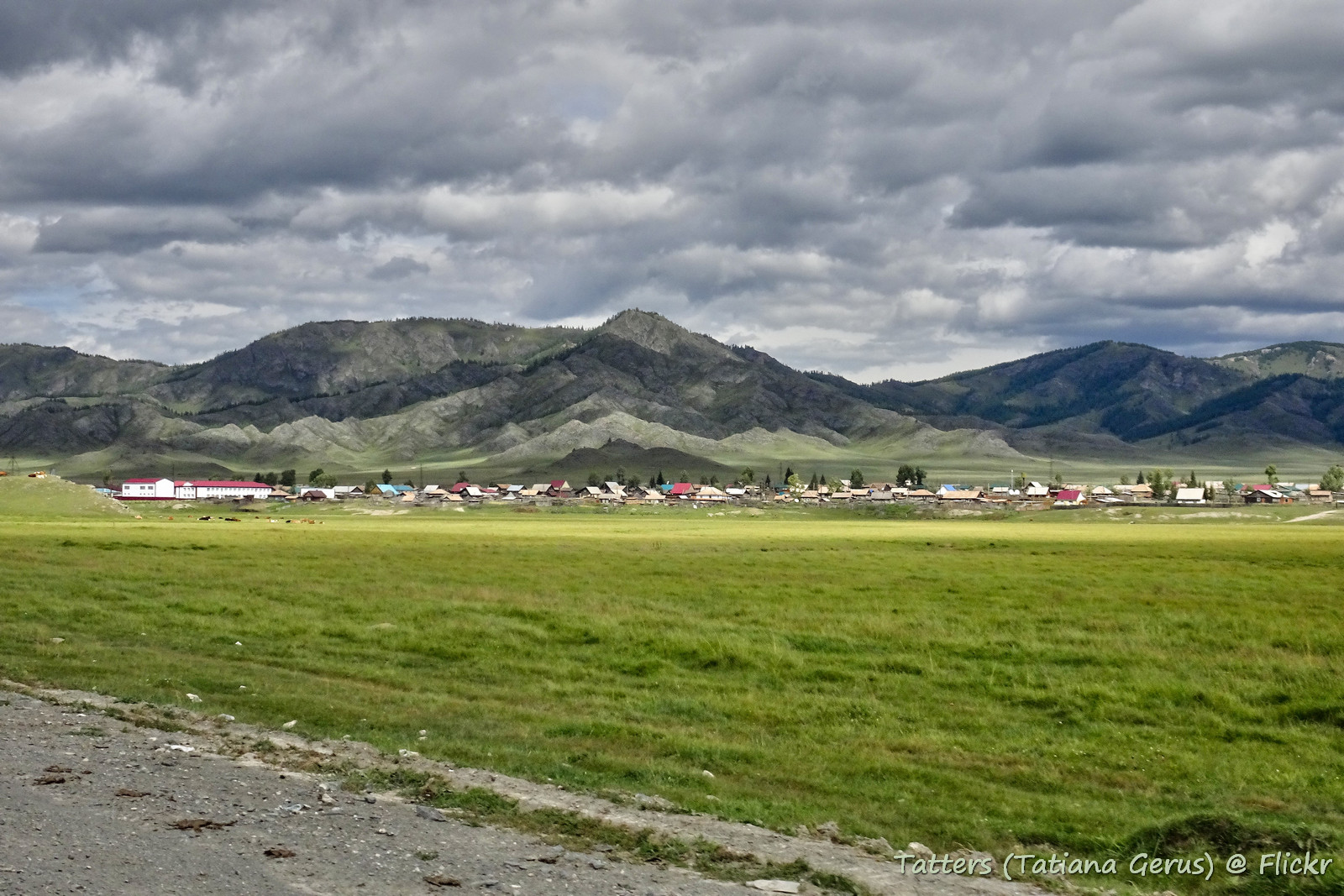
- Kyrlyk

- Location within Altai Republic Location within Russia
- Coordinates: 50°48′N 84°56′E
- Country: Russia
- Region: Altai Republic
- District: Ust-Kansky District
- Time zone: UTC+7:00

Kyrlyk (Russian: Кырлык; Altay: Кырлык, Kırlık) is a rural locality (a selo) and the administrative centre of Kyrlykskoye Rural Settlement, Ust-Kansky District, the Altai Republic, Russia. The population was 1,006 as of 2016. There are 17 streets.

== Geography ==
Kyrlyk is located 21 km southeast of Ust-Kan (the district's administrative centre) by road. Mendur-Sokkon is the nearest rural locality.
