= Moguta =

Moguta Могута
- Selo
- Location within Altai Republic Location within Russia
- Coordinates: 51°32′N 85°25′E
- Country: Russia
- Region: Altai Republic
- District: Shebalinsky District
- Time zone: UTC+7:00

Moguta (Russian: Могута; Altay: Могойты, Mogoytı) is a rural locality (a selo) in Shebalinsky District, the Altai Republic, Russia. The population was 31 as of 2016. There is 1 street.

== Geography ==
Moguta is located 51 km northwest of Shebalino (the district's administrative centre) by road. Uluscherga is the nearest rural locality.
