= Novy Beltir =

Novy Beltir Новый Бельтир
- Selo
- Location within Altai Republic Location within Russia
- Coordinates: 49°55′N 88°36′E
- Country: Russia
- Region: Altai Republic
- District: Kosh-Agachsky District
- Time zone: UTC+7:00

Novy Beltir (Russian: Новый Бельтир; Altay: Јаҥы Белтир, Ĵañı Beltir) is a rural locality (a selo) and the administrative centre of Beltirskoye Rural Settlement, Kosh-Agachsky District, the Altai Republic, Russia. The population was 1,248 as of 2016. There are 23 streets.

== Geography ==
Novy Beltir is located 10 km southwest of Kosh-Agach (the district's administrative centre) by road. Kosh-Agach is the nearest rural locality.
