= Kurota =

Kurota Курота
- Selo
- Location within Altai Republic Location within Russia
- Coordinates: 50°48′N 85°58′E
- Country: Russia
- Region: Altai Republic
- District: Ongudaysky District
- Time zone: UTC+7:00

Kurota (Russian: Курота; Altay: Короты, Korotı) is a rural locality (a selo) in Ongudaysky District, the Altai Republic, Russia. The population was 346 as of 2016. There are 4 streets.

== Geography ==
Kurota is located 15 km northwest of Onguday (the district's administrative centre) by road. Karakol is the nearest rural locality.
