= Ortolyk =

Ortolyk Ортолык
- Selo
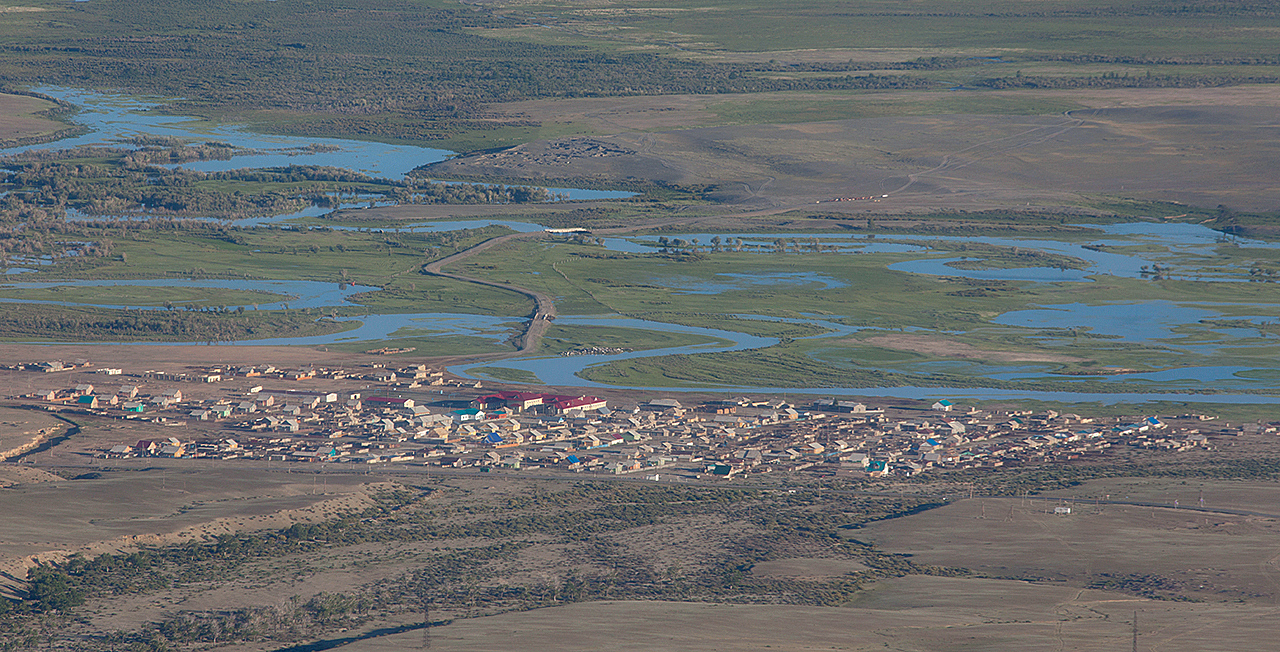
- Aerial view of the settlement

- Location within Altai Republic Location within Russia
- Coordinates: 50°02′N 88°30′E
- Country: Russia
- Region: Altai Republic
- District: Kosh-Agachsky District
- Time zone: UTC+7:00

Ortolyk (Russian: Ортолык; Altay: Ортолык, Ortolık) is a rural locality (a selo) in Kosh-Agachsky District, the Altai Republic, Russia. The population was 658 as of 2016. There are 9 streets.

== Geography ==
Ortolyk is located 16 km northwest of Kosh-Agach (the district's administrative centre) by road. Mukhor-Tarkhata is the nearest rural locality.
