= Chendek =

Chendek Чендек
- Selo
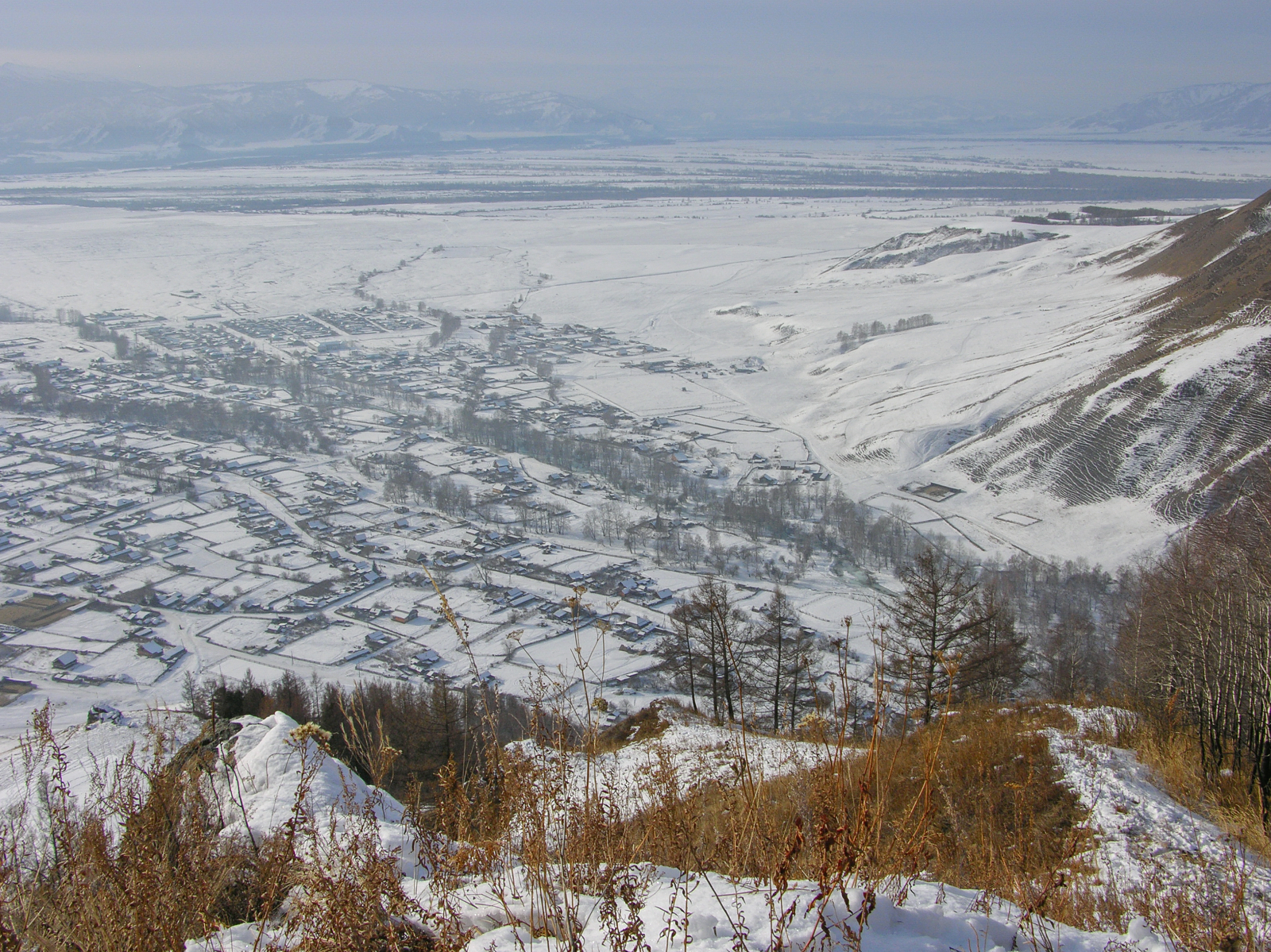
- View of the settlement in winter

- Location within Altai Republic Location within Russia
- Coordinates: 50°15′N 85°57′E
- Country: Russia
- Region: Altai Republic
- District: Ust-Koksinsky District
- Time zone: UTC+7:00

Chendek (Russian: Чендек; Altay: Чендек, Çendek) is a rural locality (a selo) and the administrative centre of Chendekskoye Rural Settlement, Ust-Koksinsky District, the Altai Republic, Russia. The population was 870 as of 2016. There are 27 streets.

== Geography ==
Chendek is located 29 km east of Ust-Koksa (the district's administrative centre) by road. Bashtala is the nearest rural locality.
