= Pasparta =

Pasparta Паспарта
- Selo
- Location within Altai Republic Location within Russia
- Coordinates: 50°50′N 87°52′E
- Country: Russia
- Region: Altai Republic
- District: Ulagansky District
- Time zone: UTC+7:00

Pasparta (Russian: Паспарта; Altay: Паспарты, Paspartı) is a rural locality (a selo) in Ulagansky District, the Altai Republic, Russia. The population was 276 as of 2016. There are 2 streets.

== Geography ==
Pasparta is located 34 km north of Ulagan (the district's administrative centre) by road. Balyktuyul is the nearest rural locality.
