= Novo-Troitsk =

Novo-Troitsk Ново-Троицк
- Selo
- Location within Altai Republic Location within Russia
- Coordinates: 51°45′N 87°06′E
- Country: Russia
- Region: Altai Republic
- District: Turochaksky District
- Time zone: UTC+7:00

Novo-Troitsk (Russian: Ново-Троицк) is a rural locality (a selo) in Turochaksky District, the Altai Republic, Russia. The population was 39 as of 2016. There are 10 streets.

== Geography ==
Novo-Troitsk is located 85 km south of Turochak (the district's administrative centre) by road. Iogach is the nearest rural locality.
