= Uluscherga =

Uluscherga Улусчерга
- Selo
- Location within Altai Republic Location within Russia
- Coordinates: 51°30′N 85°27′E
- Country: Russia
- Region: Altai Republic
- District: Shebalinsky District
- Time zone: UTC+7:00

Uluscherga (Russian: Улусчерга; Altay: Улус-Чаргы, Ulus-Çargı) is a rural locality (a selo) and the administrative centre of Uluscherginskoye Rural Settlement, Shebalinsky District, the Altai Republic, Russia. The population was 301 as of 2016. There are 6 streets.

== Geography ==
Uluscherga is located 49 km northwest of Shebalino (the district's administrative centre) by road. Cherga is the nearest rural locality.
