= Kaysyn =

Kaysyn Кайсын
- Selo
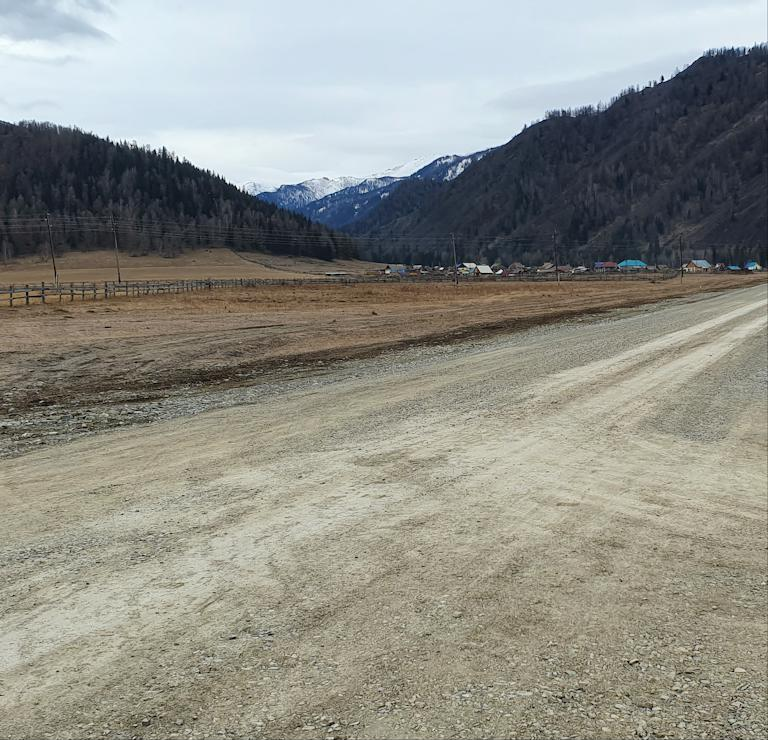
- Village of Kaïsyne in the Altai Republic.

- Location within Altai Republic Location within Russia
- Coordinates: 50°57′N 84°35′E
- Country: Russia
- Region: Altai Republic
- District: Ust-Kansky District
- Time zone: UTC+7:00

Kaysyn (Russian: Кайсын; Altay: Кайсын, Kaysın) is a rural locality (a selo) in Ust-Kansky District, the Altai Republic, Russia. The population was 244 as of 2016. There are 3 streets.

== Geography ==
Kaysyn is located 13 km west of Ust-Kan (the district's administrative centre) by road. Kozul is the nearest rural locality.
