= Nizhnyaya Talda =

Nizhnyaya Talda Нижняя Талда
- Selo
- Flag

- Location within Altai Republic Location within Russia
- Coordinates: 50°51′N 85°58′E
- Country: Russia
- Region: Altai Republic
- District: Ongudaysky District
- Time zone: UTC+7:00

Nizhnyaya Talda (Russian: Нижняя Талда; Altay: Алтыгы Талду, Altıgı Taldu) is a rural locality (a selo) in Ongudaysky District, the Altai Republic, Russia. The population was 509 as of 2016. There are 4 streets.

== Geography ==
Nizhnyaya Talda is located 21 km northwest of Onguday (the district's administrative centre) by road. Kurota is the nearest rural locality.
