= Kayashkan =

Kayashkan Каяшкан
- Selo
- Location within Altai Republic Location within Russia
- Coordinates: 52°22′N 87°21′E
- Country: Russia
- Region: Altai Republic
- District: Turochaksky District
- Time zone: UTC+7:00

Kayashkan (Russian: Каяшкан; Altay: Кайашкан, Kayaşkan) is a rural locality (a selo) in Turochaksky District, the Altai Republic, Russia. The population was 138 as of 2016. There are 3 streets.

== Geography ==
Kayashkan is located 26 km northeast of Turochak (the district's administrative centre) by road. Turochak is the nearest rural locality.
