= Neftebaza, Altai Republic =

Neftebaza Нефтебаза
- Selo
- Location within Altai Republic Location within Russia
- Coordinates: 50°51′N 85°49′E
- Country: Russia
- Region: Altai Republic
- District: Ongudaysky District
- Time zone: UTC+7:00

Neftebaza (Russian: Нефтебаза) is a rural locality (a selo) in Ongudaysky District, the Altai Republic, Russia. The population was 62 as of 2016. There is 1 street.

== Geography ==
Neftebaza is located 26 km northwest of Onguday (the district's administrative centre) by road. Tuyekta and Talda are the nearest rural localities.
