= Tuguryuk =

Tuguryuk Тюгурюк
- Settlement
- Location within Altai Republic Location within Russia
- Coordinates: 50°18′N 85°24′E
- Country: Russia
- Region: Altai Republic
- District: Ust-Koksinsky District
- Time zone: UTC+7:00

Tuguryuk (Russian: Тюгурюк; Altay: Тӧгӧрик, Tögörik) is a rural locality (a settlement) in Ust-Koksinsky District, the Altai Republic, Russia. The population was 334 as of 2016. There are 11 streets.

== Geography ==
Tuguryuk is located 20 km northwest of Ust-Koksa (the district's administrative centre) by road. Siny Yar is the nearest rural locality.
