= Kuzya =

Kuzya Кузя
- Village
- Location within Altai Republic Location within Russia
- Coordinates: 51°45′N 86°43′E
- Country: Russia
- Region: Altai Republic
- District: Choysky District
- Time zone: UTC+7:00

Kuzya (Russian: Кузя) is a rural locality (a selo) in Karakokshinskoye Rural Settlement of Choysky District, the Altai Republic, Russia. The population was 41 as of 2016. There are 9 streets.

== Geography ==
Kuzya is located southeast of Gorno-Altaysk, in the valley of the Kuzya River, 47 km south of Choya (the district's administrative centre) by road. Karakoksha is the nearest rural locality.
