= Margala, Altai Republic =

Margala Маргала
- Settlement
- Location within Altai Republic Location within Russia
- Coordinates: 50°15′N 86°00′E
- Country: Russia
- Region: Altai Republic
- District: Ust-Koksinsky District
- Time zone: UTC+7:00

Margala (Russian: Маргала; Altay: Маргалу, Margalu) is a rural locality (a settlement) in Ust-Koksinsky District, the Altai Republic, Russia. The population was 122 as of 2016. There are 4 streets.

== Geography ==
Margala is located 33 km southeast of Ust-Koksa (the district's administrative centre) by road. Chendek is the nearest rural locality.
