= Mukhor-Tarkhata =

Mukhor-Tarkhata Мухор-Тархата
- Village
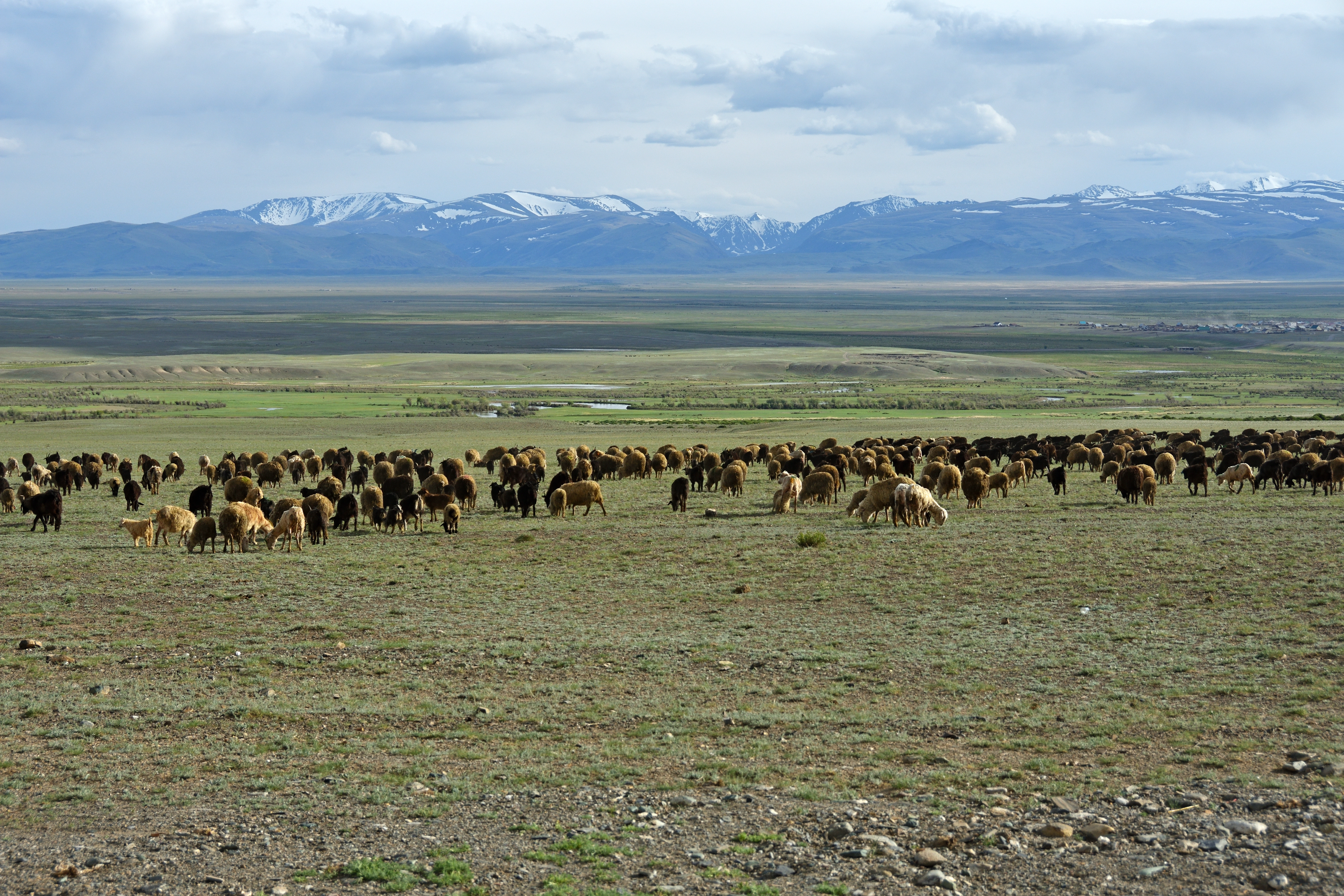
- The village is in the background

- Location within Altai Republic Location within Russia
- Coordinates: 49°59′N 88°31′E
- Country: Russia
- Region: Altai Republic
- District: Kosh-Agachsky District
- Time zone: UTC+7:00

Mukhor-Tarkhata (Russian: Мухор-Тархата; Altay: Мукур-Тархаты, Mukur-Tarhatı) is a rural locality (a selo) in Mukhor-Tarkhatinskoye Rural Settlement of Kosh-Agachsky District, the Altai Republic, Russia. The population was 807 as of 2016. There are 9 streets.

== Geography ==
Mukhor-Tarkhata is located at the confluence of the Kok-Ozek River in Choi, 13 km west of Kosh-Agach (the district's administrative centre) by road. Kosh-Agach is the nearest rural locality.
