= Kastakha =

Kastakha Кастахта
- Selo
- Location within Altai Republic Location within Russia
- Coordinates: 50°19′N 85°44′E
- Country: Russia
- Region: Altai Republic
- District: Ust-Koksinsky District
- Time zone: UTC+7:00

Kastakha (Russian: Кастахта; Altay: Кастакту, Kastaktu) is a rural locality (a selo) in Ust-Koksinsky District, the Altai Republic, Russia. The population was 137 as of 2016. There are 3 streets.

== Geography ==
Kastakha is located 12 km northeast of Ust-Koksa (the district's administrative centre) by road. Kurunda is the nearest rural locality.
