= Maralovodka =

Maralovodka Мараловодка
- Settlement
- Location within Altai Republic Location within Russia
- Coordinates: 50°07′N 85°27′E
- Country: Russia
- Region: Altai Republic
- District: Ust-Koksinsky District
- Time zone: UTC+7:00

Maralovodka (Russian: Мараловодка; Altay: Алтыгы-Кубее, Altıgı-Kubeye) is a rural locality (a settlement) in Ust-Koksinsky District, the Altai Republic, Russia. The population was 232 as of 2016. There are 6 streets.

== Geography ==
Maralovodka is located 25 km southwest of Ust-Koksa (the district's administrative centre) by road. Kaytanak is the nearest rural locality.
