= Kozul, Altai Republic =

Kozul Козуль
- Selo
- Location within Altai Republic Location within Russia
- Coordinates: 50°58′N 84°41′E
- Country: Russia
- Region: Altai Republic
- District: Ust-Kansky District
- Time zone: UTC+7:00

Kozul (Russian: Козуль; Altay: Кӧзӱл, Közül) is a rural locality (a selo) and the administrative centre of Kozulskoye Rural Settlement, Ust-Kansky District, the Altai Republic, Russia. The population was 501 as of 2016. There are 6 streets.

== Geography ==
Kozul is located 10 km southeast of Ust-Kan (the district's administrative centre) by road. Kaysyn and Ust-Kan are the nearest rural localities.
