= Talda, Ust-Koksinsky District, Altai Republic =

Talda Талда
- Selo
- Location within Altai Republic Location within Russia
- Coordinates: 50°30′N 85°01′E
- Country: Russia
- Region: Altai Republic
- District: Ust-Koksinsky District
- Time zone: UTC+7:00

Talda (Russian: Талда; Altay: Талду, Taldu) is a rural locality (a selo) and the administrative centre of Taldinskoye Rural Settlement, Ust-Koksinsky District, the Altai Republic, Russia. The population was 706 as of 2016. There are 9 streets.

== Geography ==
Talda is located 61 km northwest of Ust-Koksa (the district's administrative centre) by road. Abay and Sugash are the nearest rural localities.
