= Yakonur =

Yakonur Яконур
- Village
- Location within Altai Republic Location within Russia
- Coordinates: 51°02′N 84°52′E
- Country: Russia
- Region: Altai Republic
- District: Ust-Kansky District
- Time zone: UTC+7:00

Yakonur (Russian: Яконур; Altay: Экинур, Ekinur) is a rural locality (a selo) in Ust-Kansky District, the Altai Republic, Russia. The population was 1699 as of 2016. There are 10 streets.

== Geography ==
Yakonur is located 17 km northeast of Ust-Kan (the district's administrative centre) by road. Ust-Kan is the nearest rural locality.
