= Kamlak (rural locality) =

Kamlak Камлак
- Village
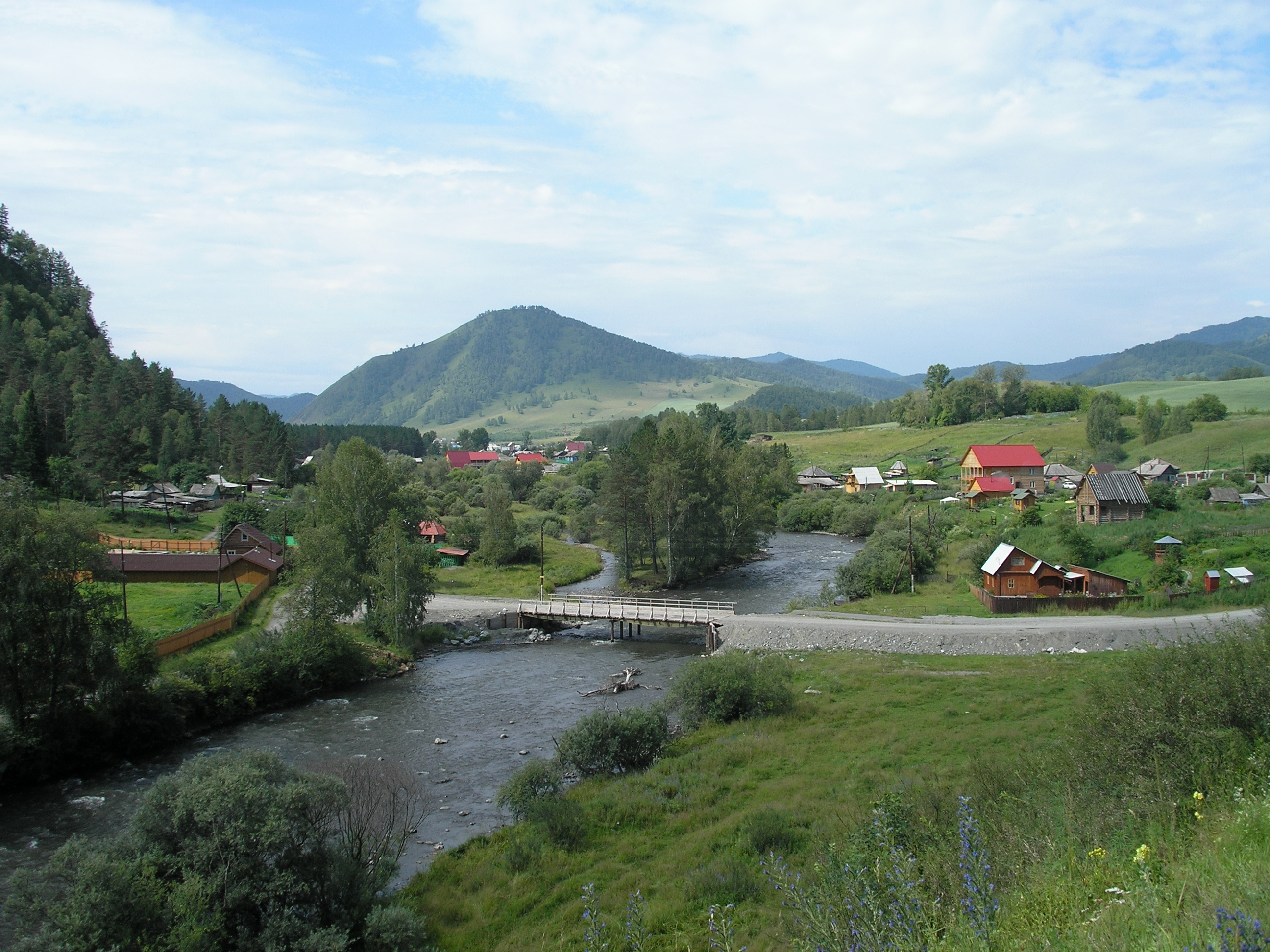
- Village of Kamlak

- Location within Altai Republic Location within Russia
- Coordinates: 51°37′N 85°40′E
- Country: Russia
- Region: Altai Republic
- District: Shebalinsky District
- Time zone: UTC+7:00

Kamlak (Russian: Камлак; Altay: Камлак) is a rural locality (a selo) and the administrative centre of Kamlakskoye Rural Settlement of Shebalinsky District, the Altai Republic, Russia. The population was 572 as of 2016. There are 7 streets.

== Geography ==
Kamlak is located at the confluence of the Kamlak River in Sema River, 46 km north of Shebalino (the district's administrative centre) by road. Ust-Sema is the nearest rural locality.
