= Aleksandrovka, Altai Republic =

Aleksandrovka Александровка
- Village
- Location within Altai Republic Location within Russia
- Coordinates: 51°44′N 86°06′E
- Country: Russia
- Region: Altai Republic
- District: Mayminsky District
- Time zone: UTC+7:00

Aleksandrovka (Russian: Александровка; Altay: Эмери, Emeri) is a rural locality (a selo) in Biryulinskoye Rural Settlement of Mayminsky District, the Altai Republic, Russia. The population was 314 as of 2016. There are 3 streets.

== Geography ==
Aleksandrovka is located in the valley of the Mayma River, 40 km south of Mayma (the district's administrative centre) by road. Sredny Saydys is the nearest rural locality.
