= Ust-Kumir =

Ust-Kumir Усть-Кумир
- Selo
- Location within Altai Republic Location within Russia
- Coordinates: 51°01′N 84°17′E
- Country: Russia
- Region: Altai Republic
- District: Ust-Kansky District
- Time zone: UTC+7:00

Ust-Kumir (Russian: Усть-Кумир; Altay: Кайрукун, Kayrukun) is a rural locality (a selo) and the administrative centre of Talitskoye Rural Settlement, Ust-Kansky District, the Altai Republic, Russia. The population was 501 as of 2016. There are 11 streets.

== Geography ==
Ust-Kumir is located 38 km northwest of Ust-Kan (the district's administrative centre) by road. Talitsa is the nearest rural locality.
