= Aktal =

Aktal Актал
- Selo
- Location within Altai Republic Location within Russia
- Coordinates: 49°55′N 88°53′E
- Country: Russia
- Region: Altai Republic
- District: Kosh-Agachsky District
- Time zone: UTC+7:00

Aktal (Russian: Актал; Altay: Ак-Тал, Ak-Tal) is a rural locality (a selo) in Kazakhskoye Rural Settlement of Kosh-Agachsky District, the Altai Republic, Russia. The population was 3 as of 2016.

== Geography ==
Aktal is located 20 km southeast of Kosh-Agach (the district's administrative centre) by road. Kokorya is the nearest rural locality.
