= Vlasyevo =

Vlasyevo Власьево
- Selo
- Location within Altai Republic Location within Russia
- Coordinates: 50°17′N 85°30′E
- Country: Russia
- Region: Altai Republic
- District: Ust-Koksinsky District
- Time zone: UTC+7:00

Vlasyevo (Russian: Власьево; Altay: Ылгаксы, Ilgaksı) is a rural locality (a selo) in Ust-Koksinsky District, the Altai Republic, Russia. The population was 11 as of 2016. There is 1 street.

== Geography ==
Vlasyevo is located 10 km northwest of Ust-Koksa (the district's administrative centre) by road. Ust-Koksa is the nearest rural locality.
