= Maly Yaloman =

Maly Yaloman Малый Яломан
- Selo
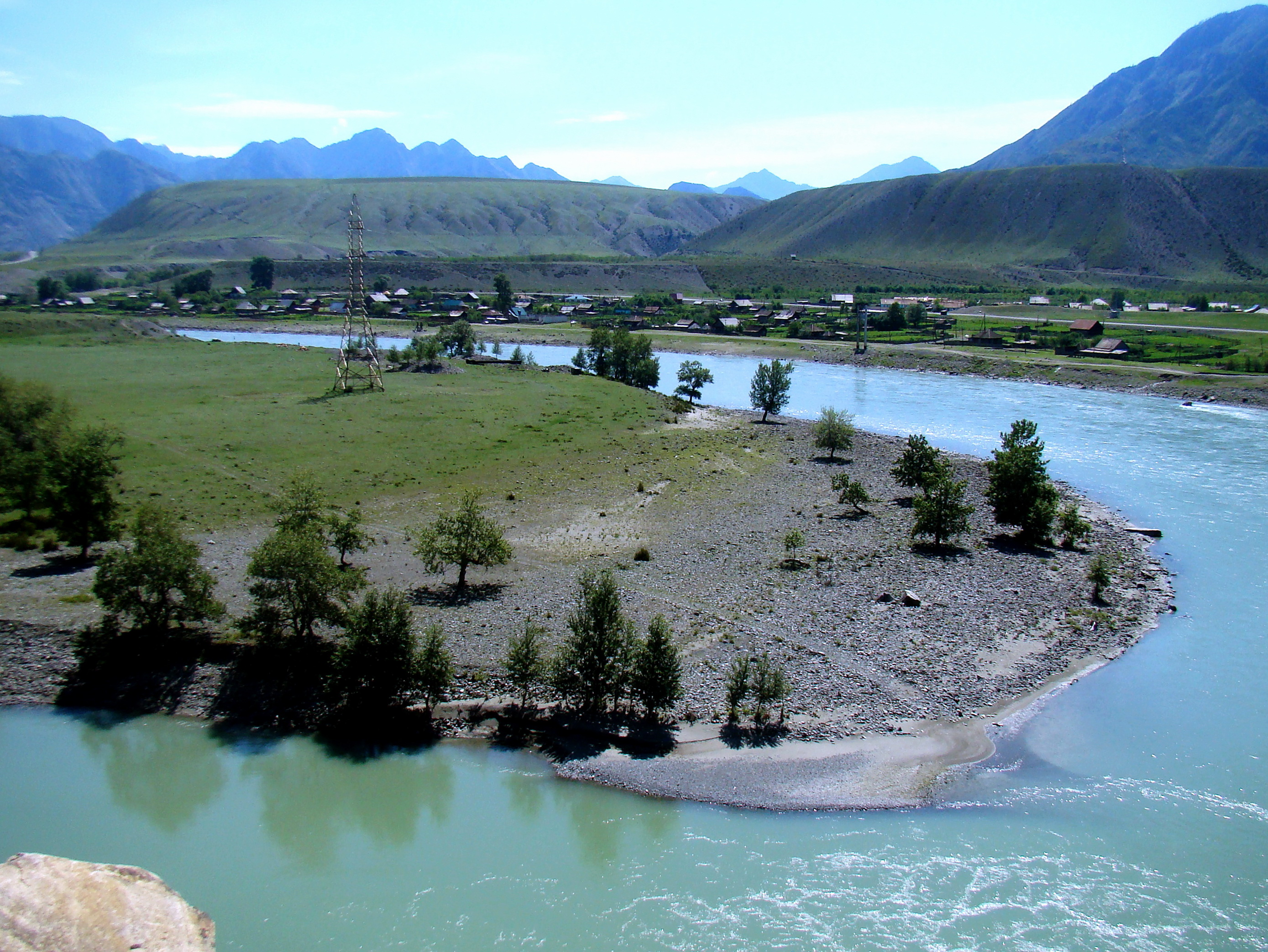
- View of the settlement with the Katun river

- Location within Altai Republic Location within Russia
- Coordinates: 50°29′N 86°34′E
- Country: Russia
- Region: Altai Republic
- District: Ongudaysky District
- Time zone: UTC+7:00

Maly Yaloman (Russian: Малый Яломан; Altay: Кыҥыраар, Kıñıraar) is a rural locality (a selo) in Ongudaysky District, the Altai Republic, Russia. The population was 219 as of 2016. There are 4 streets.

== Geography ==
Maly Yaloman is located 60 km southeast of Onguday (the district's administrative centre) by road. Inya is the nearest rural locality.
