= Shashikman =

Shashikman Шашикман
- Selo
- Location within Altai Republic Location within Russia
- Coordinates: 50°47′N 86°03′E
- Country: Russia
- Region: Altai Republic
- District: Ongudaysky District
- Time zone: UTC+7:00

Shashikman (Russian: Шашикман; Altay: Шашыкман, Şaşıkman) is a rural locality (a selo) and the administrative centre of Shashikmanskoye Rural Settlement, Ongudaysky District, the Altai Republic, Russia. The population was 691 as of 2016. There are 8 streets.

== Geography ==
Shashikman is located 8 km northwest of Onguday (the district's administrative centre) by road. Onguday is the nearest rural locality.
