= Verkh-Cherga =

Verkh-Cherga Верх-Черга
- Selo
- Location within Altai Republic Location within Russia
- Coordinates: 51°22′N 85°27′E
- Country: Russia
- Region: Altai Republic
- District: Shebalinsky District
- Time zone: UTC+7:00

Verkh-Cherga (Russian: Верх-Черга; Altay: Јаан Чаргы, Ĵaan Çargı) is a rural locality (a selo) in Shebalinsky District, the Altai Republic, Russia. The population was 211 as of 2016. There are 4 streets.

== Geography ==
Verkh-Cherga is located 27 km northwest of Shebalino (the district's administrative centre) by road. Malaya Cherga is the nearest rural locality.
