= Topuchaya =

Topuchaya Топучая
- Village
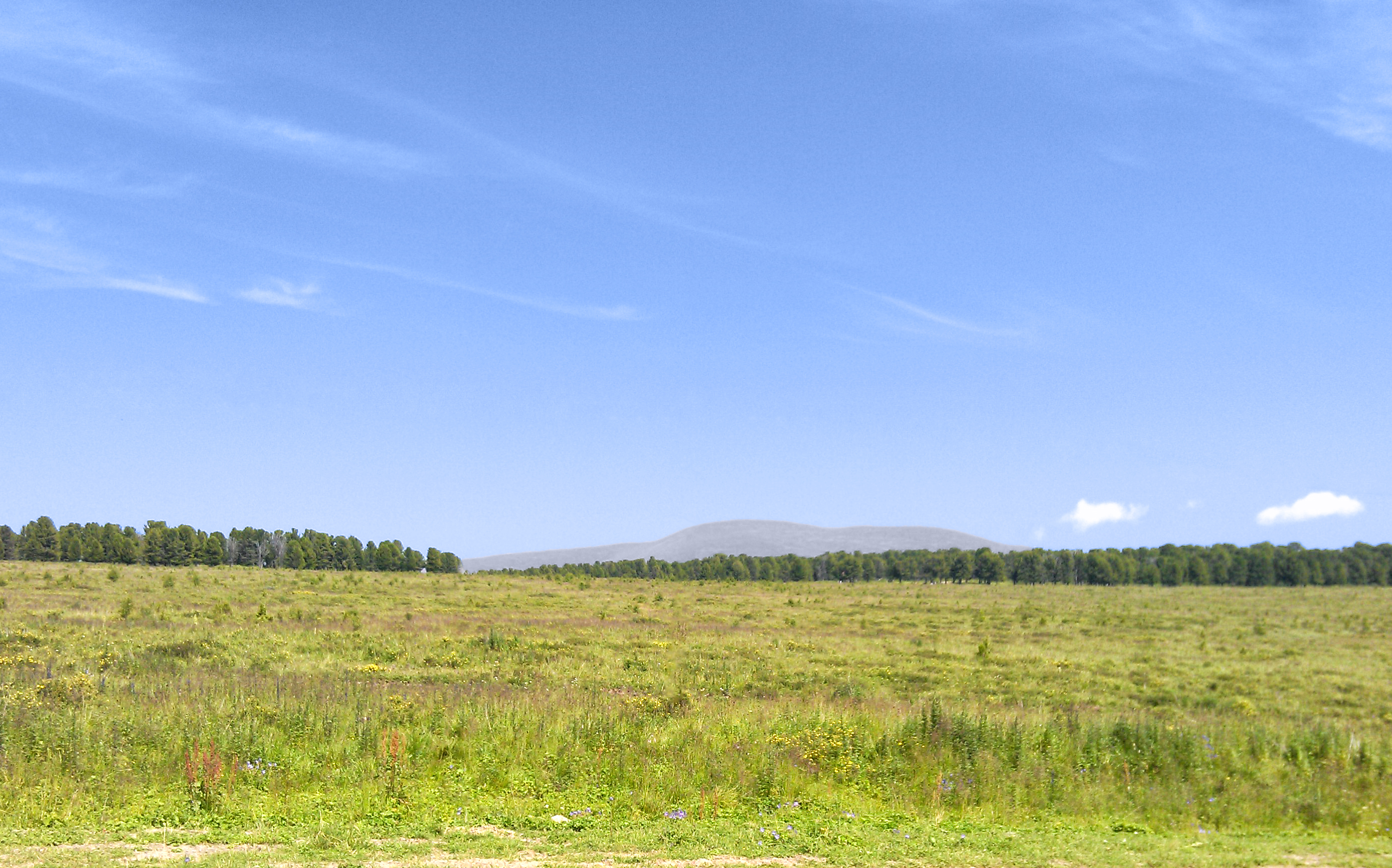
- Fields just outside the village

- Location within Altai Republic Location within Russia
- Coordinates: 51°07′N 85°35′E
- Country: Russia
- Region: Altai Republic
- District: Shebalinsky District
- Time zone: UTC+7:00

Topuchaya (Russian: Топучая; Altay: Топучий, Topuçiy) is a rural locality (a selo) in Dyektiyekskoye Rural Settlement of Shebalinsky District, the Altai Republic, Russia. The population was 194 as of 2016. There are 2 streets.

== Geography ==
Topuchaya is located 21 km south of Shebalino (the district's administrative centre) by road. Kumalyr is the nearest rural locality.
