= Verkh-Anuy =

Verkh-Anuy Верх-Ануй
- Selo
- Location within Altai Republic Location within Russia
- Coordinates: 51°08′N 84°58′E
- Country: Russia
- Region: Altai Republic
- District: Ust-Kansky District
- Time zone: UTC+7:00

Verkh-Anuy (Russian: Верх-Ануй; Altay: Јалаҥый-Бажы, Ĵalañıy-Bajı) is a rural locality (a selo) in Ust-Kansky District, the Altai Republic, Russia. The population was 331 as of 2016. There are 2 streets.

== Geography ==
Verkh-Anuy is located 39 km northeast of Ust-Kan (the district's administrative centre) by road. Bely Anuy is the nearest rural locality.
