= Siny Yar =

Siny Yar Синий Яр
- Selo
- Location within Altai Republic Location within Russia
- Coordinates: 50°17′N 85°26′E
- Country: Russia
- Region: Altai Republic
- District: Ust-Koksinsky District
- Time zone: UTC+7:00

Siny Yar (Russian: Синий Яр; Altay: Кӧк-Јар, Kök-Ĵar) is a rural locality (a selo) in Ust-Koksinsky District, the Altai Republic, Russia. The population was 6 as of 2016. There is 1 street.

== Geography ==
Siny Yar is located 16 km west of Ust-Koksa (the district's administrative centre) by road. Tyuguryuk is the nearest rural locality.
