= Kara-Kudyur =

Kara-Kudyur Кара-Кудюр
- Selo
- Location within Altai Republic Location within Russia
- Coordinates: 50°40′N 87°49′E
- Country: Russia
- Region: Altai Republic
- District: Ulagansky District
- Time zone: UTC+7:00

Kara-Kudyur (Russian: Кара-Кудюр; Altay: Кара-Кујур, Kara-Kuĵur) is a rural locality (a selo) in Ulagansky District, the Altai Republic, Russia. The population was 344 as of 2016. There are 4 streets.

== Geography ==
Kara-Kudyur is located 13 km northwest of Ulagan (the district's administrative centre) by road. Chibilya is the nearest rural locality.
