= Kucherla =

Kucherla Кучерла
- Settlement
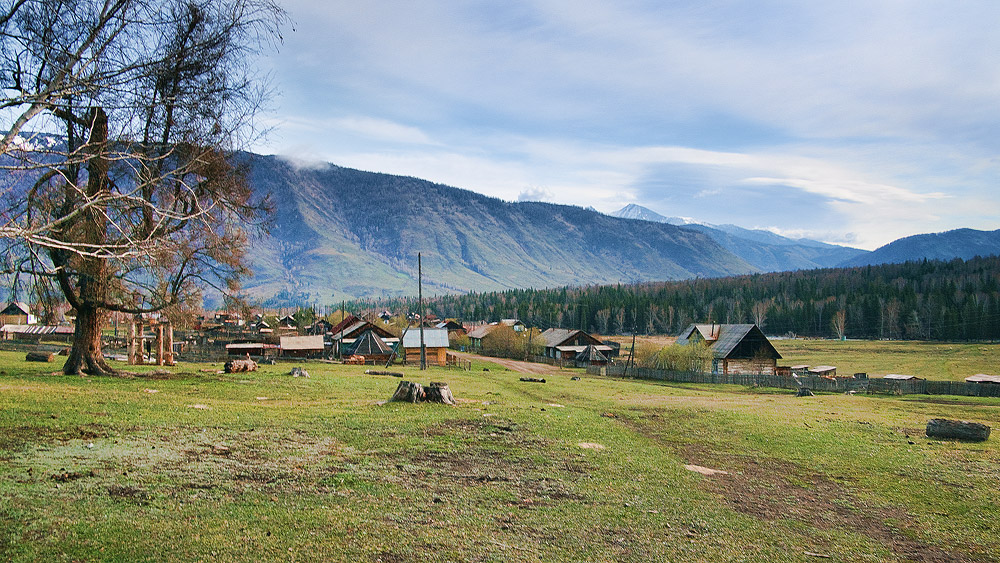

- Location within Altai Republic Location within Russia
- Coordinates: 50°08′N 86°19′E
- Country: Russia
- Region: Altai Republic
- District: Ust-Koksinsky District
- Time zone: UTC+7:00

Kucherla (Russian: Кучерла; Altay: Кујурлу, Kuĵurlu) is a rural locality (a settlement) in Katandinskoye Rural Settlement of Ust-Koksinsky District, the Altai Republic, Russia. The population was 185 as of 2016. There are 7 streets.

== Geography ==
Kucherla is located on the left bank of the Kucherla River, 62 km southeast of Ust-Koksa (the district's administrative centre) by road. Tyungur is the nearest rural locality.
