= Ognyovka =

Ognyovka Огнёвка
- Selo
- Location within Altai Republic Location within Russia
- Coordinates: 50°13′N 85°31′E
- Country: Russia
- Region: Altai Republic
- District: Ust-Koksinsky District

Population (2016)
  - Total: 634
- Time zone: UTC+7:00

Ognyovka (Russian: Огнёвка; Altay: Соору, Sooru) is a rural locality (a selo) and the administrative centre of Ognyovskoye Rural Settlement, Ust-Koksinsky District, the Altai Republic, Russia. It consists of 11 streets.

== Geography ==
Ognyovka is located 10 km southwest of Ust-Koksa (the district's administrative centre) by road. Beryozovka is the nearest rural locality.
