= Tikhonkaya =

Tikhonkaya Тихонькая
- Selo
- Location within Altai Republic Location within Russia
- Coordinates: 50°12′N 85°47′E
- Country: Russia
- Region: Altai Republic
- District: Ust-Koksinsky District
- Time zone: UTC+7:00

Tikhonkaya (Russian: Тихонькая; Altay: Басты-Кем, Bastı-Kem) is a rural locality (a selo) in Ust-Koksinsky District, the Altai Republic, Russia. The population was 439 as of 2016. There are 9 streets.

== Geography ==
Tikhonkaya is located 19 kilometres (12 mi) southeast of Ust-Koksa (the district's administrative centre) by road. Verkh-Uymon and Gorbunovo are the nearest rural localities.
