= Shirgaytu =

Shirgaytu Шыргайту
- Selo
- Location within Altai Republic Location within Russia
- Coordinates: 51°12′N 85°17′E
- Country: Russia
- Region: Altai Republic
- District: Shebalinsky District
- Time zone: UTC+7:00

Shirgaytu (Russian: Шыргайту; Altay: Шыргайты, Şırgaytı) is a rural locality (a selo) in Shebalinsky District, the Altai Republic, Russia. The population was 511 as of 2016. There are 10 streets.

== Geography ==
Shirgaytu is located 104 km southwest of Shebalino (the district's administrative centre) by road. Baragash is the nearest rural locality.
