= Telengit-Sortogoy, Altai Republic =

Telengit-Sortogoy Теленгит-Сортогой
- Village
- Location within Altai Republic Location within Russia
- Coordinates: 50°00′N 88°44′E
- Country: Russia
- Region: Altai Republic
- District: Kosh-Agachsky District
- Time zone: UTC+7:00

Telengit-Sortogoy (Russian: Теленгит-Сортогой; Altay: Телеҥит-Сары Токой, Teleñit-Sarı Tokoy) is a rural locality (a selo) and the administrative centre of Telengit-Sortogoysky Rural Settlement of Kosh-Agachsky District, the Altai Republic, Russia. The population was 605 as of 2016. There are 8 streets.

== Geography ==
Telengit-Sortogoy is located in the south-east of the Altai Republic, in the north of the central part of the Kosh-Agach region, 9 km northeast of Kosh-Agach (the district's administrative centre) by road. Kosh-Agach is the nearest rural locality.
