= Biryulya =

Biryulya Бирюля
- Village
- Location within Altai Republic Location within Russia
- Coordinates: 51°46′N 86°03′E
- Country: Russia
- Region: Altai Republic
- District: Mayminsky District
- Time zone: UTC+7:00

Biryulya (Russian: Бирюля; Altay: Билӱлӱ, Bilülü) is a rural locality (a selo) and the administrative centre of Biryulinskoye Rural Settlement of Mayminsky District, the Altai Republic, Russia. The population was 727 as of 2016. There are 18 streets.

== Geography ==
Biryulya is located in the valley of the Mayma River, 33 km southeast of Mayma (the district's administrative centre) by road. Alexandrovka is the nearest rural locality.
