= Arbayta =

Arbayta Арбайта
- Selo
- Location within Altai Republic Location within Russia
- Coordinates: 51°19′N 85°36′E
- Country: Russia
- Region: Altai Republic
- District: Shebalinsky District
- Time zone: UTC+7:00

Arbayta (Russian: Арбайта; Altay: Арбайты, Arbaytı) is a rural locality (a selo) in Shebalinsky District, the Altai Republic, Russia. The population was 40 as of 2016. There are 8 streets.

== Geography ==
Arbayta is located 16 km northwest of Shebalino (the district's administrative centre) by road. Dyektiyek is the nearest rural locality.
