= Syoyka =

Syoyka Сёйка
- Village
- Location within Altai Republic Location within Russia
- Coordinates: 51°53′N 86°44′E
- Country: Russia
- Region: Altai Republic
- District: Choysky District
- Time zone: UTC+7:00

Syoyka (Russian: Сёйка; Altay: Соой, Sooy) is a rural locality (a selo) in Choyskoye Rural Settlement of Choysky District, the Altai Republic, Russia. The population was 1,520 as of 2016. There are 16 streets.

== Geography ==
Syoyka is located on the Seyka River, 27 km southeast of Choya (the district's administrative centre) by road. Ynyrga is the nearest rural locality.
