= Baragash =

Baragash Барагаш
- Selo
- Location within Altai Republic Location within Russia
- Coordinates: 51°16′N 85°11′E
- Country: Russia
- Region: Altai Republic
- District: Shebalinsky District
- Time zone: UTC+7:00

Baragash (Russian: Барагаш; Altay: Барагаш, Baragaş) is a rural locality (a selo) in Shebalinsky District, the Altai Republic, Russia. The population was 760 as of 2016. There are 11 streets.

== Geography ==
Baragash is located 94 km west of Shebalino (the district's administrative centre) by road. Shyrgaytu is the nearest rural locality.
