= Polevodka =

Polevodka Полеводка
- Settlement
- Location within Altai Republic Location within Russia
- Coordinates: 50°13′N 85°59′E
- Country: Russia
- Region: Altai Republic
- District: Ust-Koksinsky District
- Time zone: UTC+7:00

Polevodka (Russian: Полеводка; Altay: Ӱстӱги-Кӱбее, Üstügi-Kübeye) is a rural locality (a settlement) in Ust-Koksinsky District, the Altai Republic, Russia. The population was 83 as of 2016. There are 3 streets.

== Geography ==
Polevodka is located 29 km southeast of Ust-Koksa (the district's administrative centre) by road. Margala is the nearest rural locality.
