= Talda =

Talda Талда
- Selo
- Location within Altai Republic Location within Russia
- Coordinates: 50°50′N 85°46′E
- Country: Russia
- Region: Altai Republic
- District: Ongudaysky District
- Time zone: UTC+7:00

Talda (Russian: Талда; Altay: Талду, Taldu) is a rural locality (a selo) in Ongudaysky District, the Altai Republic, Russia. The population was 98 as of 2016. There is 1 street.

== Geography ==
Talda is located 32 km northwest of Onguday (the district's administrative centre) by road. Shiba is the nearest rural locality.
