= Nizhny Uymon =

Nizhny Uymon Нижний Уймон
- Selo
- Location within Altai Republic Location within Russia
- Coordinates: 50°12′N 85°55′E
- Country: Russia
- Region: Altai Republic
- District: Ust-Koksinsky District
- Time zone: UTC+7:00

Nizhny Uymon (Russian: Нижний Уймон; Altay: Алтыгы-Оймон, Altıgı-Oymon) is a rural locality (a selo) in Ust-Koksinsky District, the Altai Republic, Russia. The population was 165 as of 2016. There are 4 streets.

== Geography ==
Nizhny Uymon is located 25 km southeast of Ust-Koksa (the district's administrative centre) by road. Multa and Zamulta are the nearest rural localities.
