= Sugash =

Sugash Сугаш
- Selo
- Location within Altai Republic Location within Russia
- Coordinates: 50°33′N 84°57′E
- Country: Russia
- Region: Altai Republic
- District: Ust-Koksinsky District
- Time zone: UTC+7:00

Sugash (Russian: Сугаш; Altay: Сугаш, Sugaş) is a rural locality (a selo) in Ust-Koksinsky District, the Altai Republic, Russia. The population was 521 as of 2016. There are 10 streets.

== Geography ==
Sugash is located 68 km northwest of Ust-Koksa (the district's administrative centre) by road. Talda is the nearest rural locality.
