= Tyudrala =

Tyudrala Тюдрала
- Selo
- Location within Altai Republic Location within Russia
- Coordinates: 50°59′N 84°29′E
- Country: Russia
- Region: Altai Republic
- District: Ust-Kansky District
- Time zone: UTC+7:00

Tyudrala (Russian: Тюдрала; Altay: Јодралу, Ĵodralu) is a rural locality (a selo) in Ust-Kansky District, the Altai Republic, Russia. The population was 289 as of 2016. There are 3 streets.

== Geography ==
Tyudrala is located 22 km northwest of Ust-Kan (the district's administrative centre) by road. Kaysyn is the nearest rural locality.
