= Dyektiyek =

Dyektiyek Дъектиек
- Selo
- Location within Altai Republic Location within Russia
- Coordinates: 51°16′N 85°36′E
- Country: Russia
- Region: Altai Republic
- District: Shebalinsky District
- Time zone: UTC+7:00

Dyektiyek (Russian: Дъектиек; Altay: Јекјийек, Ĵekĵiyek) is a rural locality (a selo) and the administrative centre of Dyektiyeksky Rural Settlement, Shebalinsky District, the Altai Republic, Russia. The population was 593 as of 2016. There are 18 streets.

== Geography ==
Dyektiyek is located 7 km southwest of Shebalino (the district's administrative centre) by road. Shebalino is the nearest rural locality.
