= Yabogan =

Yabogan Ябоган
- Village
- Location within Altai Republic Location within Russia
- Coordinates: 50°54′N 85°04′E
- Country: Russia
- Region: Altai Republic
- District: Ust-Kansky District
- Time zone: UTC+7:00

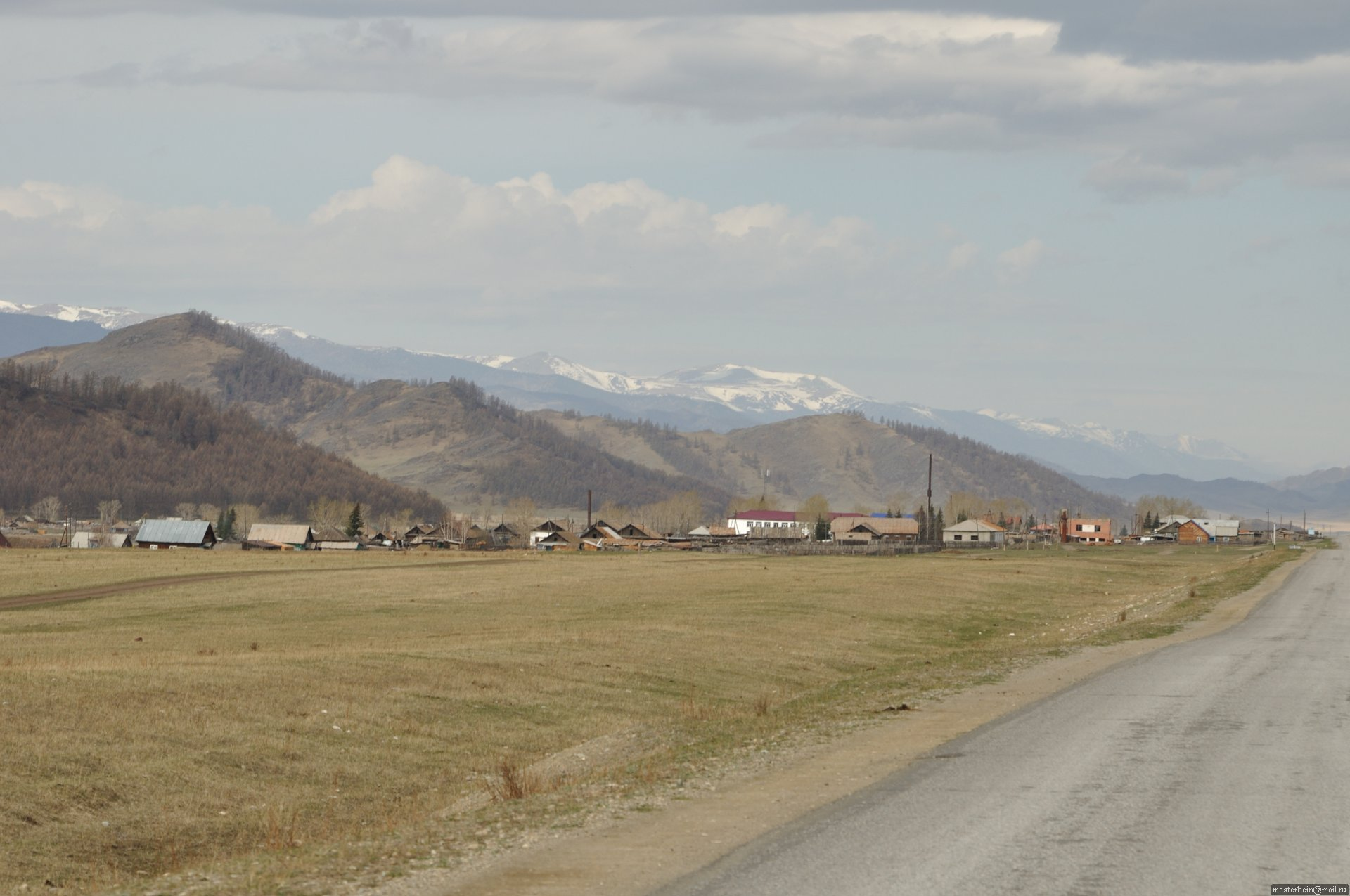
Yabogan village in Altai region

Yabogan (Russian: Ябоган; Altay: Јабаган, Ĵabagan) is a rural locality (a selo) and the administrative centre of Yaboganskoye Rural Settlement of Ust-Kansky District, the Altai Republic, Russia. The population was 1368 as of 2016. There are 9 streets.

== Geography ==
Yabogan is located 26 km east of Ust-Kan (the district's administrative centre) by road. Verkhny Yabogan is the nearest rural locality.
