= Sukhoy Karasuk =

Sukhoy Karasuk Сухой Карасук
- Village
- Location within Altai Republic Location within Russia
- Coordinates: 51°54′N 86°12′E
- Country: Russia
- Region: Altai Republic
- District: Choysky District
- Time zone: UTC+7:00

Sukhoy Karasuk (Russian: Сухой Карасук; Altay: Соок-Карасуу, Sook-Karasuu) is a rural locality (a selo) in Paspaulskoye Rural Settlement of Choysky District, the Altai Republic, Russia. The population was 3 as of 2016. There are 4 streets.

== Geography ==
Sukhoy Karasuk is located 33 km southwest of Choya (the district's administrative centre) by road. Sugul is the nearest rural locality.
