= Stary Kebezen =

Stary Kebezen Старый Кебезень
- Selo
- Location within Altai Republic Location within Russia
- Coordinates: 51°54′N 87°06′E
- Country: Russia
- Region: Altai Republic
- District: Turochaksky District
- Time zone: UTC+7:00

Stary Kebezen (Russian: Старый Кебезень; Altay: Эски Кебезен, Eski Kebezen) is a rural locality (a selo) in Turochaksky District, the Altai Republic, Russia. The population was 149 as of 2016. There are 4 streets.

== Geography ==
Stary Kebezen is located 50 km south of Turochak (the district's administrative centre) by road. Kebezen is the nearest rural locality.
