= Turbaza "Yunost" =

Turbaza "Yunost" Турбаза «Юность»
- Settlement
- Location within Altai Republic Location within Russia
- Coordinates: 51°52′N 85°48′E
- Country: Russia
- Region: Altai Republic
- District: Mayminsky District
- Time zone: UTC+7:00

Turbaza "Yunost" (Russian: Турбаза «Юность») is a rural locality (a selo) in Souzginskoye Rural Settlement of Mayminsky District, the Altai Republic, Russia. The population was 52 as of 2016.

== Geography ==
Turbaza "Yunost" is located on the Katun River, 26 km south of Mayma (the district's administrative centre) by road. Cheremshanka is the nearest rural locality.
