= Tuloy =

Tuloy Тулой
- Selo
- Location within Altai Republic Location within Russia
- Coordinates: 52°00′N 87°07′E
- Country: Russia
- Region: Altai Republic
- District: Turochaksky District
- Time zone: UTC+7:00

Tuloy (Russian: Тулой; Altay: Толый, Tolıy) is a rural locality (a selo) in Turochaksky District, the Altai Republic, Russia. The population was 196 as of 2016. There are 5 streets.

== Geography ==
Tuloy is located 35 km south of Turochak (the district's administrative centre) by road. Verkh-Biysk is the nearest rural locality.
