= Kurmach-Baygol =

Kurmach-Baygol Курмач-Байгол
- Village
- Location within Altai Republic Location within Russia
- Coordinates: 52°07′N 87°39′E
- Country: Russia
- Region: Altai Republic
- District: Turochaksky District
- Time zone: UTC+7:00

Kurmach-Baygol (Russian: Курмач-Байгол; Altay: Курмач-Байгол, Kurmaç-Baygol) is a rural locality (a selo) and the administrative centre of Kurmach-Baygolskoye Rural Settlement of Turochaksky District, the Altai Republic, Russia. The population was 211 as of 2016. There are 2 streets.

== Geography ==
Kurmach-Baygol is located on the left bank of the Baygol River, 101 km southeast of Turochak (the district's administrative centre) by road. Biyka is the nearest rural locality.
