= Korgon, Altai Republic =

Korgon Коргон
- Selo
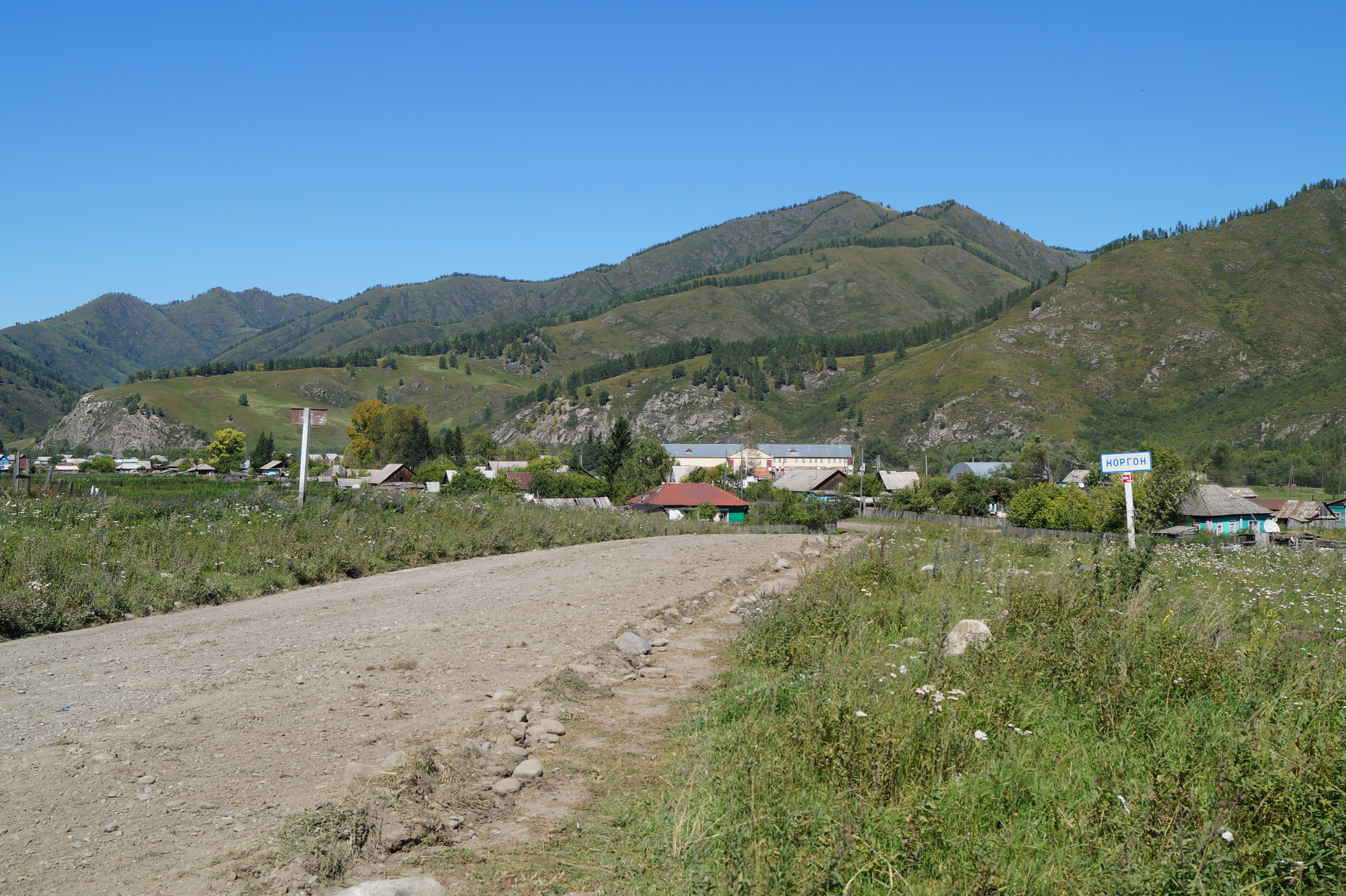
- View of Korgon

- Location within Altai Republic Location within Russia
- Coordinates: 51°05′N 84°02′E
- Country: Russia
- Region: Altai Republic
- District: Ust-Kansky District
- Time zone: UTC+7:00

Korgon (Russian: Коргон; Altay: Коргон, romanized: Qorğon) is a rural locality (a selo) and the administrative centre of Korgonskoye Rural Settlement, Ust-Kansky District, the Altai Republic, Russia. The population was 333 as of 2016. There are 3 streets.

== Geography ==
Korgon is located 63 km northwest of Ust-Kan (the district's administrative centre) by road. Vladimirovka is the nearest rural locality.
