= Urlu-Aspak =

Urlu-Aspak Урлу-Аспак
- Village
- Location within Altai Republic Location within Russia
- Coordinates: 51°41′N 86°12′E
- Country: Russia
- Region: Altai Republic
- District: Mayminsky District
- Time zone: UTC+7:00

Urlu-Aspak (Russian: Урлу-Аспак; Altay: Урлу-Аспак) is a rural locality (a selo) in Biryulinskoye Rural Settlement of Mayminsky District, the Altai Republic, Russia. The population was 427 as of 2016. There are 5 streets.

== Geography ==
Urlu-Aspak is located in the valley of the Mayma River, 49 km southeast of Mayma (the district's administrative centre) by road. Alexandrovka is the nearest rural locality.
