= Ust-Muta =

Ust-Muta Усть-Мута
- Selo
- Location within Altai Republic Location within Russia
- Coordinates: 51°13′N 84°45′E
- Country: Russia
- Region: Altai Republic
- District: Ust-Kansky District
- Time zone: UTC+7:00

Ust-Muta (Russian: Усть-Мута; Altay: Моты-Оозы, Motı-Oozı) is a rural locality (a selo) and the administrative centre of Ust-Mutainskoye Rural Settlement, Ust-Kansky District, the Altai Republic, Russia. The population was 445 as of 2016. There are 7 streets.

== Geography ==
Ust-Muta is located 42 km north of Ust-Kan (the district's administrative centre) by road. Keley is the nearest rural locality.
