= Suranash =

Suranash Суранаш
- Selo
- Location within Altai Republic Location within Russia
- Coordinates: 52°17′N 87°45′E
- Country: Russia
- Region: Altai Republic
- District: Turochaksky District
- Time zone: UTC+7:00

Suranash (Russian: Суранаш; Altay: Суранаш, Suranaş) is a rural locality (a selo) in Turochaksky District, the Altai Republic, Russia. The population was 31 as of 2016. There is 1 street.

== Geography ==
Suranash is located 103 km east of Turochak (the district's administrative centre) by road.
