= Balyktyul =

Balyktyul Балыктуюль
- Selo
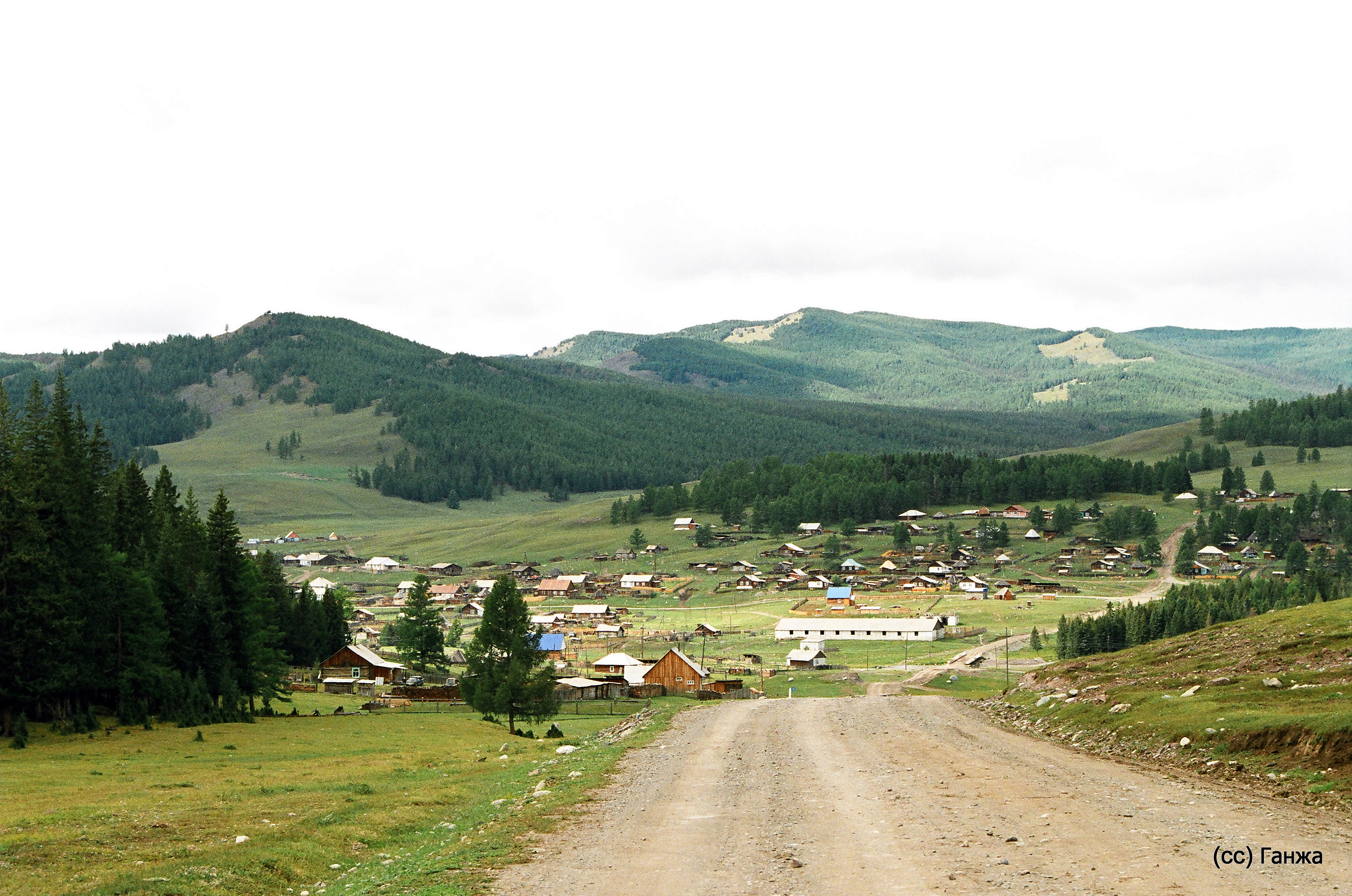

- Location within Altai Republic Location within Russia
- Coordinates: 50°45′N 88°02′E
- Country: Russia
- Region: Altai Republic
- District: Ulagansky District
- Time zone: UTC+7:00

Balyktyul (Russian: Балыктуюль; Altay: Балыкту Јул, Balıktu Ĵul) is a rural locality (a selo) and the administrative centre of Balyktyulskoye Rural Settlement of Ulagansky District, the Altai Republic, Russia. The population was 1340 as of 2016. There are 24 streets.

== Geography ==
Balyktyul is located 16 km northeast of Ulagan (the district's administrative centre) by road. Ulagan is the nearest rural locality.
