= Kurunda =

Kurunda Курунда
- Selo
- Location within Altai Republic Location within Russia
- Coordinates: 50°19′N 85°45′E
- Country: Russia
- Region: Altai Republic
- District: Ust-Koksinsky District
- Time zone: UTC+7:00

Kurunda (Russian: Курунда; Altay: Корымду, Korımdu) is a rural locality (a selo) in Ust-Koksinsky District, the Altai Republic, Russia. The population was 216 as of 2016. There are 6 streets.

== Geography ==
Kurunda is located 14 km northeast of Ust-Koksa (the district's administrative centre) by road. Kastakhta is the nearest rural locality.
