= Sakhsabay =

Sakhsabay Сахсабай
- Settlement
- Location within Altai Republic Location within Russia
- Coordinates: 50°11′N 85°30′E
- Country: Russia
- Region: Altai Republic
- District: Ust-Koksinsky District
- Time zone: UTC+7:00

Sakhsabay (Russian: Сахсабай; Altay: Саксабай, Saksabay) is a rural locality (a settlement) in Ust-Koksinsky District, the Altai Republic, Russia. The population was 17 as of 2016.

== Geography ==
Sakhsabay is located 24 km southwest of Ust-Koksa (the district's administrative centre) by road. Ognyovka is the nearest rural locality.
