= Aktel, Shebalinsky District, Altai Republic =

Aktel Актел
- Selo
- Location within Altai Republic Location within Russia
- Coordinates: 51°31′N 85°39′E
- Country: Russia
- Region: Altai Republic
- District: Shebalinsky District
- Time zone: UTC+7:00

Aktel (Russian: Актел; Altay: Ак-Jул, Ak-Ĵul) is a rural locality (a selo) and the administrative centre of Aktelskoye Rural Settlement, Shebalinsky District, the Altai Republic, Russia. The population was 344 as of 2016. There are 3 streets.

== Geography ==
Aktel is located 37 km north of Shebalino (the district's administrative centre) by road. Barlak and Kamay are the nearest rural localities.
