= Filial (rural locality) =

Filial Филиал
- Settlement
- Location within Altai Republic Location within Russia
- Coordinates: 51°50′N 86°01′E
- Country: Russia
- Region: Altai Republic
- District: Mayminsky District
- Time zone: UTC+7:00

Filial (Russian: Филиал; Altay: Филиал) is a rural locality (a settlement) in Biryulinskoye Rural Settlement of Mayminsky District, the Altai Republic, Russia. The population was 27 as of 2016.

== Geography ==
Filial is located in the valley of the Mayma River, 25 km south of Mayma (the district's administrative centre) by road. Kyzyl-Ozek and Biryulya are the nearest rural localities.
