= Zamulta =

Zamulta Замульта
- Settlement
- Location within Altai Republic Location within Russia
- Coordinates: 50°10′N 85°58′E
- Country: Russia
- Region: Altai Republic
- District: Ust-Koksinsky District
- Time zone: UTC+7:00

Zamulta (Russian: Замульта; Altay: Ары-Мыйту, Arı-Mıytu) is a rural locality (a settlement) in Ust-Koksinsky District, the Altai Republic, Russia. The population was 212 as of 2016. There are 8 streets.

== Geography ==
Zamulta is located 34 km southeast of Ust-Koksa (the district's administrative centre) by road. Multa is the nearest rural locality.
