= Ak-Koba =

Ak-Koba Ак-Коба
- Settlement
- Location within Altai Republic Location within Russia
- Coordinates: 50°09′N 86°01′E
- Country: Russia
- Region: Altai Republic
- District: Ust-Koksinsky District
- Time zone: UTC+7:00

Ak-Koba (Russian: Ак-Коба; Altay: Ак-Кобы, Ak-Kobı) is a rural locality (a settlement) in Ust-Koksinsky District, the Altai Republic, Russia. The population was 50 as of 2016. There are 5 streets.

== Geography ==
Ak-Koba is located 35 km southeast of Ust-Koksa (the district's administrative centre) by road. Zamulta is the nearest rural locality.
