= Shunarak =

Shunarak Шунарак
- Selo
- Location within Altai Republic Location within Russia
- Coordinates: 52°27′N 86°48′E
- Country: Russia
- Region: Altai Republic
- District: Turochaksky District
- Time zone: UTC+7:00

Shunarak (Russian: Шунарак; Altay: Шунарак, Şunarak) is a rural locality (a selo) in Turochaksky District, the Altai Republic, Russia. The population was 33 as of 2016. There is 1 street.

== Geography ==
Shunarak is located 41 km northwest of Turochak (the district's administrative centre) by road. Ozero-Kureyevo is the nearest rural locality.
