= Kamay, Altai Republic =

Kamay Камай
- Selo
- Location within Altai Republic Location within Russia
- Coordinates: 51°30′N 85°45′E
- Country: Russia
- Region: Altai Republic
- District: Shebalinsky District
- Time zone: UTC+7:00

Kamay (Russian: Камай; Altay: Камай) is a rural locality (a selo) in Shebalinsky District, the Altai Republic, Russia. The population was 79 as of 2016. There is 1 street.

== Geography ==
Kamay is located 45 km north of Shebalino (the district's administrative centre) by road. Aktel is the nearest rural locality.
