= Levinka =

Levinka Левинка
- Village
- Location within Altai Republic Location within Russia
- Coordinates: 51°59′N 86°25′E
- Country: Russia
- Region: Altai Republic
- District: Choysky District
- Time zone: UTC+7:00

Levinka (Russian: Левинка) is a rural locality (a selo) in Paspaulskoye Rural Settlement of Choysky District, the Altai Republic, Russia. The population was 18 as of 2016. There are 2 streets.

== Geography ==
The village is located east from Gorno-Altaysk, in the valley of the Malaya Isha River, 11 km southwest of Choya (the district's administrative centre) by road. Tunzha is the nearest rural locality.
