= Uozhan =

Uozhan Уожан
- Village
- Location within Altai Republic Location within Russia
- Coordinates: 51°19′N 86°08′E
- Country: Russia
- Region: Altai Republic
- District: Chemalsky District
- Time zone: UTC+7:00

Uozhan (Russian: Уожан; Altay: Уажан, Uajan) is a rural locality (a selo) in Chemalskoye Rural Settlement of Chemalsky District, the Altai Republic, Russia. The population was 77 as of 2016. There are 2 streets.

== Geography ==
Uozhan is located on the Chemal River, 17 km southeast of Chemal (the district's administrative centre) by road. Tolgoyek is the nearest rural locality.
