= Kumalyr =

Kumalyr Кумалыр
- Selo
- Location within Altai Republic Location within Russia
- Coordinates: 51°12′N 85°37′E
- Country: Russia
- Region: Altai Republic
- District: Shebalinsky District
- Time zone: UTC+7:00

Kumalyr (Russian: Кумалыр; Altay: Кумалыр, Kumalır) is a rural locality (a selo) in Shebalinsky District, the Altai Republic, Russia. The population was 162 as of 2016. There are 3 streets.

== Geography ==
Kumalyr is located 11 km south of Shebalino (the district's administrative centre) by road. Shebalino is the nearest rural locality.
