= Bolshoy Yaloman =

Bolshoy Yaloman Большой Яломан
- Village
- Location within Altai Republic Location within Russia
- Coordinates: 50°29′N 86°25′E
- Country: Russia
- Region: Altai Republic
- District: Ongudaysky District
- Time zone: UTC+7:00

Bolshoy Yaloman (Russian: Большой Яломан; Altay: Jаан Jаламан, Ĵaan Ĵalaman) is a rural locality (a selo) in Kupchegenskoye Rural Settlement of Ongudaysky District, the Altai Republic, Russia. The population was 232 as of 2016. There are 3 streets.

== Geography ==
Bolshoy Yaloman is Located in a mountain valley formed by the northeastern spurs of the Terektinsky Range, on the bank of the Bolshoy Yaloman River, 68 km southeast of Onguday (the district's administrative centre) by road. Maly Yaloman is the nearest rural locality.
