= Ogni, Altai Republic =

Ogni Огни
- Selo
- Location within Altai Republic Location within Russia
- Coordinates: 52°07′N 87°04′E
- Country: Russia
- Region: Altai Republic
- District: Turochaksky District
- Time zone: UTC+7:00

Ogni (Russian: Огни) is a rural locality (a selo) in Turochaksky District, the Altai Republic, Russia. The population was 17 as of 2016. There are 2 streets.

== Geography ==
Ogni is located 16 km south of Turochak (the district's administrative centre) by road. Tondoshka is the nearest rural locality.
