= Gorbunovo, Altai Republic =

Gorbunovo Горбуново
- Selo
- Location within Altai Republic Location within Russia
- Coordinates: 50°13′N 85°49′E
- Country: Russia
- Region: Altai Republic
- District: Ust-Koksinsky District
- Time zone: UTC+7:00

Gorbunovo (Russian: Горбуново; Altay: Корбо-Тал, Korbo-Tal) is a rural locality (a selo) and the administrative centre of Gorbunovskoye Rural Settlement, Ust-Koksinsky District, the Altai Republic, Russia. The population was 296 as of 2016. There are 7 streets.

== Geography ==
Gorbunovo is located 18 km southeast of Ust-Koksa (the district's administrative centre) by road. Tikhonkaya is the nearest rural locality.
