= Kayarlyk =

Kayarlyk Каярлык
- Selo
- Location within Altai Republic Location within Russia
- Coordinates: 50°40′N 85°34′E
- Country: Russia
- Region: Altai Republic
- District: Ongudaysky District
- Time zone: UTC+7:00

Kayarlyk (Russian: Каярлык; Altay: Кайырлык, Kayırlık) is a rural locality (a selo) in Ongudaysky District, the Altai Republic, Russia. The population was 195 as of 2016. There are 5 streets.

== Geography ==
Kayarlyk is located km 63 west of Onguday (the district's administrative centre) by road. Yelo is the nearest rural locality.
