= Akbom =

Akbom Акбом
- Selo
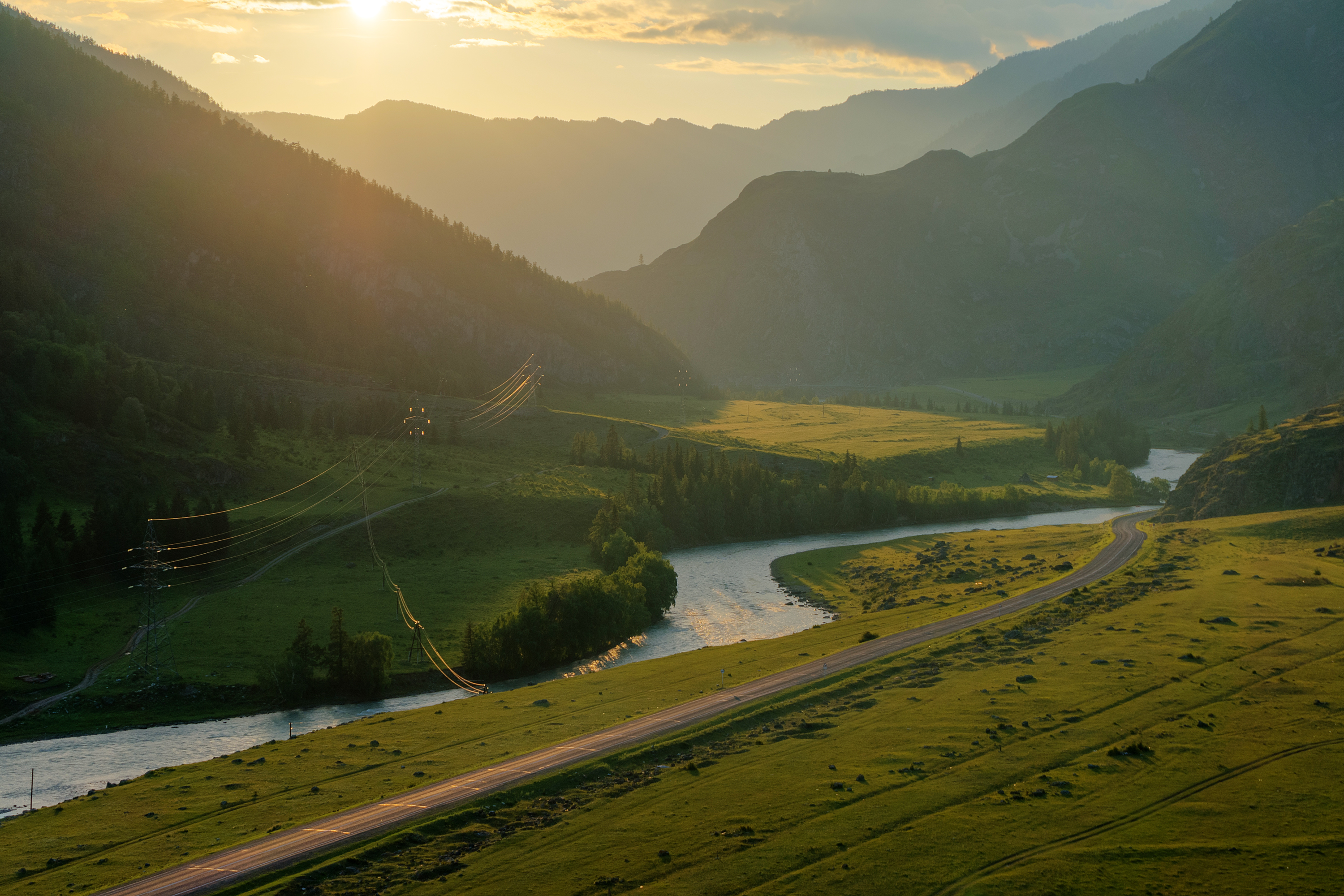
- Chuya river near Akbom

- Location within Altai Republic Location within Russia
- Coordinates: 50°21′N 87°02′E
- Country: Russia
- Region: Altai Republic
- District: Ongudaysky District
- Time zone: UTC+7:00

Akbom (Russian: Акбом; Altai: Ак-Боом, Ak-Boom) is a rural locality (a selo) in Ongudaysky District, the Altai Republic, Russia. The population was 19 as of 2016. There is 1 street.

== Geography ==
Akbom is located 106 km southeast of Onguday (the district's administrative centre) by road. Iodro is the nearest rural locality.
