= Oro, Altai Republic =

Oro Оро
- Selo
- Location within Altai Republic Location within Russia
- Coordinates: 50°54′N 85°00′E
- Country: Russia
- Region: Altai Republic
- District: Ust-Kansky District
- Time zone: UTC+7:00

Oro (Russian: Оро; Altay: Оро) is a rural locality (a selo) in Ust-Kansky District, the Altai Republic, Russia. The population was 212 as of 2016. There are 3 streets.

== Geography ==
Oro is located 21 km east of Ust-Kan (the district's administrative centre) by road. Yabogan is the nearest rural locality.
