= Kokbesh =

Kokbesh Кокбеш
- Selo
- Location within Altai Republic Location within Russia
- Coordinates: 51°11′N 87°45′E
- Country: Russia
- Region: Altai Republic
- District: Ulagansky District
- Time zone: UTC+7:00

Kokbesh (Russian: Кокбеш; Altay: Кӧк-Паш, Kök-Paş) is a rural locality (a selo) in Ulagansky District, the Altai Republic, Russia. The population was 33 as of 2016. There is 1 street.

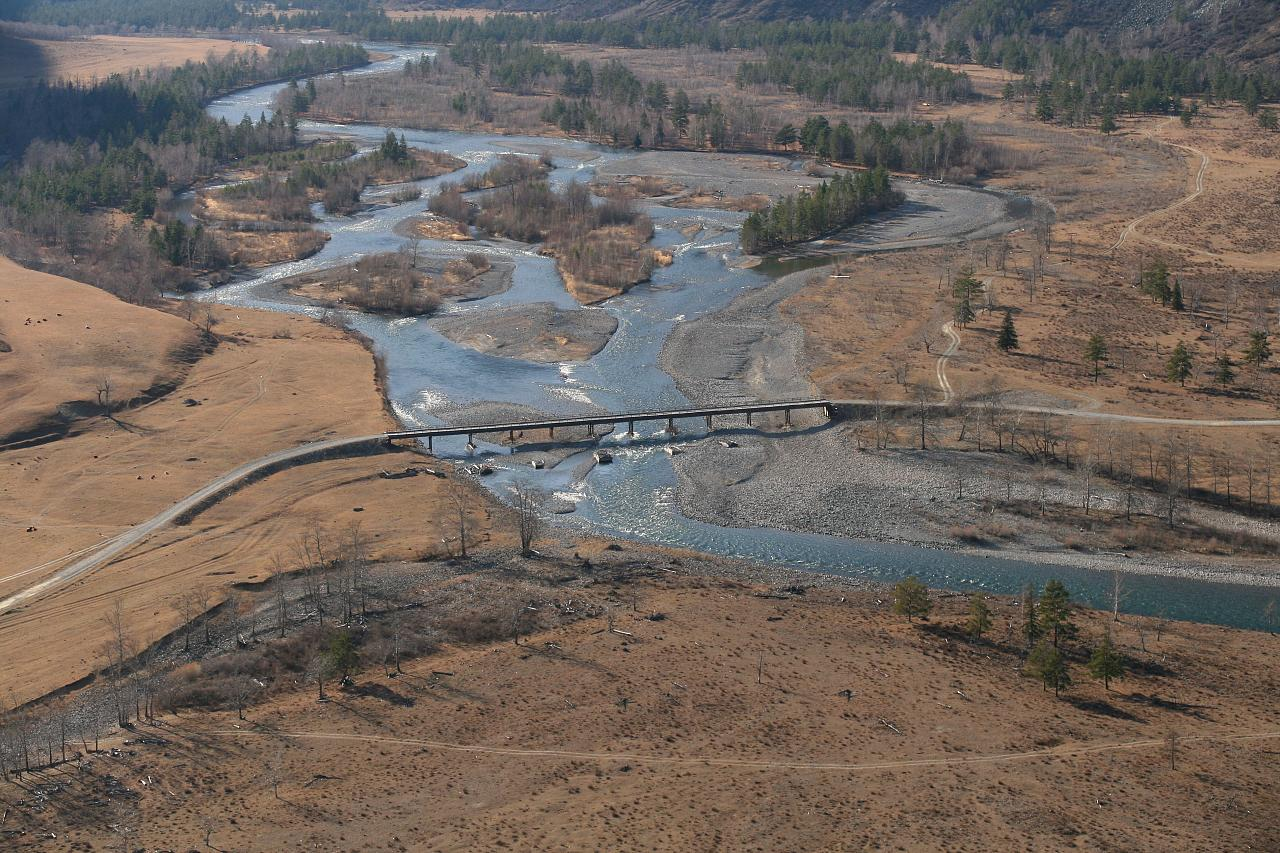
The bridge at Kokbesh
