= Daybovo =

Daybovo Дайбово
- Selo
- Location within Altai Republic Location within Russia
- Coordinates: 52°22′N 86°54′E
- Country: Russia
- Region: Altai Republic
- District: Turochaksky District
- Time zone: UTC+7:00

Daybovo (Russian: Дайбово; Altay: Дайбово) is a rural locality (a selo) in Turochaksky District, the Altai Republic, Russia. The population was 1 as of 2016. There is 1 street.

== Geography ==
Daybovo is located 25 km northwest of Turochak (the district's administrative centre) by road. Udalovka is the nearest rural locality.
