= Mukhor-Cherga =

Mukhor-Cherga Мухор-Черга
- Selo
- Location within Altai Republic Location within Russia
- Coordinates: 51°24′N 85°20′E
- Country: Russia
- Region: Altai Republic
- District: Shebalinsky District
- Time zone: UTC+7:00

Mukhor-Cherga (Russian: Мухор-Черга; Altay: Мукур-Чаргы, Mukur-Çargı) is a rural locality (a selo) in Shebalinsky District, the Altai Republic, Russia. The population was 127 as of 2016. There are 3 streets.

== Geography ==
Mukhor-Cherga is located 65 km northwest of Shebalino (the district's administrative centre) by road. Uluscherga is the nearest rural locality.
