= Barkhatovo =

Barkhatovo Бархатово
- Selo
- Location within Altai Republic Location within Russia
- Coordinates: 50°55′N 85°49′E
- Country: Russia
- Region: Altai Republic
- District: Ongudaysky District
- Time zone: UTC+7:00

Barkhatovo (Russian: Бархатово) is a rural locality (a selo) in Ongudaysky District, the Altai Republic, Russia. The population was 9 as of 2016.

== Geography ==
Barkhatovo is located 34 km northwest of Onguday (the district's administrative centre) by road. Neftebaza and Tuyekta are the nearest rural localities.
