= Souzar =

Souzar Соузар
- Selo
- Location within Altai Republic Location within Russia
- Coordinates: 50°26′N 84°51′E
- Country: Russia
- Region: Altai Republic
- District: Ust-Koksinsky District
- Time zone: UTC+7:00

Souzar (Russian: Соузар; Altay: Суузар, Suuzar) is a rural locality (a selo) in Ust-Koksinsky District, the Altai Republic, Russia. The population was 25 as of 2016. There is the only one street.

== Geography ==
Souzar is located 71 km northwest of Ust-Koksa (the district's administrative centre) by road. Talda is the nearest rural locality.
