= Kara Koby =

Kara Koby Кара Кобы
- Selo
- Location within Altai Republic Location within Russia
- Coordinates: 50°48′N 85°34′E
- Country: Russia
- Region: Altai Republic
- District: Ongudaysky District
- Time zone: UTC+7:00

Kara Koby (Russian: Кара Кобы; Altay: Кор-Кобы, Kor-Kobı) is a rural locality (a selo) in Ongudaysky District, the Altai Republic, Russia. The population was 244 as of 2016. There are 5 streets.

== Geography ==
Kara Koby is located 46 km west of Onguday (the district's administrative centre) by road. Yelo and Tenga are the nearest rural localities.
