= Bashtala =

Bashtala Баштала
- Selo
- Location within Altai Republic Location within Russia
- Coordinates: 50°17′N 85°39′E
- Country: Russia
- Region: Altai Republic
- District: Ust-Koksinsky District
- Time zone: UTC+7:00

Bashtala (Russian: Баштала; Altay: Баштаҥул, Baştañul) is a rural locality (a village) in Ust-Koksinsky District, the Altai Republic, Russia. The population was 454 as of 2016. There are 15 streets.

== Geography ==
Bashtala is located 4 km northeast of Ust-Koksa (the district's administrative centre) by road. Ust-Koksa is the nearest rural locality.
