= Mariinsk, Altai Republic =

Mariinsk Мариинск
- Selo
- Location within Altai Republic Location within Russia
- Coordinates: 51°24′N 84°57′E
- Country: Russia
- Region: Altai Republic
- District: Shebalinsky District
- Time zone: UTC+7:00

Mariinsk (Russian: Мариинск; Altay: Отогол, Otogol) is a rural locality (a selo) in Shebalinsky District, the Altai Republic, Russia. The population was 182 as of 2016. There are 2 streets.

== Geography ==
Mariinsk is located 107 km west of Shebalino (the district's administrative centre) by road. Ilyinka is the nearest rural locality.
