= Gusevka, Altai Republic =

Gusevka Гусевка
- Selo
- Location within Altai Republic Location within Russia
- Coordinates: 52°01′N 86°32′E
- Country: Russia
- Region: Altai Republic
- District: Choysky District
- Time zone: UTC+7:00

Gusevka (Russian: Гусевка) is a rural locality (a selo) in Choysky District, the Altai Republic, Russia. The population was 363 as of 2016. There are 3 streets.

== Geography ==
Gusevka is located 4 km north of Choya (the district's administrative centre) by road. Choya is the nearest rural locality.
