= Ozyornoye, Ust-Kansky District, Altai Republic =

Ozyornoye Озёрное
- Selo
- Location within Altai Republic Location within Russia
- Coordinates: 50°59′N 84°45′E
- Country: Russia
- Region: Altai Republic
- District: Ust-Kansky District
- Time zone: UTC+7:00

Ozyornoye (Russian: Озёрное; Altay: Кара-Суу, Kara-Suu) is a rural locality (a selo) in Ust-Kansky District, the Altai Republic, Russia. The population was 172 as of 2016. There are 3 streets.

== Geography ==
Ozyornoye is located 9 km north of Ust-Kan (the district's administrative centre) by road. Ust-Kan and Kozul are the nearest rural localities.
