= Yustik =

Yustik Юстик
- Village
- Location within Altai Republic Location within Russia
- Coordinates: 50°21′N 85°14′E
- Country: Russia
- Region: Altai Republic
- District: Ust-Koksinsky District
- Time zone: UTC+7:00

Yustik (Russian: Юстик; Altay: Јӱс Тыт, Ĵüs Tıt) is a rural locality (a selo) in Ust-Koksinsky District, the Altai Republic, Russia. The population was 300 as of 2016. There are 4 streets.

== Geography ==
Yustik is located near the Koksa River, 37 km northwest of Ust-Koksa (the district's administrative centre) by road. Krasnoyarka is the nearest rural locality.
