= Tubalars =

Tubalar
Regions with significant populations
- Russia: Altai Republic: 1,965

Languages
- Northern Altai (Tubalar)

Religion
- Orthodox Christianity, Shamanism

Related ethnic groups
- Altaians, Kumandins, Teleuts, Siberian Tatars

The Tubalars are an ethnic subgroup of the Altaians native to the Altai Republic in Russia.

According to the 2010 census, there were 1,965 Tubalars in Russia. In 2002 they were listed by the authorities within the Indigenous small-numbered peoples of the North, Siberia and the Far East.

The villages with the highest population of Tubalars are Artybash, Iogach, Novotroitsk, Tuloi, Tondoshka, Kebezen, Ust-Pyzha, Biyka, Yailu, Chuyka, Torochak, Paspaul, Salganda, Karakoksha, Tunzha, Krasnoselskoye, Uskuch, Uimen, and Karasuk.

== History ==
The Tubalars emerged from the merging of Turkic tribes with Ket, Samoyedic, and other native Siberian groups. This was a process that began as early as the period when the Yenisei Kyrgyz dominated the region. The Mongols then ruled over the region and its people from the 13th to 18th centuries. The Dzungars then briefly controlled the area until the Tubalars (along with other Altaians) submitted to the Russians.

Due to socio-economic changes taking place in the area during the middle to late 20th century, traditional Tubalar culture witnessed a decline. Many Tubalars migrated to cities for work and the merging of small, "unpromising" villages into larger ones resulted in many historically Tuba villages being left abandoned or non-existent. There has been a recent push by the Tubalars to conserve their culture and language. The Tubalars consider themselves to be distinct from the other Turkic peoples in the Altai region.

== Culture ==
The Tubalars were originally hunters and animals living in the taiga were vital to the local subsistence economy. Around the 19th century, Tubalars took up picking cedar nuts as an additional economic activity.

The traditional dwellings of the Tubalars included polygonal yurts made out of bark or log and topped with a conic bark roof. Other types of dwellings also included conic yurts made out of bark or perches.

Traditional Tubalar dress included short breeches, linen shirts, and single-breasted robes. A clan structure is still strongly prevalent among the modern Tubalars.

The sacred tree of Tubalars is the cedar, a symbol of the power, beauty and courage of taiga. The Holiday of Cedar is a celebration of this tree.

== Religion ==
Most Tubalars are Orthodox Christian but there is a significant minority that still practice shamanism.
