= Ust-Lebed =

Ust-Lebed Усть-Лебедь
- Village
- Location within Altai Republic Location within Russia
- Coordinates: 52°17′N 87°01′E
- Country: Russia
- Region: Altai Republic
- District: Turochaksky District
- Time zone: UTC+7:00

Ust-Lebed (Russian: Усть-Лебедь; Altay: Куу-Оозы, Kuu-Oozı) is a rural locality (a selo) in Turochakskoye Rural Settlement of Turochaksky District, the Altai Republic, Russia. The population was 2 as of 2016. There is 1 street.

== Geography ==
Ust-Lebed is located at the confluence of the Lebed and Biya Rivers, 11 km northwest of Turochak (the district's administrative centre) by road. Lebedskoye is the nearest rural locality.
