= Bashkaus =

River in Siberia, Russia

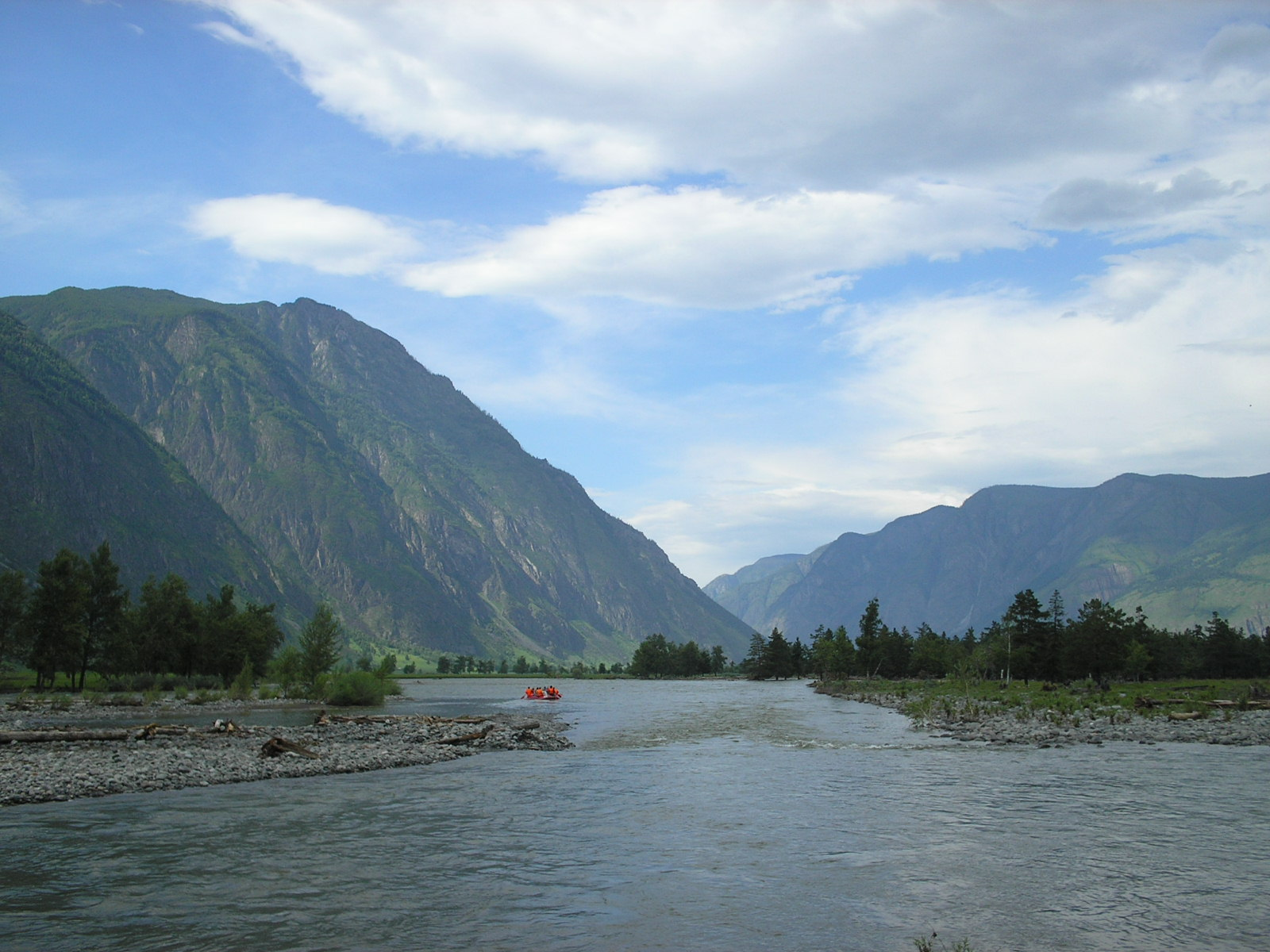
- The Bashkaus in the Ulagansky District

Location
- Country: Russia

Physical characteristics
- Mouth: Chulyshman
  - coordinates: 51.1951°N 87.7661°E
- Length: 219 km (136 mi)
- Basin size: 7,770 km^{2} (3,000 sq mi)

Basin features
- Progression: Chulyshman→ Lake Teletskoye→ Biya→ Ob→ Kara Sea
- Tributaries
  - left: Chebdar

The Bashkaus (Russian: Башкаус) is a river in the Altai Republic in Siberia, Russia. It is a left tributary of the Chulyshman, which flows into Lake Teletskoye (Ob basin). The Bashkaus is 219 kilometres (136 mi) long, and its drainage basin covers 7,770 square kilometres (3,000 mi^{2}). It rises from a cirque lake in the eastern part of the Kuraiskii Mountain Range. In its lower reaches, it flows in a narrow valley, which often turns into a rocky canyon. The mean annual flow rate near the village of Ust’-Ulagan measures about 30 cubic metres per second (1,100 cu ft/s).

It is widely considered one of the most challenging rivers for white-water rafting in the former USSR. In Russia, it is known as a Class 5 river meaning that its technical difficulty, i.e. the difficulty in navigating it in a raft or canoe, is high while its remoteness or distance from assistance in the event of things going wrong is Class 6 (on the Russian scale of one to six.) Hence, the Bashkaus is anecdotally ranked as the second most difficult river in the former USSR to raft or canoe, behind the nearby Chulyshman River. The Bashkaus was first recorded as fully kayaked in 1992, by a group from Ireland.
