= Maysk =

Maysk Майск
- Village
- Location within Altai Republic Location within Russia
- Coordinates: 52°19′N 88°08′E
- Country: Russia
- Region: Altai Republic
- District: Turochaksky District
- Time zone: UTC+7:00

Maysk (Russian: Майск; Altay: Шоорно, Şoorno) is a rural locality (a selo) in Mayskoye Rural Settlement of Turochaksky District, the Altai Republic, Russia. The population was 118 as of 2016. There are 3 streets.

== Geography ==
Maysk is located at the confluence of the Kaurchak and Lebed Rivers, 159 km east of Turochak (the district's administrative centre) by road. Kirpichny is the nearest rural locality.
