= Koo (rural locality) =

Koo Коо
- Village
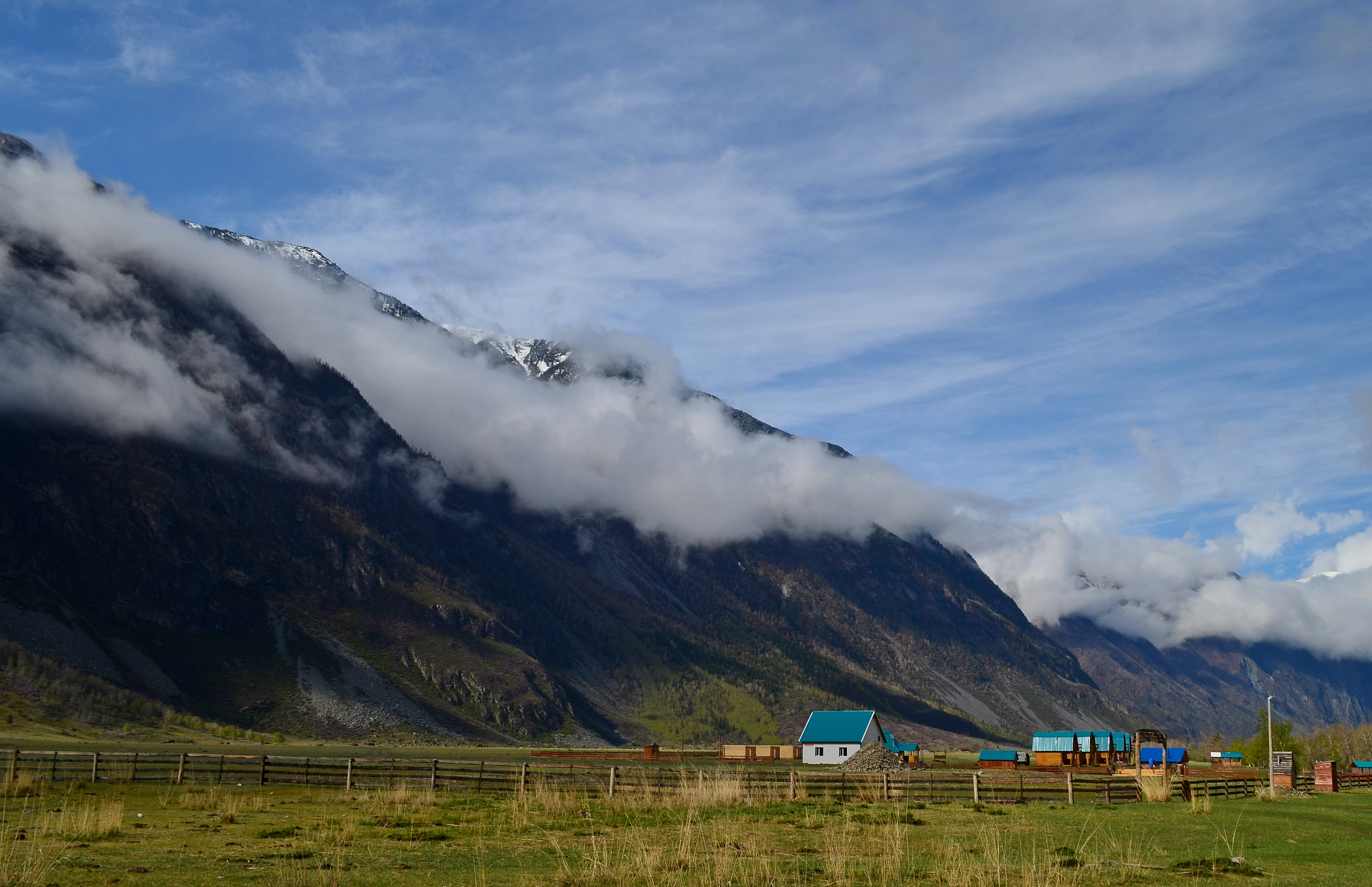

- Location within Altai Republic Location within Russia
- Coordinates: 51°05′N 87°53′E
- Country: Russia
- Region: Altai Republic
- District: Ulagansky District
- Time zone: UTC+7:00

Koo (Russian: Коо; Altay: Кӧӧ, Köö) is a rural locality (a selo) in Chelushmanskoye Rural Settlement of Ulagansky District, the Altai Republic, Russia. The population was 236 as of 2016. There are 5 streets.

== Geography ==
Koo is located on the left bank of the Chulyshman River, 84 km north of Ulagan (the district's administrative centre) by road.

== Ethnicity ==
The village is inhabited by Altai people-Telengits and others.
