= Ozero-Kureyevo =

Ozero-Kureyevo Озеро-Куреево
- Village
- Location within Altai Republic Location within Russia
- Coordinates: 52°27′N 86°45′E
- Country: Russia
- Region: Altai Republic
- District: Turochaksky District
- Time zone: UTC+7:00

Ozero-Kureyevo (Russian: Озеро-Куреево; Altay: Кӱрей кӧл, Kürey köl) is a rural locality (a selo) in Ozero-Kureyevskoye Rural Settlement of Turochaksky District, the Altai Republic, Russia. The population was 384 as of 2016. There are 8 streets.

== Geography ==
Ozero-Kureyevo is located on the right bank of the Biya River, 46 km northwest of Turochak (the district's administrative centre) by road. Turbaza Kureyevskaya is the nearest rural locality.
