= Chebdar =

River in Russia

Location
- Country: Russia

Physical characteristics
- Mouth: Bashkaus
  - coordinates: 51.1316°N 87.7121°E
- Length: 50 km (31 mi)
- Basin size: 902 km^{2} (348 sq mi)

Basin features
- Progression: Bashkaus→ Chulyshman→ Lake Teletskoye→ Biya→ Ob→ Kara Sea

The Chebdar is a river in Altai Republic in Russia. It is 50 kilometres (31 mi) long, and its drainage basin covers 902 square kilometres (348 mi^{2}).

The Chebdar is the only significant and paddleable tributary of the Bashkaus, coming in from the left where the Lower Gorge of the Bashkaus ends, not far from Chulyshman confluence.

The river starts on the plateau west to the lower Bashkaus valley and for the first 25 to 30 kilometres (16 to 19 mi) it is a small stream flowing north. At the point where Chebdar valley swings east (towards Bashkaus), three large tributaries, each nearly the size of the main river, come in and make it paddleable. The last of these, Synyrlu, has a trail along coming down to the confluence and this was reported as the optimal put-in.

After the Synyrlu confluence, the Chebdar flows in a narrow 25-kilometre (16 mi) long gorge that cuts through all the way to Bashkaus. This section was reported as quite similar to the Lower Gorge of the Bashkaus, but narrower, tougher, steeper and with less water. Both banks are generally not passable, and there is significant rock fall danger especially during rainy weather.
