= Sankin Ail =

Sankin Ail Санькин Аил
- Village
- Location within Altai Republic Location within Russia
- Coordinates: 52°11′N 87°06′E
- Country: Russia
- Region: Altai Republic
- District: Turochaksky District
- Time zone: UTC+7:00

Sankin Ail (Russian: Санькин Аил; Altay: Тагда-Айыл, Tagda-Ayıl) is a rural locality (a selo) in Tondoshskoye Rural Settlement of Turochaksky District, the Altai Republic, Russia. The population was 115 as of 2016. There are 6 streets.

== Geography ==
Sankin Ail is located near the Biya River, 9 km south of Turochak (the district's administrative centre) by road. Turochak is the nearest rural locality.
