= Syurya =

Syurya Сюря
- Selo
- Location within Altai Republic Location within Russia
- Coordinates: 51°54′N 87°03′E
- Country: Russia
- Region: Altai Republic
- District: Turochaksky District
- Time zone: UTC+7:00

Syurya (Russian: Сюря; Altay: Сӱрӱ, Sürü) is a rural locality (a selo) in Turochaksky District, the Altai Republic, Russia. The population was 5 as of 2016. There are 3 streets.

== Geography ==
Syurya is located 53 km south of Turochak (the district's administrative centre) by road. Kebezen is the nearest rural locality.
