= Bele (rural locality) =

Bele Беле
- Village
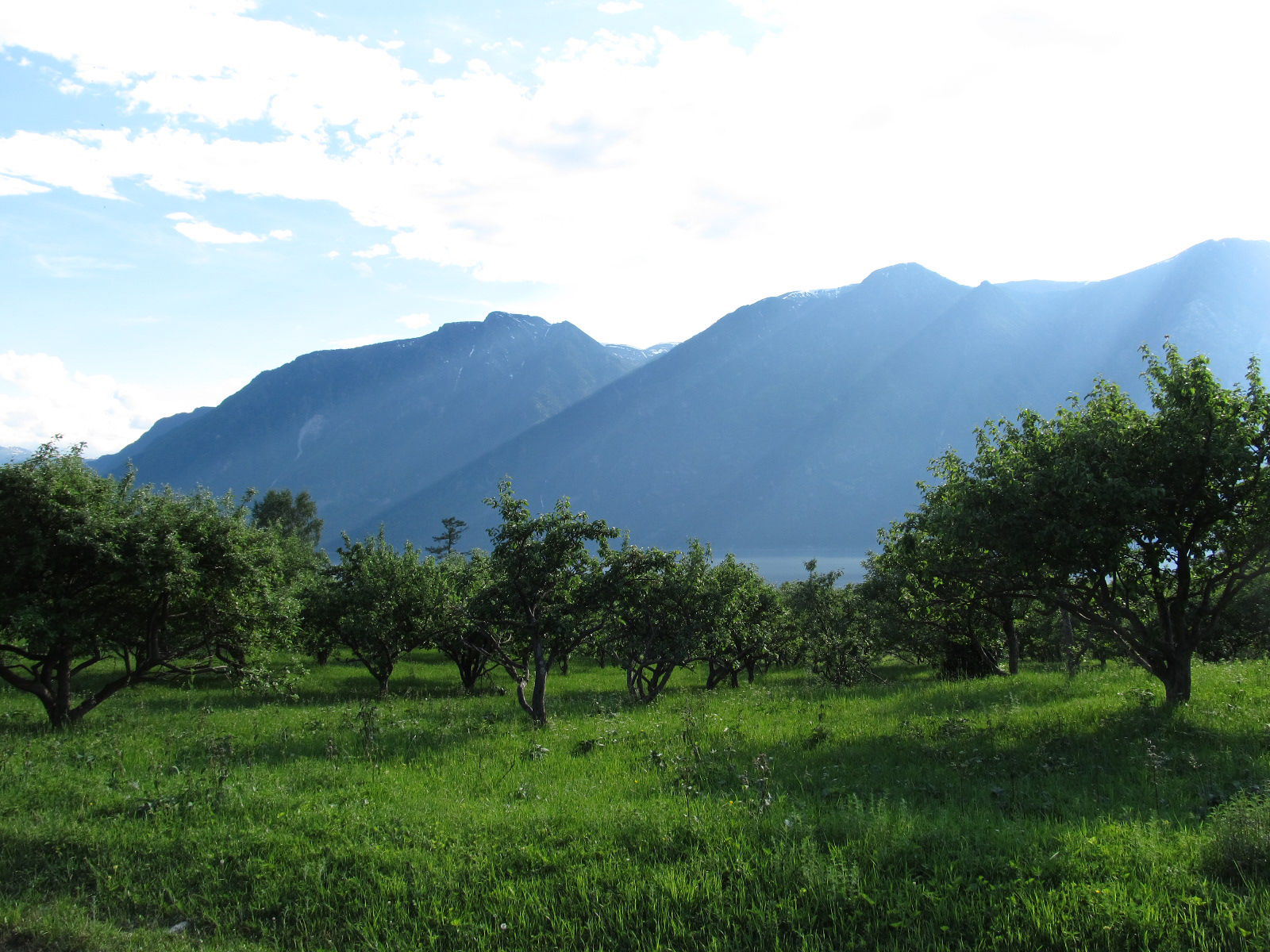

- Location within Altai Republic Location within Russia
- Coordinates: 51°25′N 87°47′E
- Country: Russia
- Region: Altai Republic
- District: Ulagansky District
- Time zone: UTC+7:00

Bele (Russian: Беле; Altay: Беле) is a rural locality (a selo) in Chelushmanskoye Rural Settlement of Ulagansky District, the Altai Republic, Russia. The population was 30 as of 2016. There is 1 street.

== Geography ==
Bele is located on the right bank of the Lake Teletskoye in the valley of the Barchik creek, 125 km north of Ulagan (the district's administrative centre) by road. Kordon Atyshtu is the nearest rural locality.

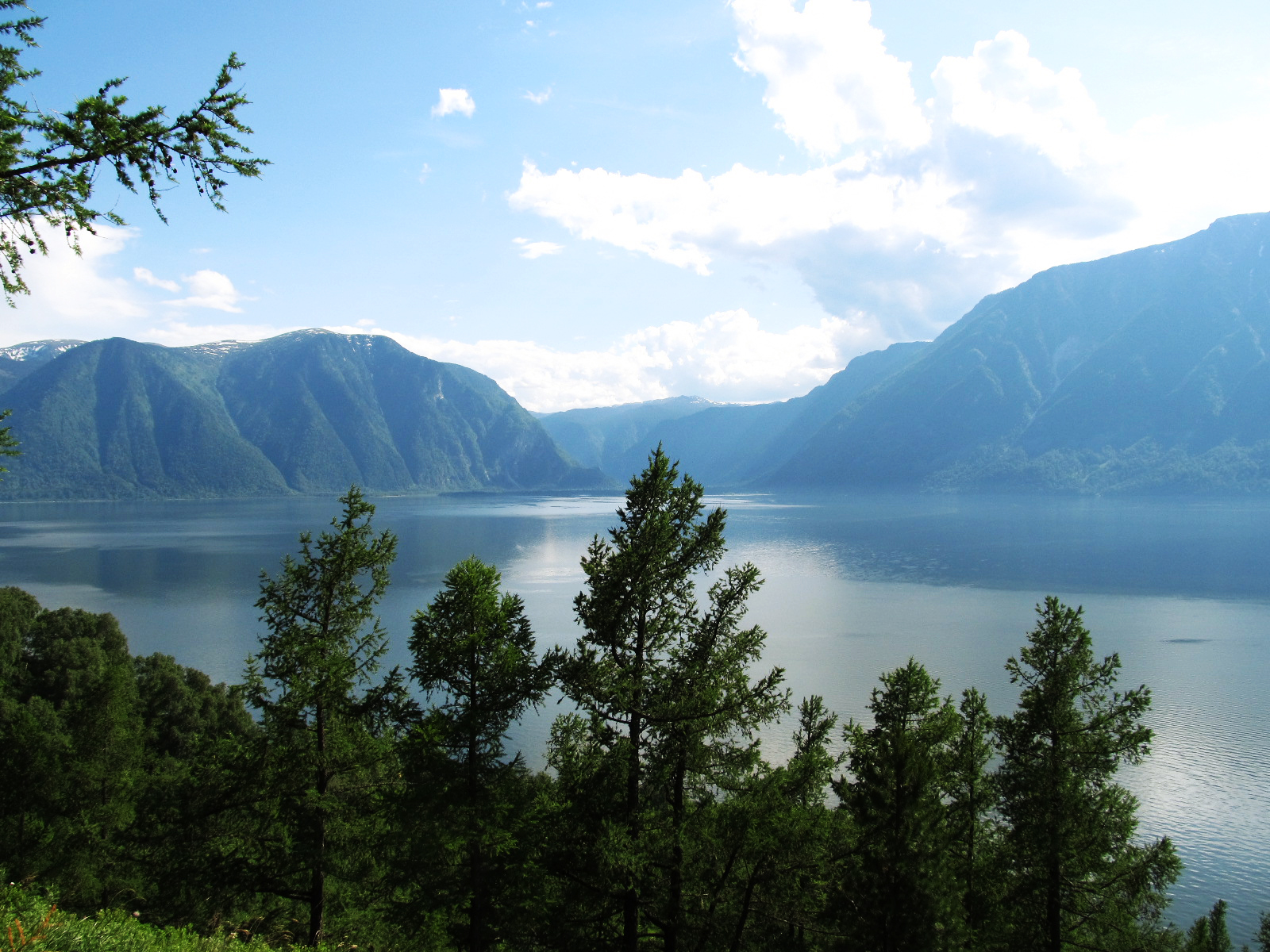
Teletskoye lake from the village

== Ethnicity ==
The village is inhabited by Russians, Altai people and others.
