= Balykcha =

Balykcha Балыкча
- Village
- Location within Altai Republic Location within Russia
- Coordinates: 51°17′N 87°43′E
- Country: Russia
- Region: Altai Republic
- District: Ulagansky District
- Time zone: UTC+7:00

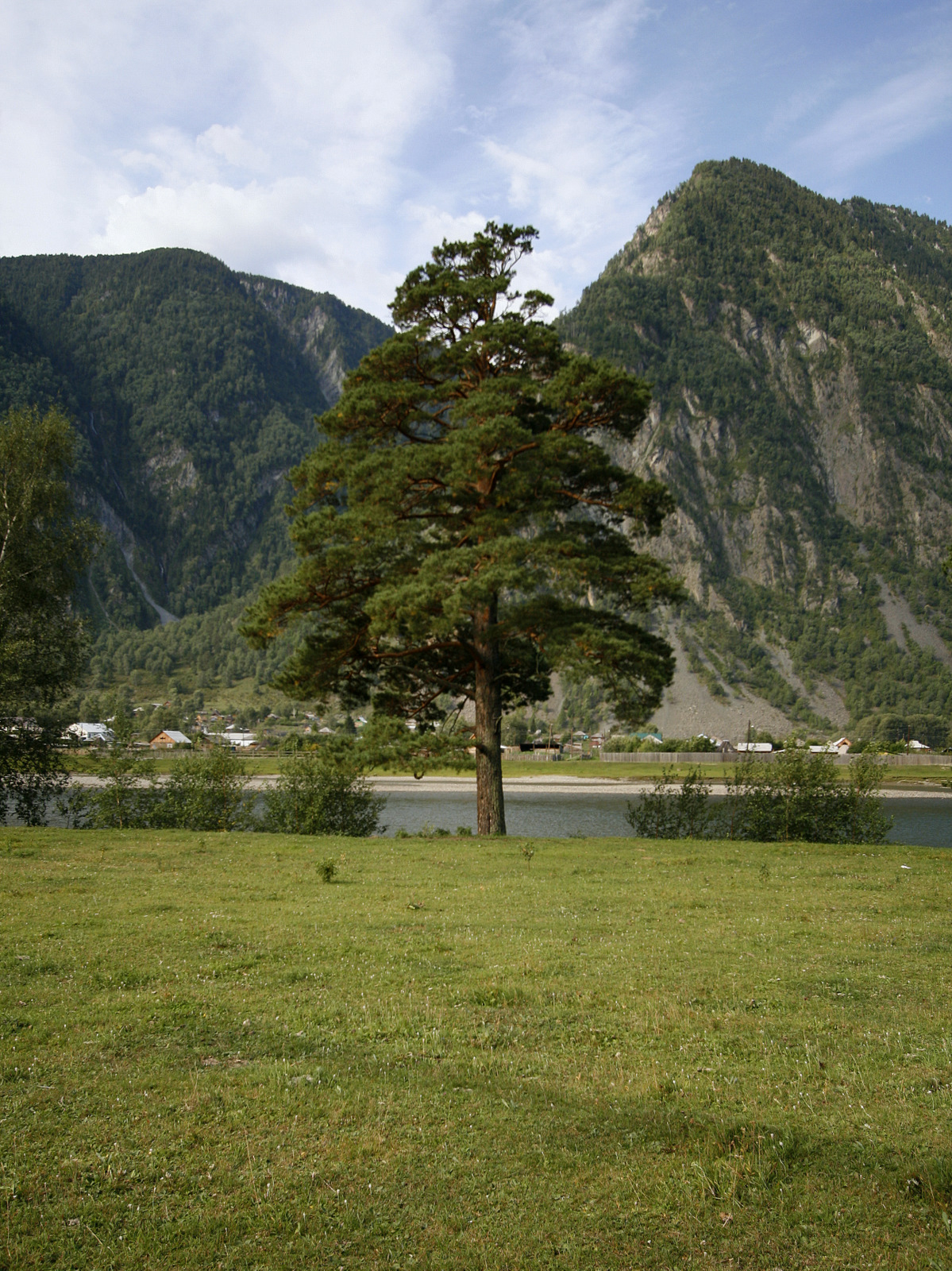
The Altai Mountains, with the village of Balykcha in the background.

Balykcha (Russian: Балыкча; Altay: Балыкчы, Balıkçı) is a rural locality (a selo) and the administrative centre of Chelushmanskoye Rural Settlement of Ulagansky District, the Altai Republic, Russia. The population was 863 as of 2016. There are 9 streets.

== Geography ==
Balykcha is located on the Chulyshman River, 115 km north of Ulagan (the district's administrative centre) by road. Kordon Atyshtu is the nearest rural locality.
