= Altai Nature Reserve =

Nature reserve in the Altai Republic, Russia

- Russian: Алтайский заповедник Altayskiy Zapovednik
- IUCN category Ia (strict nature reserve)
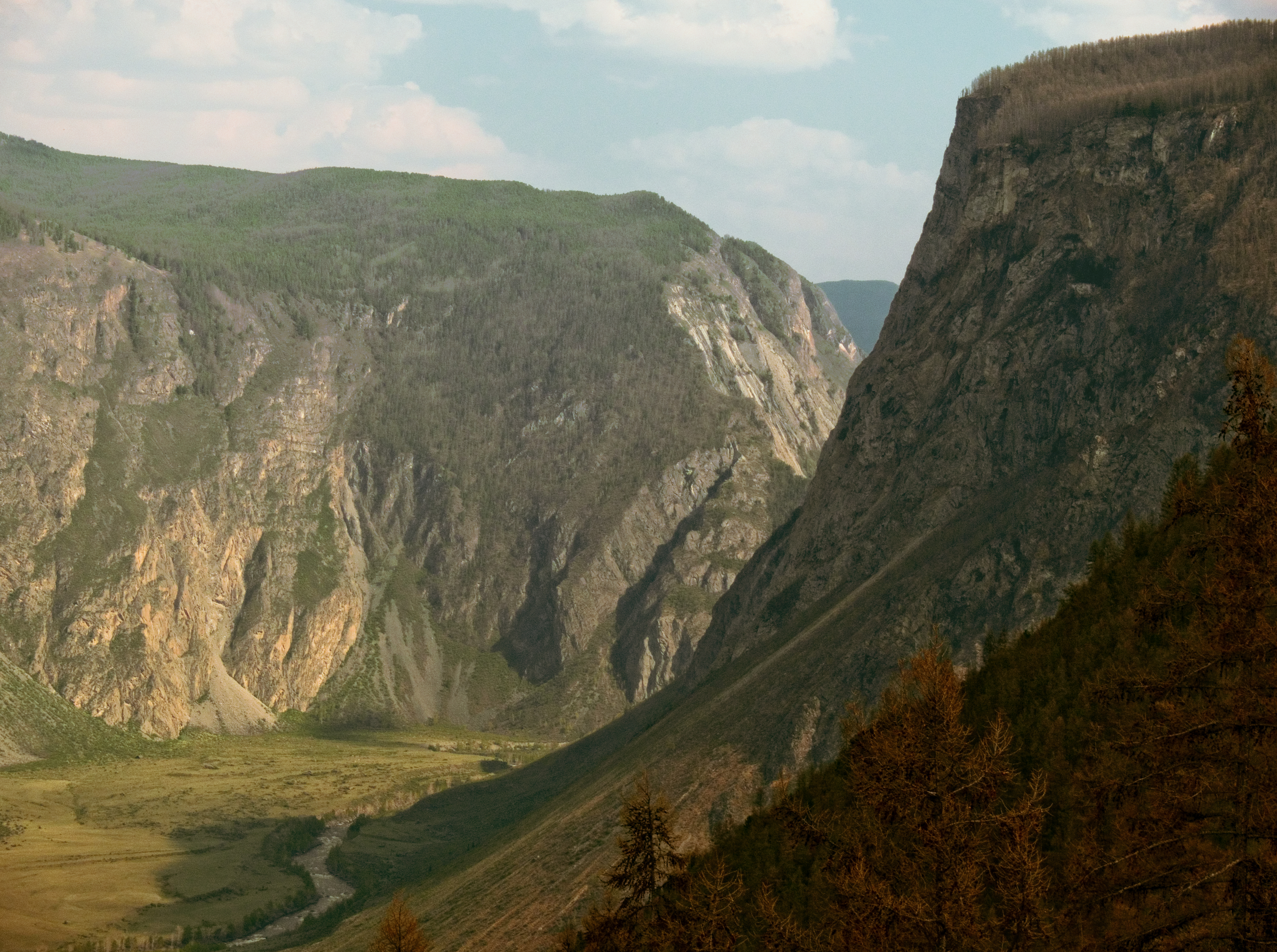
- Katu-Yaryk pass, Altai Zapovednik

- Location within Russia
- Location: Altai Republic
- Nearest city: Gorno-Altaysk
- Coordinates: 51°34′0″N 87°45′0″E
- Area: 8,712 square kilometres (3,364 mi^{2})
- Established: 1932
- Governing body: Ministry of Natural Resources and Environment (Russia)
- Website: http://www.altzapovednik.ru/

Altai Nature Reserve (Russian: Алтайский заповедник, also called Altayskiy Zapovednik) is a Russian zapovednik ('sanctuary, strict nature reserve') in the Altai Mountains of south Siberia, Russia. It is part of the UNESCO World Heritage Site "Golden Mountains of Altai", recognized as an area of high biodiversity and isolation from human intrusion. It is also included in the UNESCO World Network of Biosphere Reserves. The Altai Reserve includes the 30 km (19-mile) east bank of Lake Teletskoye and stretches 230 km (140 miles) into the high mountains to the southeast of the lake. It is situated in Ulagansky District and Turochaksky District in the north and east of the Altai Republic.

== Topography ==
The reserve has an elongated shape running from the northeast to southwest along the Teletskoye basin and into the high interior. Elevations rise to 3,500 metres (11,500 ft). This territory averages 35 km (22 miles) wide through its 230 km (140-mile) length. Lake Teletskoye is in the upper northwest end. The Chulyshman River runs into the lake, with the Chulyshman valley forming part of the western border of the Altia Reserve. Most of the reserve is the plains and alpine ridges of the Chulyshman Highlands. Over 20% of the territory is rock, scree and gravel. On the high plateaus there are over 1,000 alpine lakes greater than 1 hectare (2.5 acres) in size.

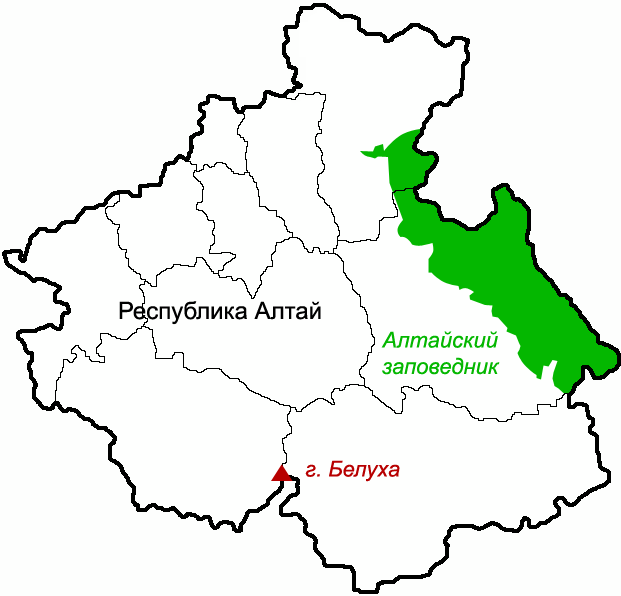
Location of Altai Zapovednik (in green) in the northeast of the Altai Republic

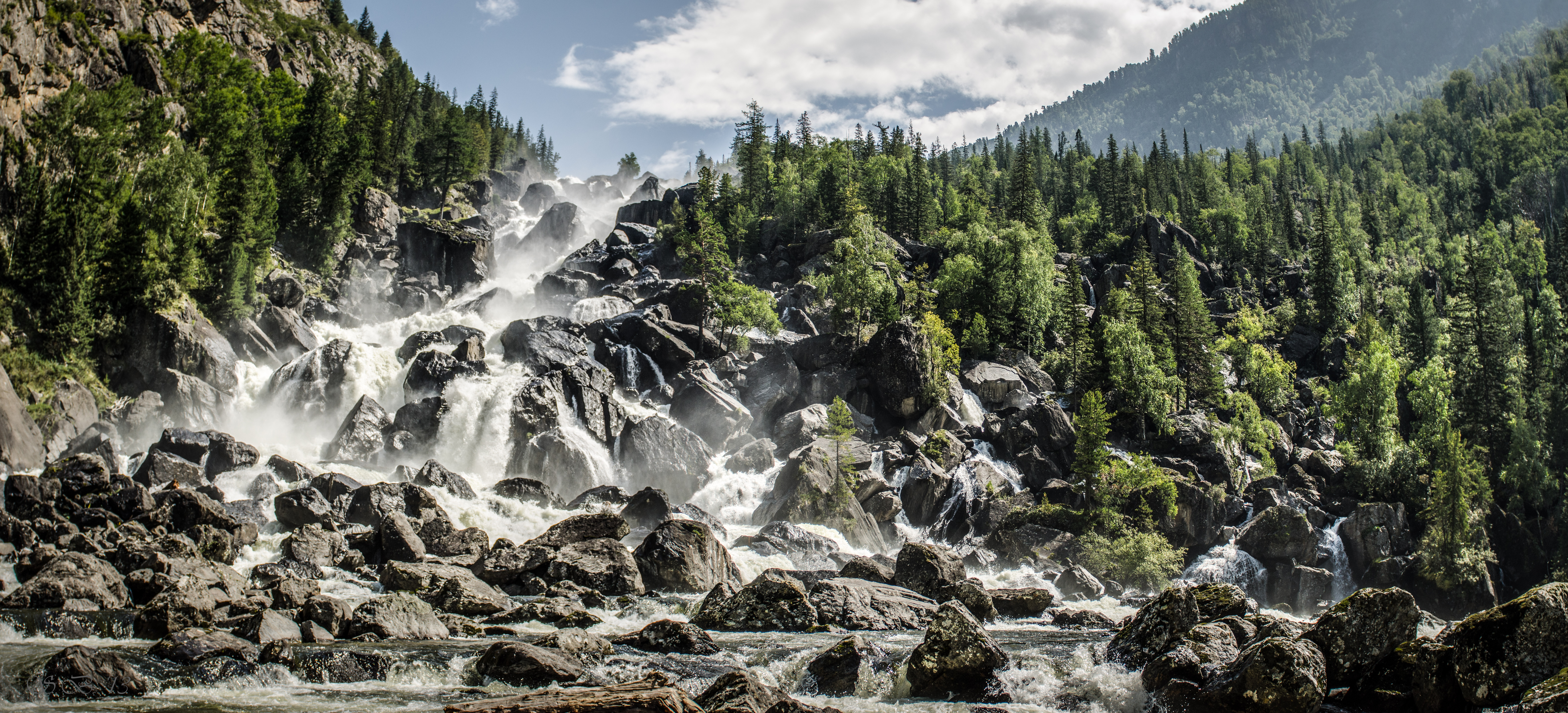
Great Falls of the Chuchinsky River, one of the six areas of the Altai Reserve open to tourists

== Climate and ecoregion ==
Altai is located in the Sayan montane conifer forests ecoregion. This ecoregion is characterized by mountains dissected by river valleys, high levels of precipitation, and high biodiversity. Flora is generally dependent on the elevation and terrain, with forest having three main subzones based on altitude: light needle-leaf sparse taiga, dark needle-leaf taiga, and dark taiga. The Altai reserve has been for the most part undisturbed by human activity, and is one of the few remaining pristine areas of this ecoregion. It covers 9.4% of the entire Republic of Altai, and there are no roads in the reserve.

The climate of Altai is a Humid continental climate, with a cool summer (Köppen climate classification Subarctic climate, Dfc). This climate is characterized by mild summers (only 1–3 months above 10 °C; 50 °F) and cold, snowy winters (coldest month below −3 °C; 26.6 °F). Over the past 50 years in the Altai reserve, the warmest month has been July (16.8 °C; 62.2 °F), the coldest month January (−8.3 °C; 17.1 °F), and the average rainfall has been 865 millimetres (34.1 in).

== Flora and fauna ==
The most common trees in the Altai Reserve coniferous species: Siberian larch, Siberian cedar and Siberian fir. On the slopes near Lake Teletskoye there are some secondary forests of birch and alder, but most of the reserve to the south is untouched — cedars on the site have been measured up to 1.8 metres (5 ft 11 in) in diameter and 400–450 years in age. Scientists at the reserves have recorded over 1,500 species of vascular plants, including 22 species listed as "vulnerable" in the Red Book of the Russian Federation. There are over 70 species of mammals in the reserve, including two endangered species, the Snow Leopard and the Altai argali. There are 19 species of fish, mostly in Lake Teletskoye, including pike, perch, and whitefish. In the streams the most common fish is the grayling. Of the 331 species of birds found in the reserve, most (48%) are passerine (159 species), waders (48 species), Falconiformes (30 species), and geese (29 species). The remaining 66 species account for only 20%.

== Ecotourism ==
As a strict nature reserve, the Altai Reserve is mostly closed to the general public, although scientists and those with "environmental education" purposes can make arrangements with park management for visits. There are six "ecotourist" routes in the reserve, however, that are open to the public, but require permits to be obtained in advance. Park management recommends allowing 2–3 months in advance for obtaining permits. The main office is in the city of Gorno-Altaysk.

The six ecotourist routes open to the public (permits required) are:

1. Chichelgansky Zigzag. Overlook of Lake Teletskoye, ethno-cultural visitor center, Yaylyu waterway hike. (website (in Russian)
2. Belinskaya Terrace. Ancient monuments of the Turkic period - "Kaeser-Tash" (stone warrior), "IT-Bash" (stone-dog). (website (in Russian))
3. Corbou Waterfall. 25 km boat ride and hike. 13 meter waterfall. (website (in Russian))
4. Cordon Chelyush - Waterfall. Softwood forest, overviews of Altai. (website (in Russian))
5. Kokshe Waterfall. Orientation by reserve ranger, hike to Kokshe Waterfall on the Koskhe River (largest right bank tributary of Lake Teletskoye. (website (in Russian))
6. Great Falls of the Chulchinsky. Hike for experienced mountain hikers only. (website (in Russian))

== See also ==
- List of Russian Nature Reserves (class 1a "zapovedniks")
- Wikicommons Gallery: Lake Teletskoye
