= Ynyrga =

Ynyrga Ынырга
- Village
- Location within Altai Republic Location within Russia
- Coordinates: 51°49′N 86°47′E
- Country: Russia
- Region: Altai Republic
- District: Choysky District
- Time zone: UTC+7:00

Ynyrga (Russian: Ынырга; Altay: Ыныргы, Inırgı) is a rural locality (a selo) and the administrative centre of Ynyrginskoye Rural Settlement of Choysky District, the Altai Republic, Russia. The population was 516 as of 2016. There are 9 streets.

== Geography ==
Ynyrga is located east from Gorno-Altaysk, in the valley of the Sarakoksha River, 36 km southeast of Choya (the district's administrative centre) by road. Syoyka is the nearest rural locality.
