= Yazula =

Yazula Язула
- Selo
- Location within Altai Republic Location within Russia
- Coordinates: 50°36′N 88°46′E
- Country: Russia
- Region: Altai Republic
- District: Ulagansky District
- Time zone: UTC+7:00

Yazula (Russian: Язула; Altay: Jазулу, Ĵazulu) is a rural locality (a selo) in Ulagansky District, the Altai Republic, Russia. The population was 247 as of 2016. There are 4 streets.

The villagers of Yazula allegedly exhibit extraordinary sight, which they claim comes as a gift from a creature called Almasti. Scientists considered it either a positive mutation caused by isolation in the mountains, or effect of radiation from falling Baikonur Cosmodrome space junk, which also allegedly once killed a cow. Some Yazulan villagers also used Baikonur wrecks to create outhouses. However, very little information about this phenomenon is documented.

== Geography ==
Yazula is located 87 km east of Ulagan (the district's administrative centre) by road. Saratan is the nearest rural locality.
