= Iogach =

Iogach Иогач
- Village
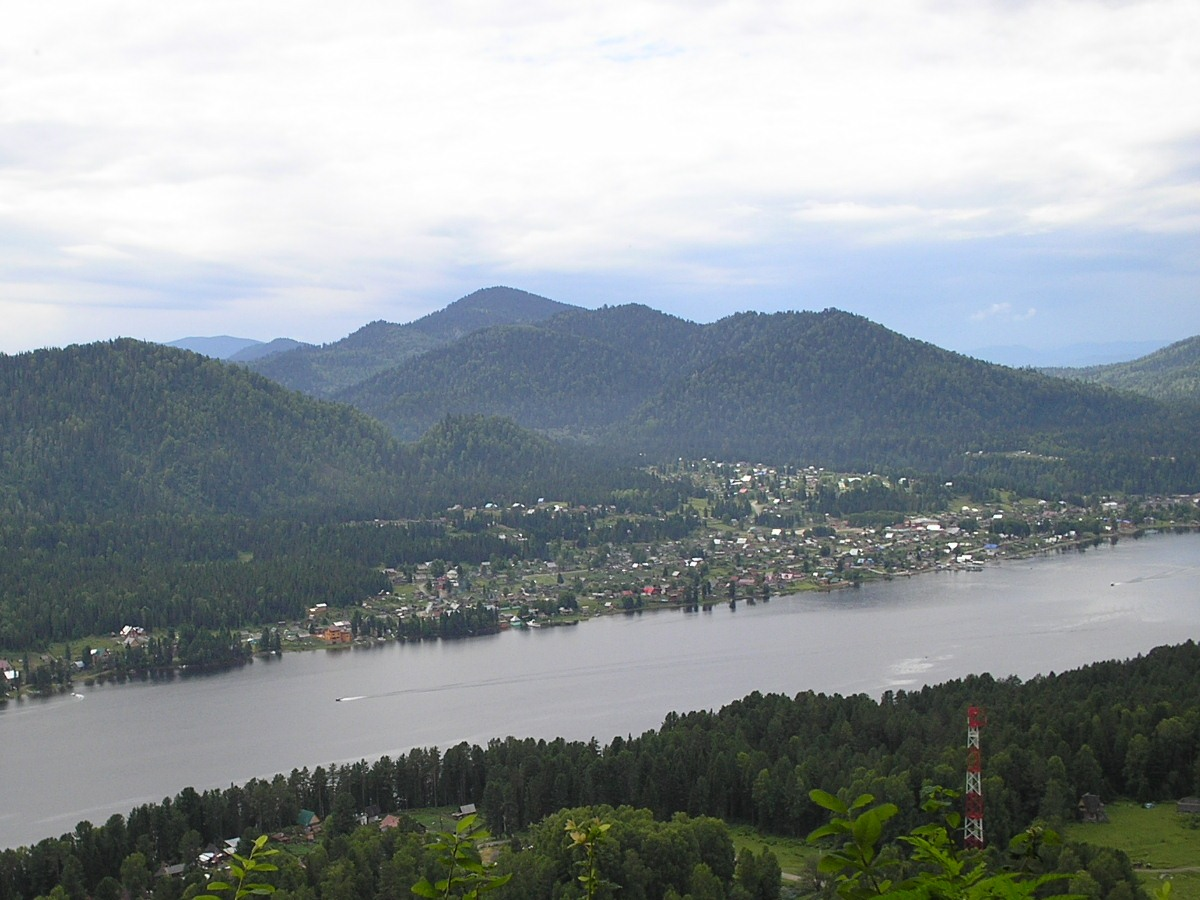
- The village of Iogach

- Location within Altai Republic Location within Russia
- Coordinates: 51°47′N 87°15′E
- Country: Russia
- Region: Altai Republic
- District: Turochaksky District
- Time zone: UTC+7:00

Iogach (Russian: Иогач; Altay: Ыйык-Агаш, Iyık-Agaş) is a rural locality (a selo) in Artybashskoye Rural Settlement of Turochaksky District, the Altai Republic, Russia. The population was 1322 as of 2016. There are 22 streets.

== Geography ==
Iogach is located near the place, where the Yogach River flows into the Biya River, 69 km south of Turochak (the district's administrative centre) by road. Artybash is the nearest rural locality.
