= Tondoshka =

Tondoshka Тондошка
- Village
- Location within Altai Republic Location within Russia
- Coordinates: 52°07′N 87°06′E
- Country: Russia
- Region: Altai Republic
- District: Turochaksky District
- Time zone: UTC+7:00

Tondoshka (Russian: Тондошка; Altay: Тоҥ-Тош, Toñ-Toş) is a rural locality (a selo) in Tondoshenskoye Rural Settlement of Turochaksky District, the Altai Republic, Russia. The population was 294 as of 2016. There are 13 streets.

== Geography ==
Tondoshka is located at the confluence of the Tondoszka and Biya Rivers, 21 km south of Turochak (the district's administrative centre) by road. Sankin Ail is the nearest rural locality.
