= Saratan =

Saratan Саратан
- Selo
- Location within Altai Republic Location within Russia
- Coordinates: 50°31′N 88°15′E
- Country: Russia
- Region: Altai Republic
- District: Ulagansky District
- Time zone: UTC+7:00

Saratan (Russian: Саратан; Altay: Саратан) is a rural locality (a selo) and the administrative centre of Saratanskoye Rural Settlement, Ulagansky District, the Altai Republic, Russia. The population was 749 as of 2016. There are 6 streets.

== Geography ==
Saratan is located 30 km southeast of Ulagan (the district's administrative centre) by road. Ulagan is the nearest rural locality.
