= Artybash =

Artybash Артыбаш
- Settlement
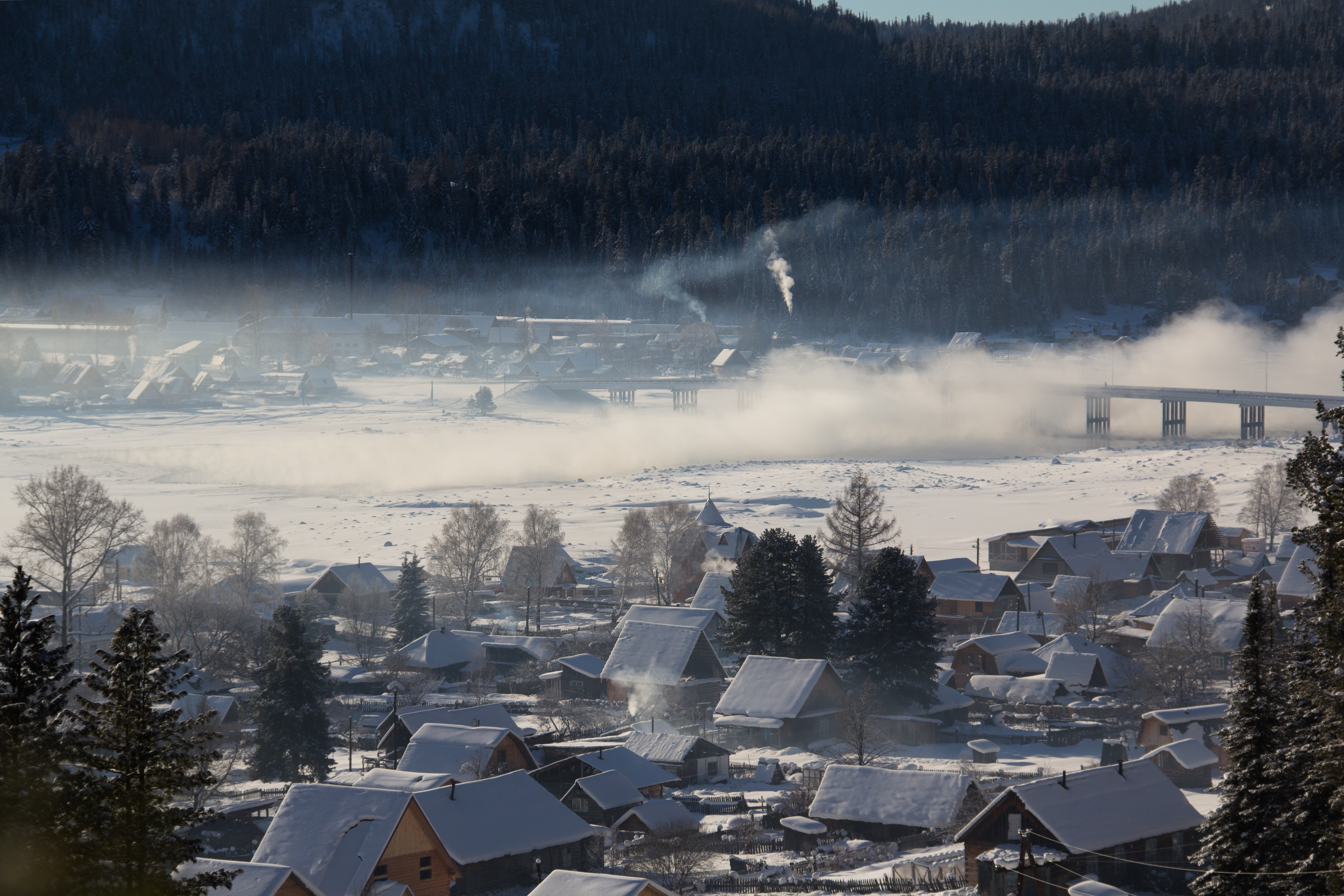

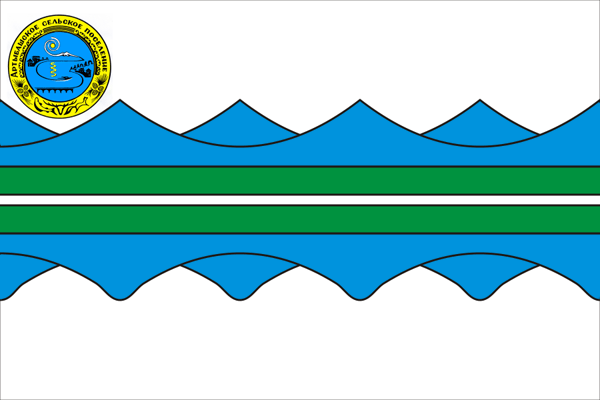
- Flag

- Location within Altai Republic Location within Russia
- Coordinates: 51°47′N 87°15′E
- Country: Russia
- Region: Altai Republic
- District: Turochaksky District
- Time zone: UTC+7:00

Artybash (Russian: Артыбаш; Altay: Артыбаш, Artıbaş) is a rural locality (a settlement) in Artybashskoye Rural Settlement of Turochaksky District, the Altai Republic, Russia. The population was 602 as of 2016. There are 46 streets.

== Geography ==
Artybash is located at the northern end of the Lake Teletskoye at the source of the Biya River, 70 km south of Turochak (the district's administrative centre) by road. Iogach is the nearest rural locality.
