= Kebezen =

Kebezen Кебезень
- Village
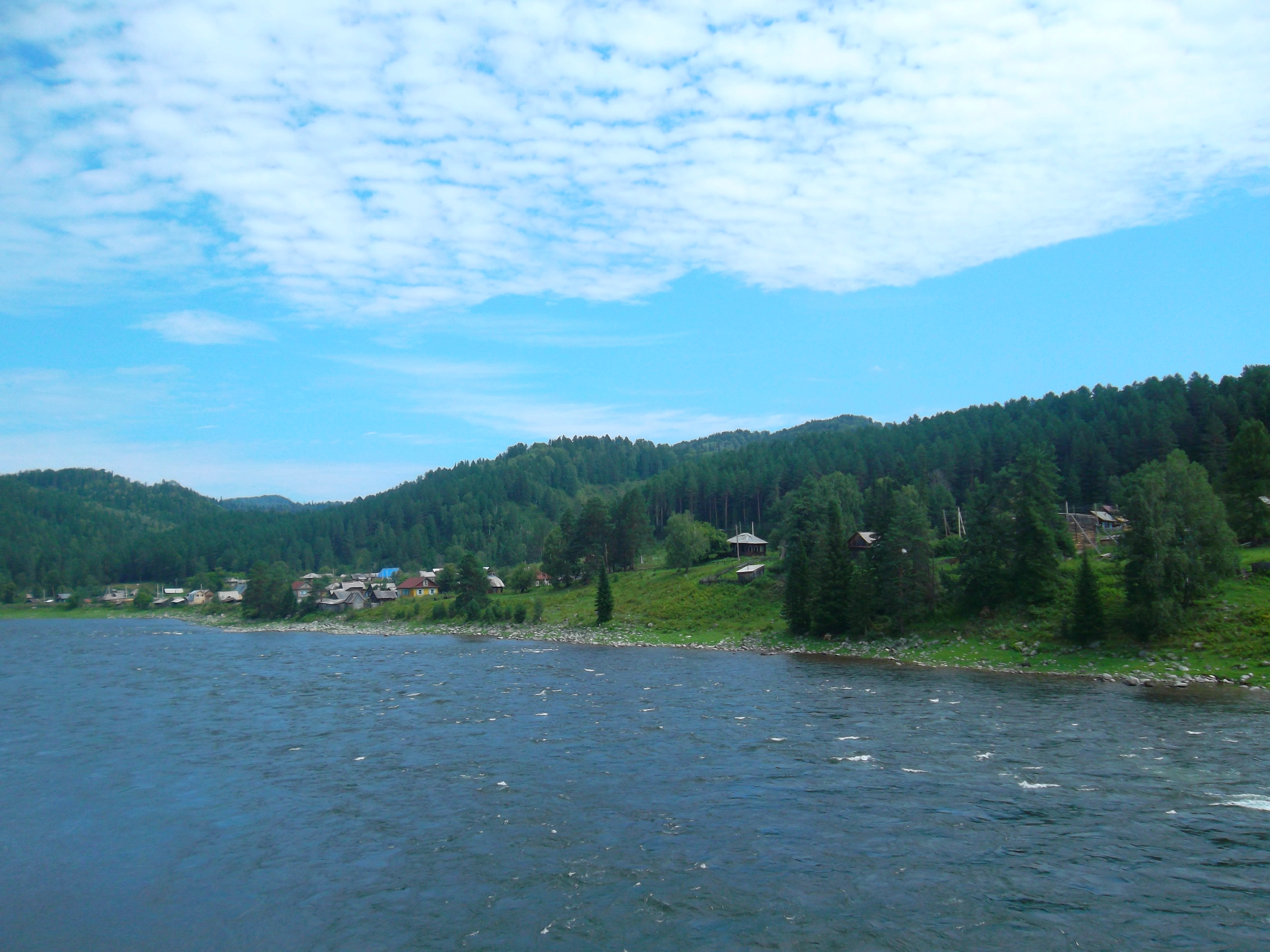

- Location within Altai Republic Location within Russia
- Coordinates: 51°54′N 87°06′E
- Country: Russia
- Region: Altai Republic
- District: Turochaksky District
- Time zone: UTC+7:00

Kebezen (Russian: Кебезень; Altay: Кебезен) is a rural locality (a selo) in Kebezenskoye Rural Settlement of Turochaksky District, the Altai Republic, Russia. The population was 615 as of 2016. There are 19 streets.

== Geography ==
Kebezen is located near the Biya River, 48 km south of Turochak (the district's administrative centre) by road. Stary Kebezen is the nearest rural locality.
