= Uskuch =

Uskuch Ускуч
- Village
- Location within Altai Republic Location within Russia
- Coordinates: 52°02′N 86°54′E
- Country: Russia
- Region: Altai Republic
- District: Choysky District
- Time zone: UTC+7:00

Uskuch (Russian: Ускуч; Altay: Ӱч-Кӧс, Üç-Kös) is a rural locality (a selo) and the administrative centre of Verkh-Pyankovskoye Rural Settlement of Choysky District, the Altai Republic, Russia. The population was 331 as of 2016. There are 6 streets.

== Geography ==
Uskuch is located east from Gorno-Altaysk, in the valley of the Isha River, 30 km east of Choya (the district's administrative centre) by road. Verkh-Biysk is the nearest rural locality.
