= Tunzha =

Tunzha Туньжа
- Village
- Location within Altai Republic Location within Russia
- Coordinates: 52°00′N 86°32′E
- Country: Russia
- Region: Altai Republic
- District: Choysky District
- Time zone: UTC+7:00

Tunzha (Russian: Туньжа; Altay: Тунјы, Tunĵı) is a rural locality (a selo) in Paspaulskoye Rural Settlement of Choysky District, the Altai Republic, Russia. The population was 256 as of 2016. There are 42 streets.

== Geography ==
Tunzha is located east from Gorno-Altaysk, in the valley of the Malaya Isha River, 6 km west of Choya (the district's administrative centre) by road. Choya is the nearest rural locality.
