= Salganda =

Salganda Салганда
- Village
- Location within Altai Republic Location within Russia
- Coordinates: 51°51′N 86°19′E
- Country: Russia
- Region: Altai Republic
- District: Choysky District
- Time zone: UTC+7:00

Salganda (Russian: Салганда; Altay: Салганду, Salgandu) is a rural locality (a selo) in Paspaulskoye Rural Settlement of Choysky District, the Altai Republic, Russia. The population was 31 as of 2016. There are 7 streets.

== Geography ==
The village is located east from Gorno-Altaysk, in the valley of the Malaya Isha River at the confluence of the Salganda and Urgun rivers, 29 km southwest of Choya (the district's administrative centre) by road. Kara-Torbok is the nearest rural locality.
