= Chuyka =

Chuyka Чуйка
- Selo
- Location within Altai Republic Location within Russia
- Coordinates: 51°57′N 87°30′E
- Country: Russia
- Region: Altai Republic
- District: Turochaksky District
- Time zone: UTC+7:00

Chuyka (Russian: Чуйка; Altay: Шуй, Şuy) is a rural locality (a selo) in Turochaksky District, the Altai Republic, Russia. The population was 78 as of 2016. There are 3 streets.

== Geography ==
Chuyka is located 66 km southeast of Turochak (the district's administrative centre) by road. Tuloy and Verkh-Biysk are the nearest rural localities.
