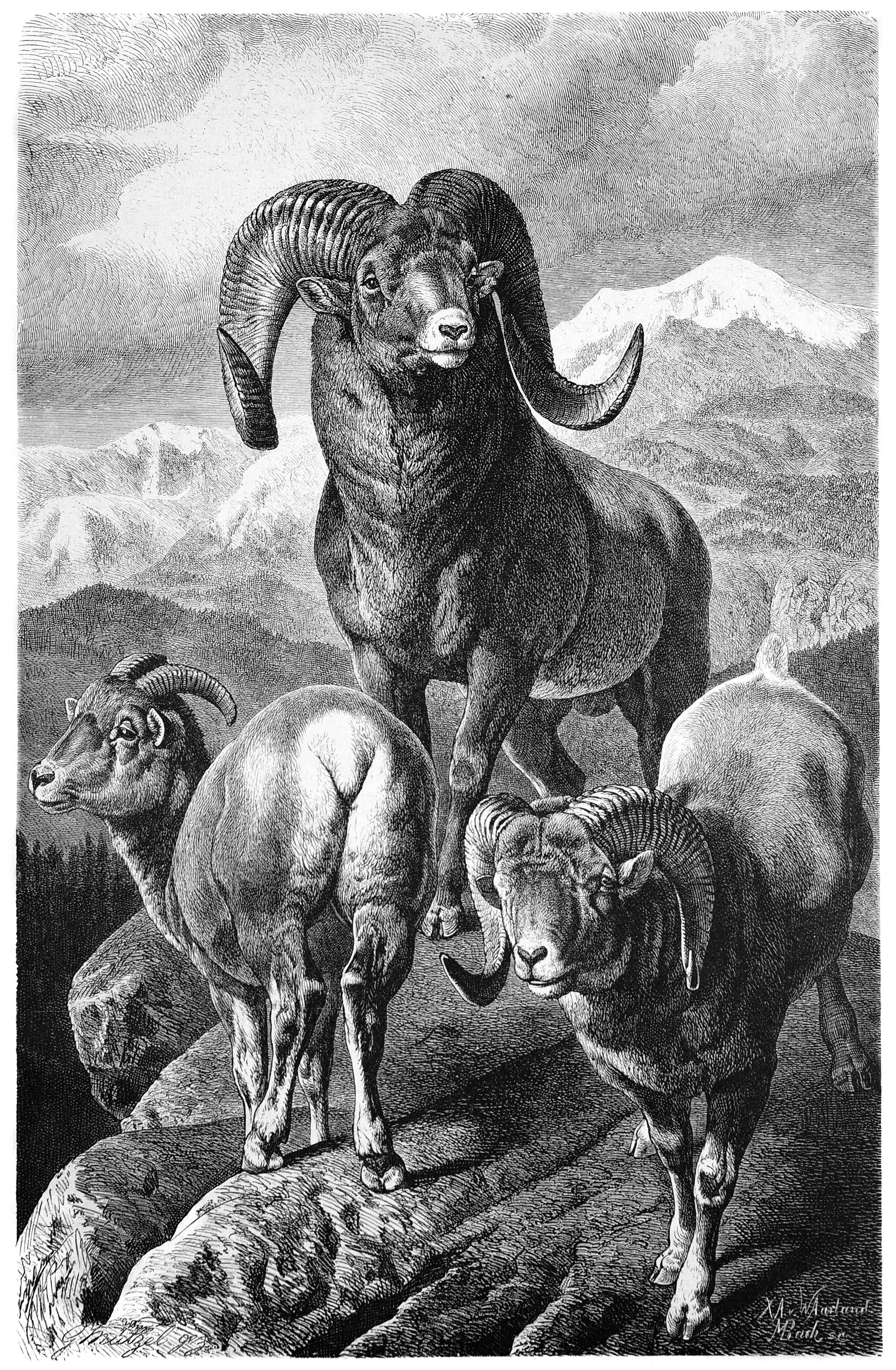
- Argali sheep in Altai

Scientific classification
- Kingdom: Animalia
- Phylum: Chordata
- Class: Mammalia
- Order: Artiodactyla
- Family: Bovidae
- Subfamily: Caprinae
- Tribe: Caprini
- Genus: Ovis
- Species: O. ammon
- Subspecies: O. a. ammon

Trinomial name
- Ovis ammon ammon (Linnaeus, 1758)

= Altai argali =

Subspecies of mammal (wild sheep)

The Altai argali (Ovis ammon ammon) is the nominate subspecies of argali, a large-horned wild sheep. The subspecies is endemic to the highlands of the Altai Mountains of Central Asia.

Altai argali are the largest sheep in the world, and also have some of the heaviest and most elaborate horns. The horns of mature rams normally weigh 45 to 50 pounds, with large rams’ horns weighing up to 75 pounds (35 kg).
