= Lebed (river) =

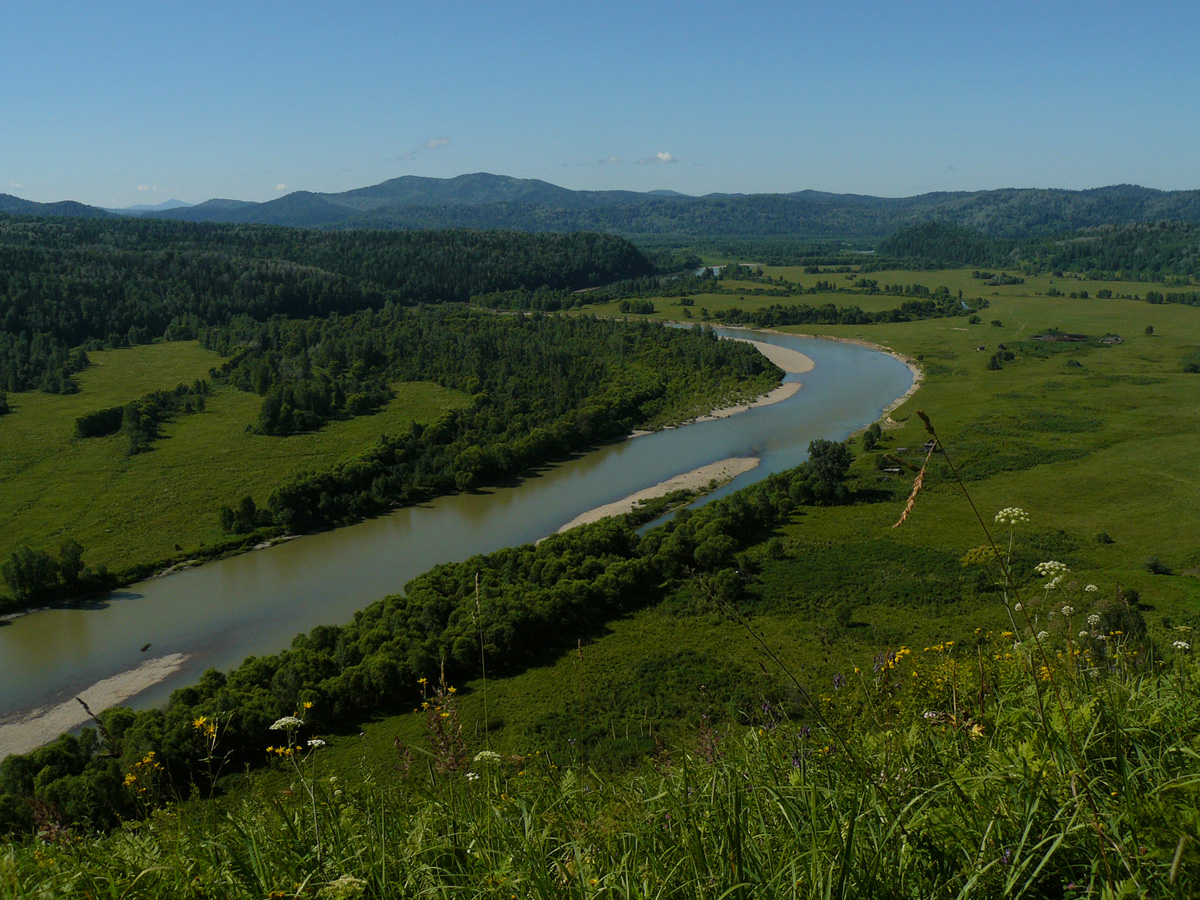

Location
- Country: Russia

Physical characteristics
- Mouth: Biya
  - coordinates: 52.2893°N 87.0261°E
- Length: 175 km (109 mi)
- Basin size: 4,500 km^{2} (1,700 sq mi)

Basin features
- Progression: Biya→ Ob→ Kara Sea

The Lebed (Russian: Лебедь; Altay: Куу, Kuu) is a river in Siberia in eastern Russia, a right tributary of the Biya. Its source is in the Abakan Range (a northern continuation of the Altai Mountains), and it flows through the Altai Republic. It is 175 kilometres (109 mi) long, and has a drainage basin of 4,500 square kilometres (1,700 sq mi).
