= Ulagansky District =

Ulagansky District Улаганский район (Russian)
- District

Other transcription(s)
  - Altay: Улаган аймак
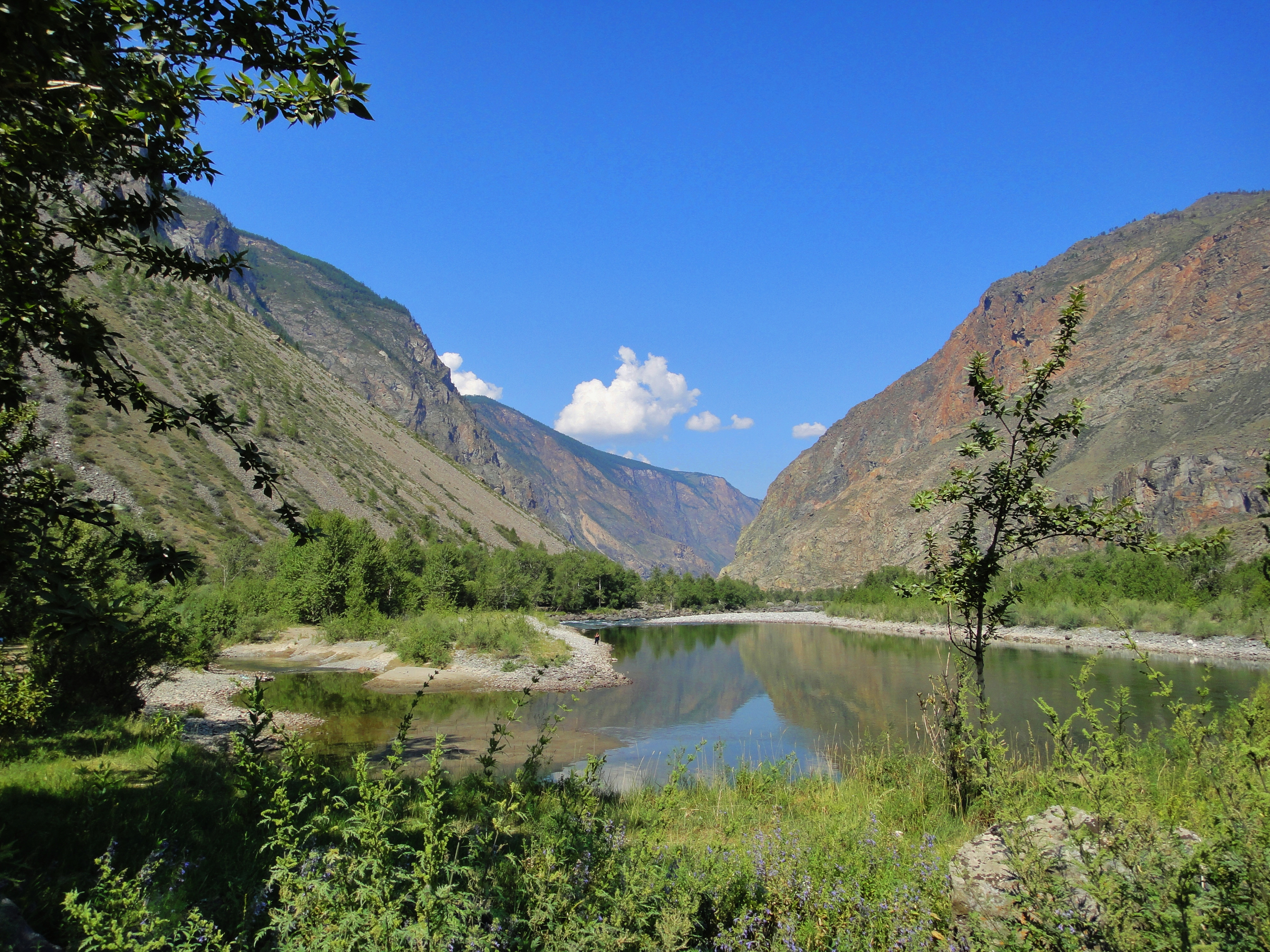
- Chulyshman River area, a protected area of Russia in Ulagansky District

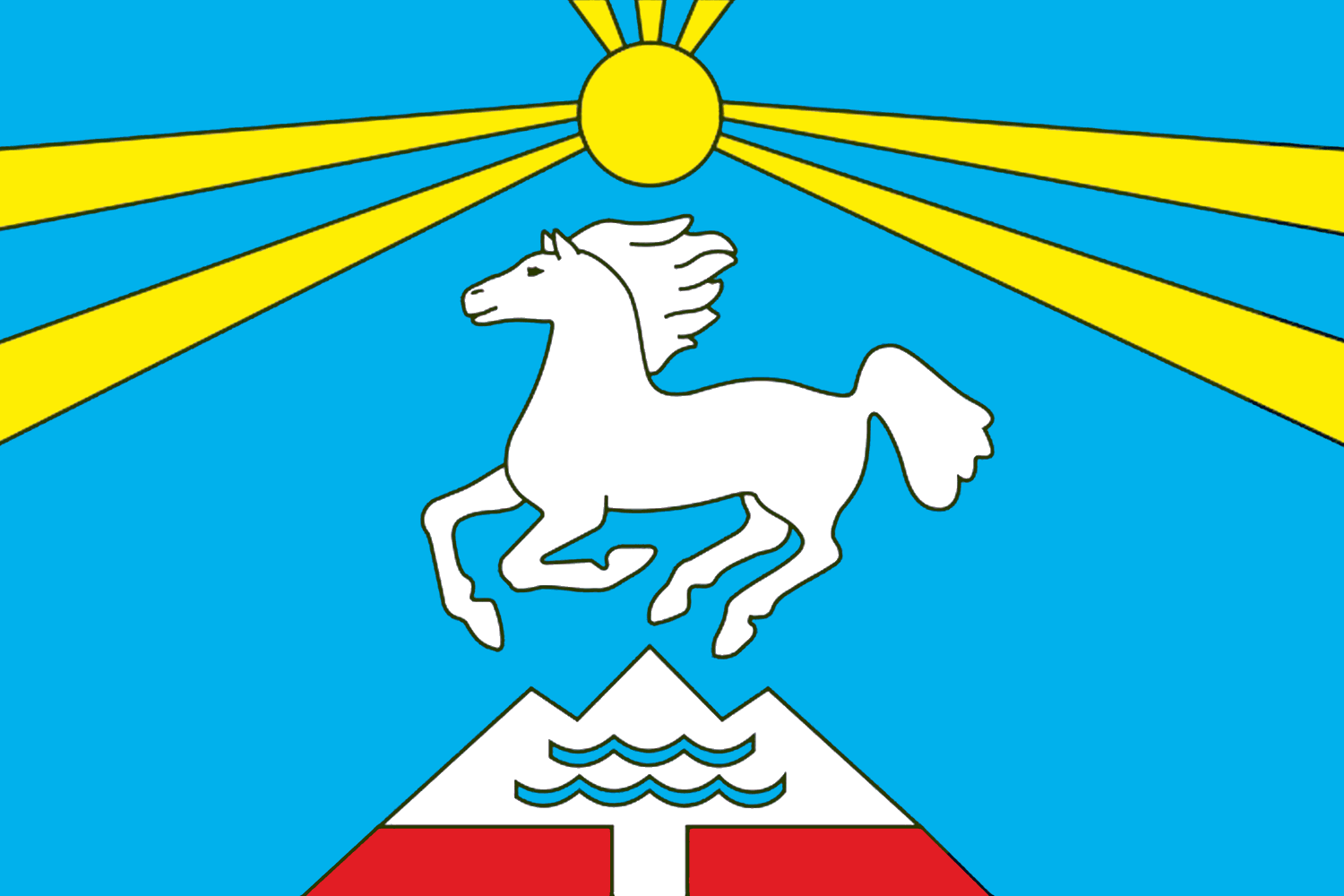
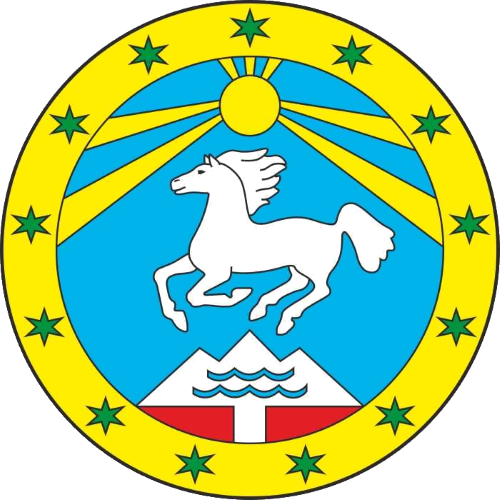
- Flag Coat of arms
- Location of Ulagansky District in the Altai Republic
- Coordinates: 51°57′N 85°57′E
- Country: Russia
- Federal subject: Altai Republic
- Established: October 19, 1923
- Administrative center: Ulagan

Area
  - Total: 18,367 km^{2} (7,092 sq mi)

Population (2010 Census)
  - Total: 11,388
  - Density: 0.62003/km^{2} (1.6059/sq mi)
  - Urban: 0%
  - Rural: 100%

Administrative structure
  - Administrative divisions: 7 Rural settlements
  - Inhabited localities: 13 rural localities

Municipal structure
  - Municipally incorporated as: Ulagansky Municipal District
  - Municipal divisions: 0 urban settlements, 7 rural settlements
- Time zone: UTC+6 (MSK+3)
- OKTMO ID: 84630000
- Website: http://улаган-адм.рф

Population of Ulagansky District
- 2010 Census: 11,388
- 2002 Census: 11,581
- 1989 Census: 11,176
- 1979 Census: 9,323

Ulagansky District (Russian: Улага́нский райо́н; Altay: Улаган аймак, Ulagan aymak) is an administrative and municipal district (raion), one of the ten in the Altai Republic, Russia. It is located in the east of the republic and borders Turochaksky District, Choysky District, Ongudaysky District, and Kosh-Agachsky District, as well as the republics of Tuva and Khakassia. The area of the district is 18,367 square kilometers (7,092 sq mi). Its administrative center is the rural locality (a selo) of Ulagan. As of the 2010 Census, the total population of the district was 11,388, with the population of Ulagan accounting for 28.3% of that number. Altai make up 57.2% of the district's population, followed by Russians (20.2%), Telengits (16.3%), Kazakhs (4.5%) and Uzbeks (1.8%).

== Geography ==
The district is located in a mountainous area, away from major roads. A large part of the district along the mountainous eastern border is in the Altai Nature Reserve. The mountainous topography of the region, like the rest of the Altai Mountains, was created by tectonic movements of the Paleozoic age, more than 300-600 million years ago.

== History ==
The district was established on October 19, 1923 within Oirot Autonomous Oblast.

== Administrative and municipal status ==
Within the framework of administrative divisions, Ulagansky District is one of the ten in the Altai Republic. As a municipal division, the district is incorporated as Ulagansky Municipal District. Both administrative and municipal districts are divided into the same seven rural settlements, comprising thirteen rural localities. The selo of Ulagan serves as the administrative center of both the administrative and municipal district.
