= Chulyshman =

River in Russia

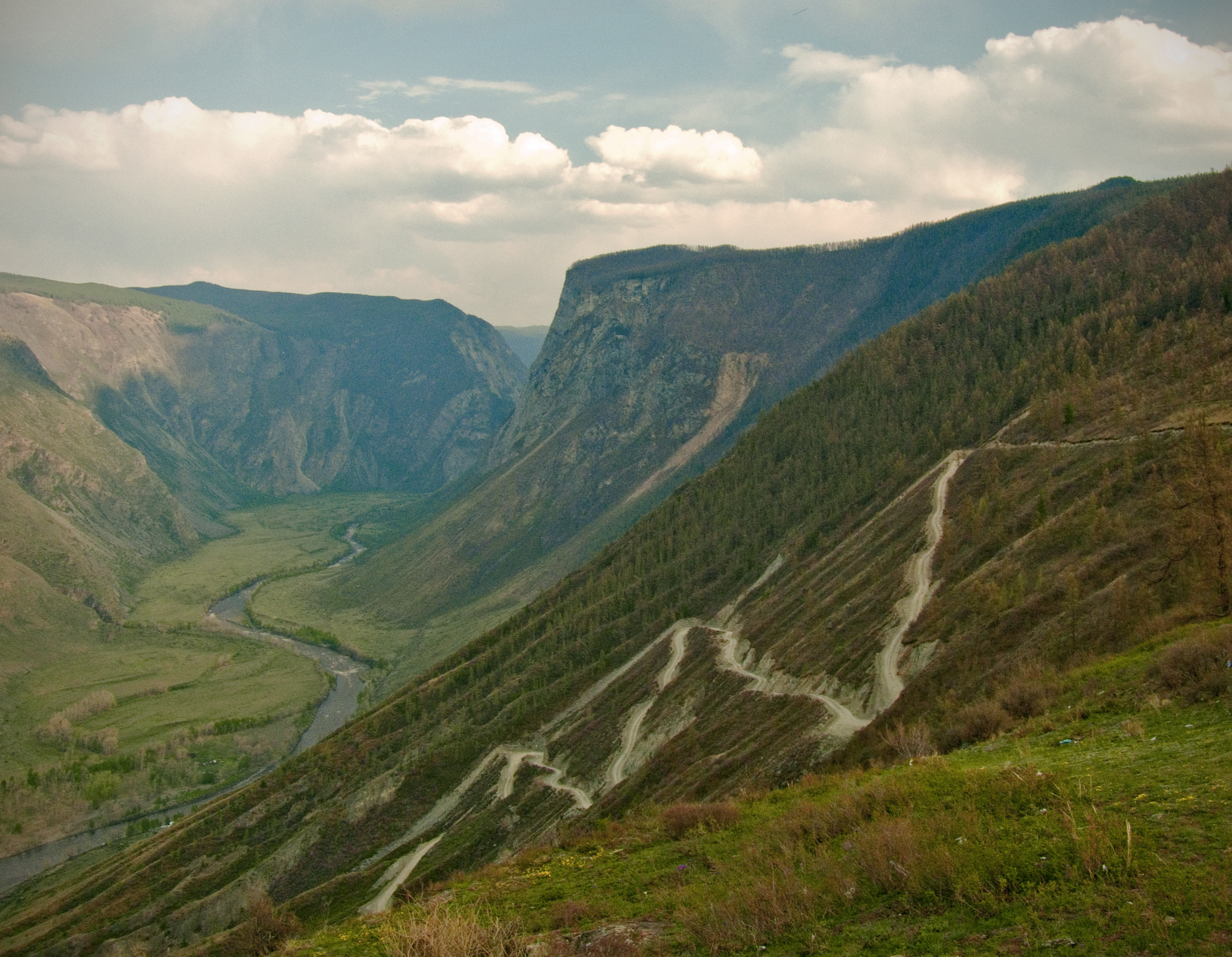
- View from Katu-Yaryk pass

Physical characteristics
- Source: Lake Dzhulukul
  - coordinates: 50°13′15″N 89°38′09″E
  - elevation: 2,200 m (7,200 ft)
- Mouth: Lake Teletskoye
  - coordinates: 51°21′N 87°46′E
- Length: 241 km (150 mi)
- Basin size: 16,800 km^{2} (6,500 sq mi)

Basin features
- Progression: Lake Teletskoye→ Biya→ Ob→ Kara Sea

The Chulyshman (Russian: Чулышман; Altay: Чолышман, Çolışman) is a river in Altai Republic in Russia. The river is 241 kilometres (150 mi) long, and its drainage basin covers 16,800 square kilometres (6,500 mi^{2}). The Chulyshman flows into Lake Teletskoye. It freezes up during late October through early December and stays icebound until late March through early May. Its main tributary is the Bashkaus.
