= Choya, Russia =

Choya Чоя
- Selo

Other transcription(s)
  - Altay: Чоо
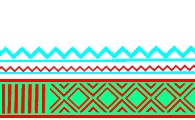
- Flag
- Interactive map of Choya
- Location of Choya Choya (Altai Republic)
- Coordinates: 52°00′46″N 86°32′52″E
- Country: Russia
- Federal subject: Altai Republic
- Administrative district: Choysky District
- SelsovietSelsoviet: Choysky

Population (2010 Census)
  - Total: 1,916
  - Estimate (2016): 1,948 (+1.7%)

Administrative status
  - Capital of: Choysky District, Choysky Selsoviet

Municipal status
  - Municipal district: Choysky Municipal District
  - Rural settlement: Choyskoye Rural Settlement
  - Capital of: Choysky Municipal District, Choyskoye Rural Settlement
- Time zone: UTC+6 (MSK+3)
- Postal code: 649180
- OKTMO ID: 84645460101

Choya (Russian: Чоя, Altay: Чоо, Çoo) is a rural locality (a selo) and the administrative center of Choysky District of the Altai Republic, Russia. Population: 1,916 (2010 census); 1,919 (2002 census); 1,831 (1989 Soviet census).
