= Lake Teletskoye =

Lake in Russia

- Алтын Кӧл (Altay); Altyn-Köl
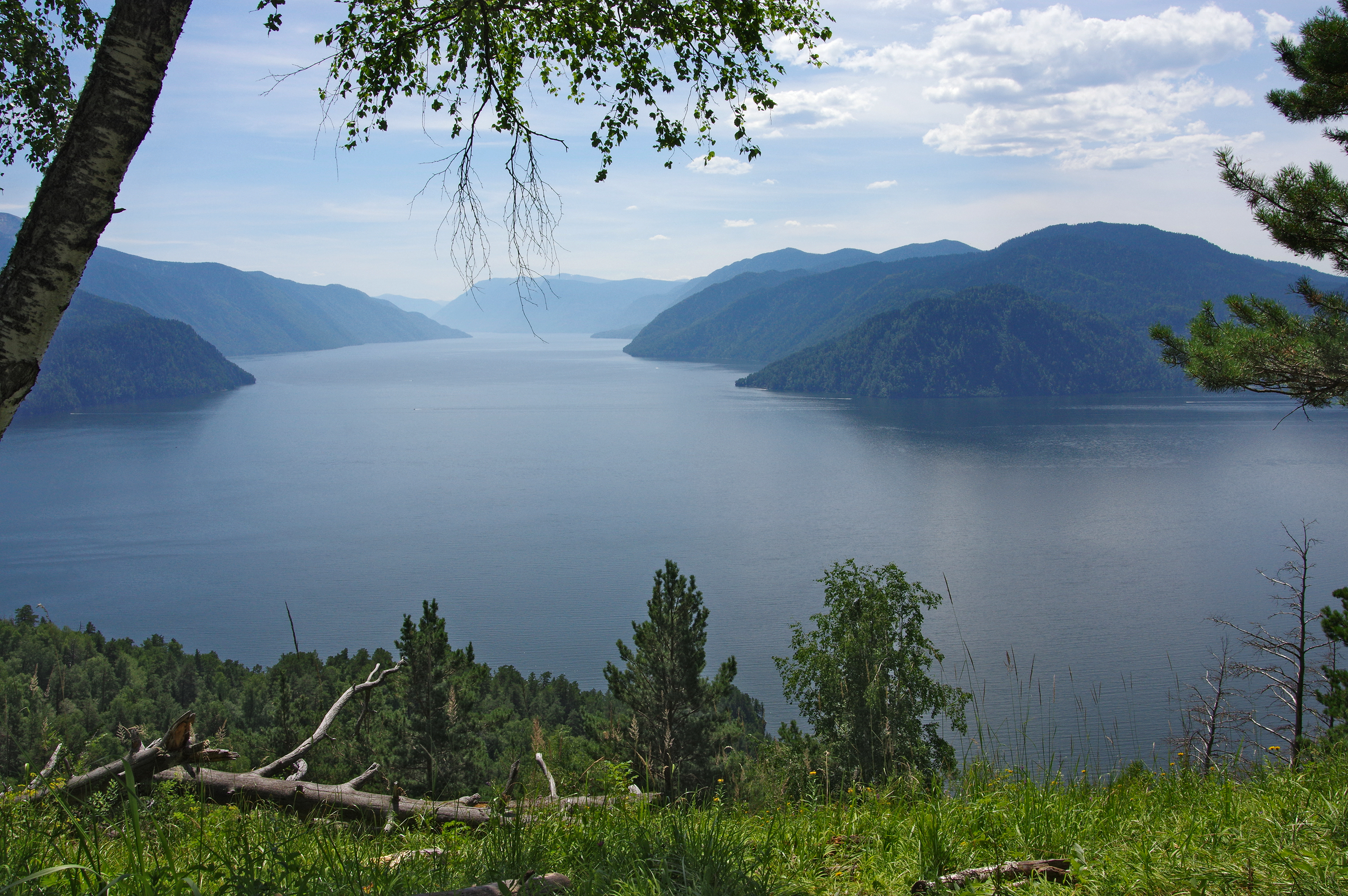
- The lake from its northern bank

- Location in Russia
- Location: Altai Republic
- Coordinates: 51°31′45″N 87°42′53″E
- Primary inflows: Chulyshman; 70 other smaller rivers and 150 temporary streams
- Primary outflows: Biya
- Basin countries: Russia
- Max. length: 78 km (48 mi)
- Max. width: 5 km (3.1 mi)
- Surface area: 233 km^{2} (90 sq mi)
- Average depth: 174 m (571 ft)
- Max. depth: 325 m (1,066 ft)
- Water volume: 40.54 km^{3} (9.73 cu mi)
- Surface elevation: 434 m (1,424 ft)
- Settlements: Artybash

Lake Teletskoye (Russian: Телецкое озеро, lit. 'the lake of the Tyolyos'; Altay: Алтын Кӧл, romanized: Altın Köl, lit. 'Golden Lake') is the largest lake in the Altai Mountains and the Altai Republic, Russia, and has depth up to 325 meters.

Situated at a height of 434 m (1,424 ft) above the sea level, the lake is 78 km (48 mi) long and 5 km (3.1 mi) wide and lies between the mountain ridges Korbu and Al-tyntu, on the junction of the Sailughem Mountains and the Western Sayans. Its surface area is 233 km^{2} (90 sq mi); however, due to its considerable depth (325 m; 1,066 ft), the lake contains no less than 40 km^{3} (9.6 mi^{3}) of fresh water. Annual water level fluctuations are estimated at some 348 sm. The lake transparency is high, with the visibility of the lake water ranging from six to fourteen meters.

About 70 rivers and 150 temporary streams flow into the lake, the largest of them, Chulyshman River, supplying more than half of the lake's water. The lake is drained through a single outlet, the Biya River, which, after its confluence with the Katun River, forms one of Siberia's largest rivers, the Ob River.

The lake is surrounded by mountains of 600–1,300 m in the northern part and about 1,700–2,400 m (5,600–7,900 ft) in the southern part. Lake Teletskoe is included into Altaisky Nature Reserve. That reserve along with the Katun Nature Reserve and the Ukok Plateau Nature Refuge were listed as one of UNESCO World Natural Heritage Sites under the name "Golden Mountains of Altai".

The Altai people have a legend about the name of the lake in their language, which means Golden Lake. According to this story, once, a rich man had an ingot of gold, which he wanted to use to buy food. He travelled around Altai, but could not find anyone who would sell him any food. Eventually, he threw the gold into the lake. This legend is the origin of the name.

== Research ==
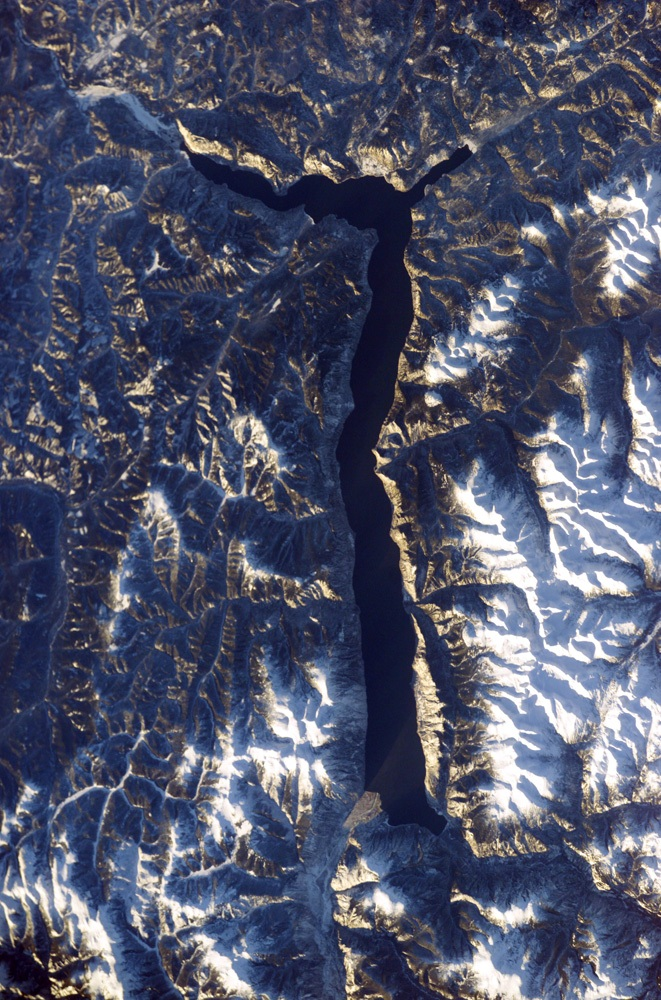
The lake from space, 2003.

There is a field base of Institute of Taxonomy and Ecology of Animals (Russian: Институт систематики и экологии животных СО РАН) by the Siberian Division of the Russian Academy of Sciences (Russian: Сибирское отделение Российской академии наук) at the northwest part of the lake, about 6 km from head water of Biya River. Therein studies are performed of the insect-eaters and rodents of Altai Republic, helminthofauna of vertebrates in biocenoses of taiga, ichthyocenose and animal plankton of Lake Teletskoye. Near the base there is located the research-and-production sport-and-sanitary base of Gorno-Altaisk State University. Tomsk State University has been conducting scientific research in the area for more than 50 years. Ecologists, geologists, and archeologists from Institute of Water and Ecological Problems (Russian: Институт водных и экологических проблем СО РАН) the Siberian Division of the Russian Academy of Sciences from the Institute of Water and Ecological Problems spend many years working here to study the lake and surrounding area. Geomorphologists and geologists scrutinize geological structure of Lake Teletskoye, its paleogeography, age, and origin.

It has been known for a long time that there are gold in placers and bedrock deposits in the Altai. The Geomorphologists from Tomsk State University works in the Teletskoye geology-prospecting detachment searching for gold-placers. They managed to establish a new search criterion for a placer. The base for the discovery were the palaeoglaciological studies during the last few years and theoretical models of the diluvial morpholithogenesis.
