= Choysky District =

Choysky District Чойский район (Russian)
- District

Other transcription(s)
  - Altay: Чоя аймак
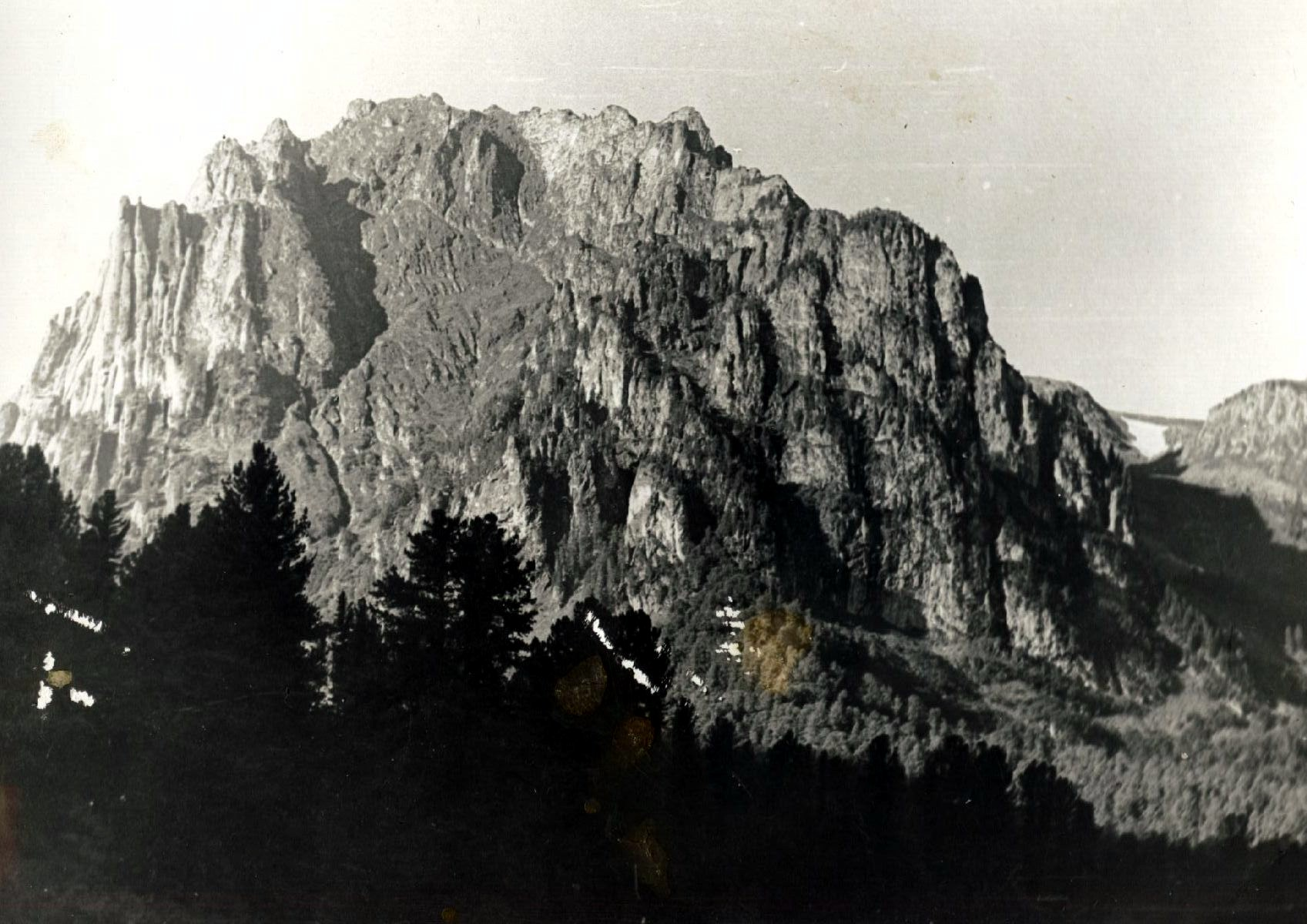
- Chyorny Alpinist Rock near Lake Uymen in Choysky District

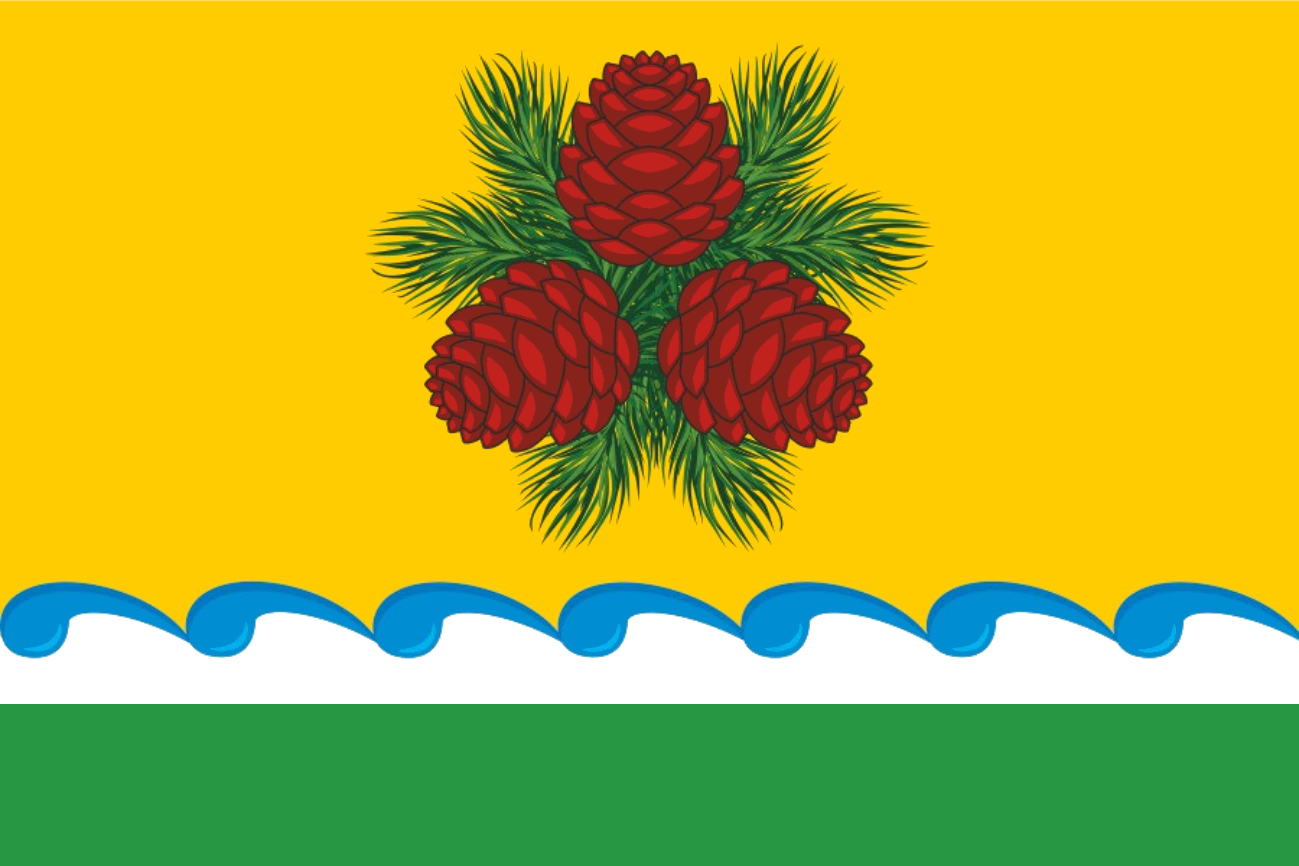
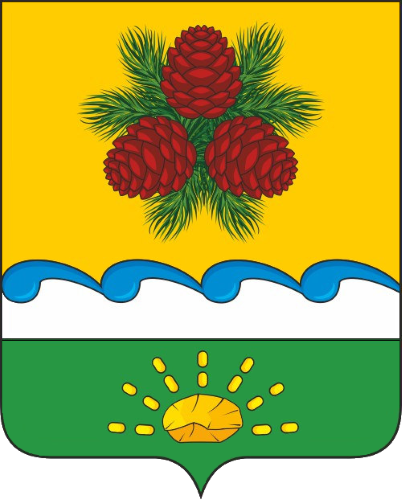
- Flag Coat of arms
- Location of Choysky District in the Altai Republic
- Coordinates: 51°43′N 86°33′E
- Country: Russia
- Federal subject: Altai Republic
- Established: October 20, 1980
- Administrative center: Choya

Government
  - Type: Local government
  - Head: Alexander Borisov

Area
  - Total: 4,526 km^{2} (1,747 sq mi)

Population (2010 Census)
  - Total: 8,348
  - Density: 1.844/km^{2} (4.777/sq mi)
  - Urban: 0%
  - Rural: 100%

Administrative structure
  - Administrative divisions: 7 Rural settlements
  - Inhabited localities: 21 rural localities

Municipal structure
  - Municipally incorporated as: Choysky Municipal District
  - Municipal divisions: 0 urban settlements, 7 rural settlements
- Time zone: UTC+6 (MSK+3)
- OKTMO ID: 84645000
- Website: http://www.чойский-район.рф

Population of Choysky District
- 2010 Census: 8,348
- 2002 Census: 8,986
- 1989 Census: 9,060

Choysky District (Russian: Чо́йский райо́н; Altay: Чоо аймак, Çoo aymak) is an administrative and municipal district (raion), one of the ten in the Altai Republic, Russia. It is located in the north of the republic. The district covers 4,526 square kilometers (1,747 sq mi). Its administrative center is the rural locality (a selo) of Choya. As of the 2010 Census, the district's total population was 8,348, with Choya accounting for 23.0% of that number.

== History ==
The district was established on October 20, 1980.

== Administrative and municipal status ==
Within the framework of administrative divisions, Choysky District is one of the ten in the Altai Republic. As a municipal division, the district is incorporated as Choysky Municipal District. Both administrative and municipal districts are divided into the same seven rural settlements, comprising twenty-one rural localities. The selo of Choya serves as the administrative center of both the administrative and municipal district.
