= Ulagan =

Ulagan Улаган
- Selo

Other transcription(s)
  - Altay: Улаган
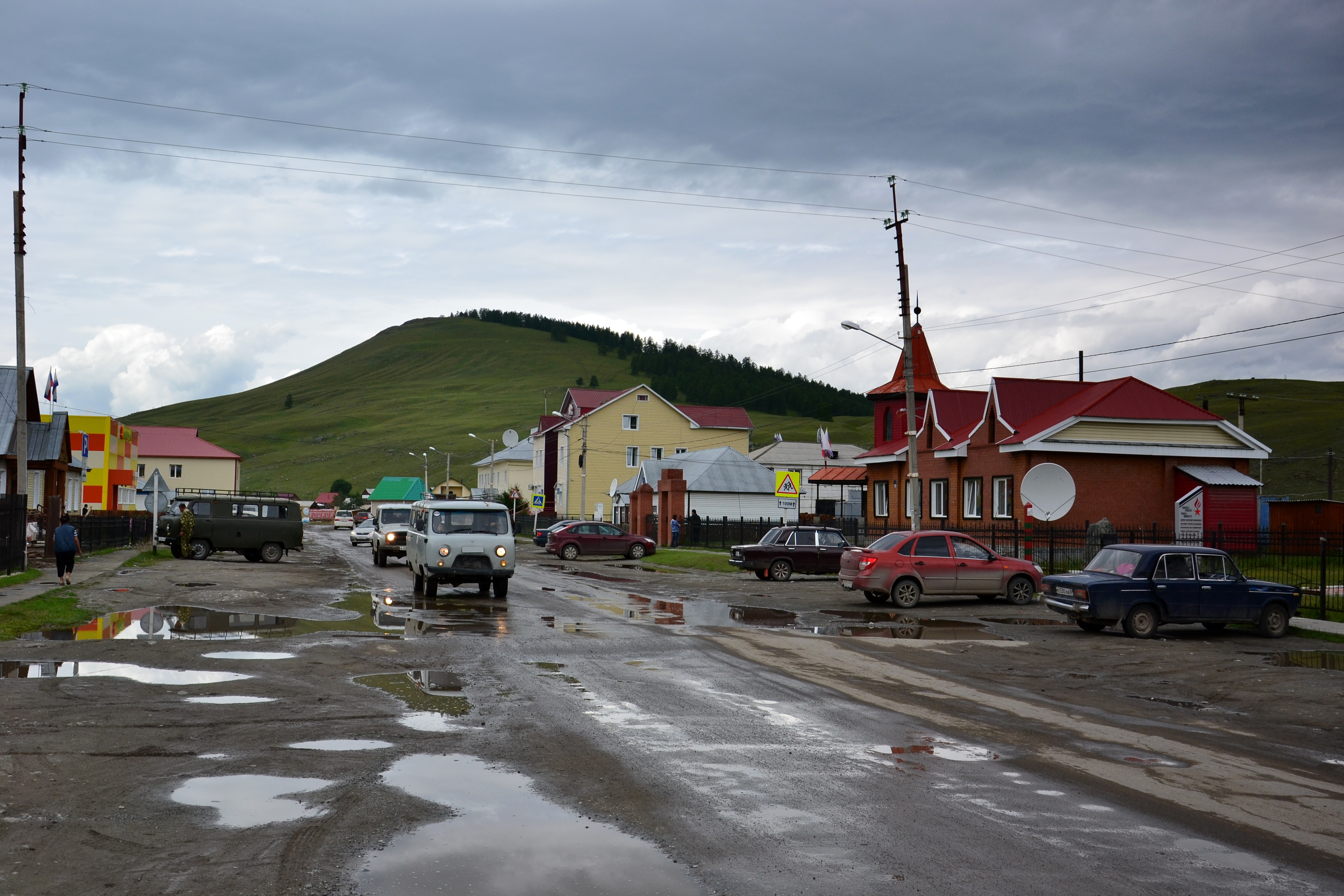

- Flag
- Interactive map of Ulagan
- Location of Ulagan Ulagan (Altai Republic)
- Coordinates: 50°37′56″N 87°57′35″E
- Country: Russia
- Federal subject: Altai Republic
- Administrative district: Ulagansky District
- SelsovietSelsoviet: Ulagansky

Population (2010 Census)
  - Total: 3,222
  - Estimate (2025): 4,532 (+40.7%)

Administrative status
  - Capital of: Ulagansky District, Ulagansky Selsoviet

Municipal status
  - Municipal district: Ulagansky Municipal District
  - Rural settlement: Ulaganskoye Rural Settlement
  - Capital of: Ulagansky Municipal District, Ulaganskoye Rural Settlement
- Time zone: UTC+6 (MSK+3)
- Postal code: 649750
- OKTMO ID: 84630435101

Ulagan (Russian: Улага́н, Altay: Улаган, romanized: Ulağan) is a rural locality (a selo) and the administrative center of Ulagansky District of the Altai Republic, Russia. Population: 3,222 (2010 census); 2,609 (2002 census); 2,045 (1989 Soviet census).
