= Turochaksky District =

Turochaksky District Турочакский район (Russian)
- District

Other transcription(s)
  - Altay: Турачак аймак
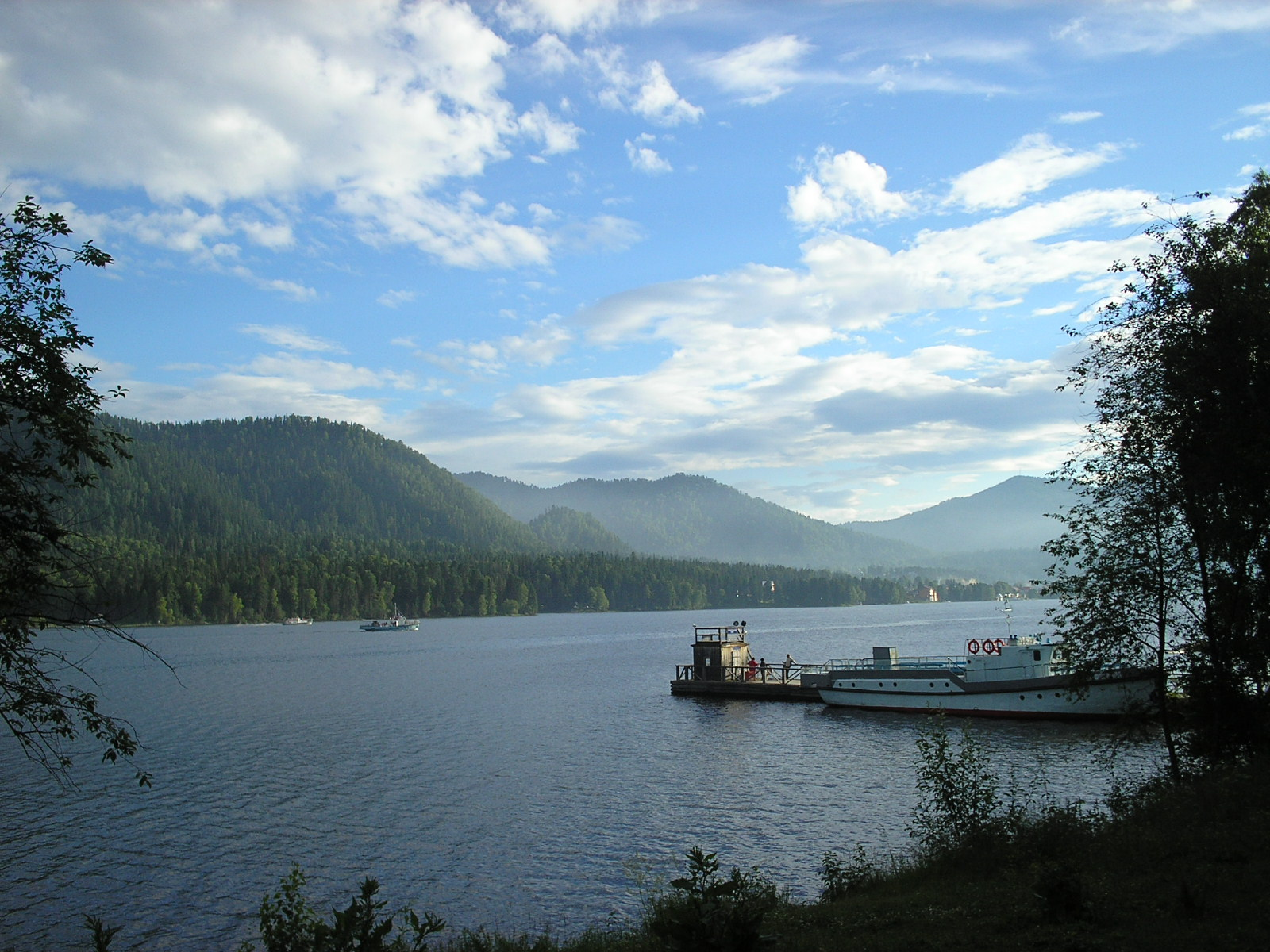
- Lake Teletskoye near the selo of Artybash in Turochaksky District

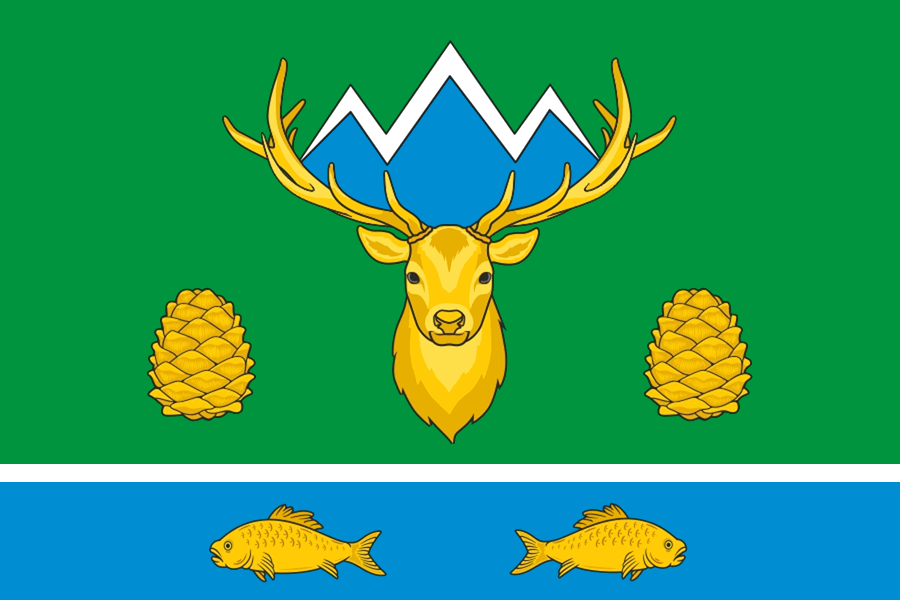
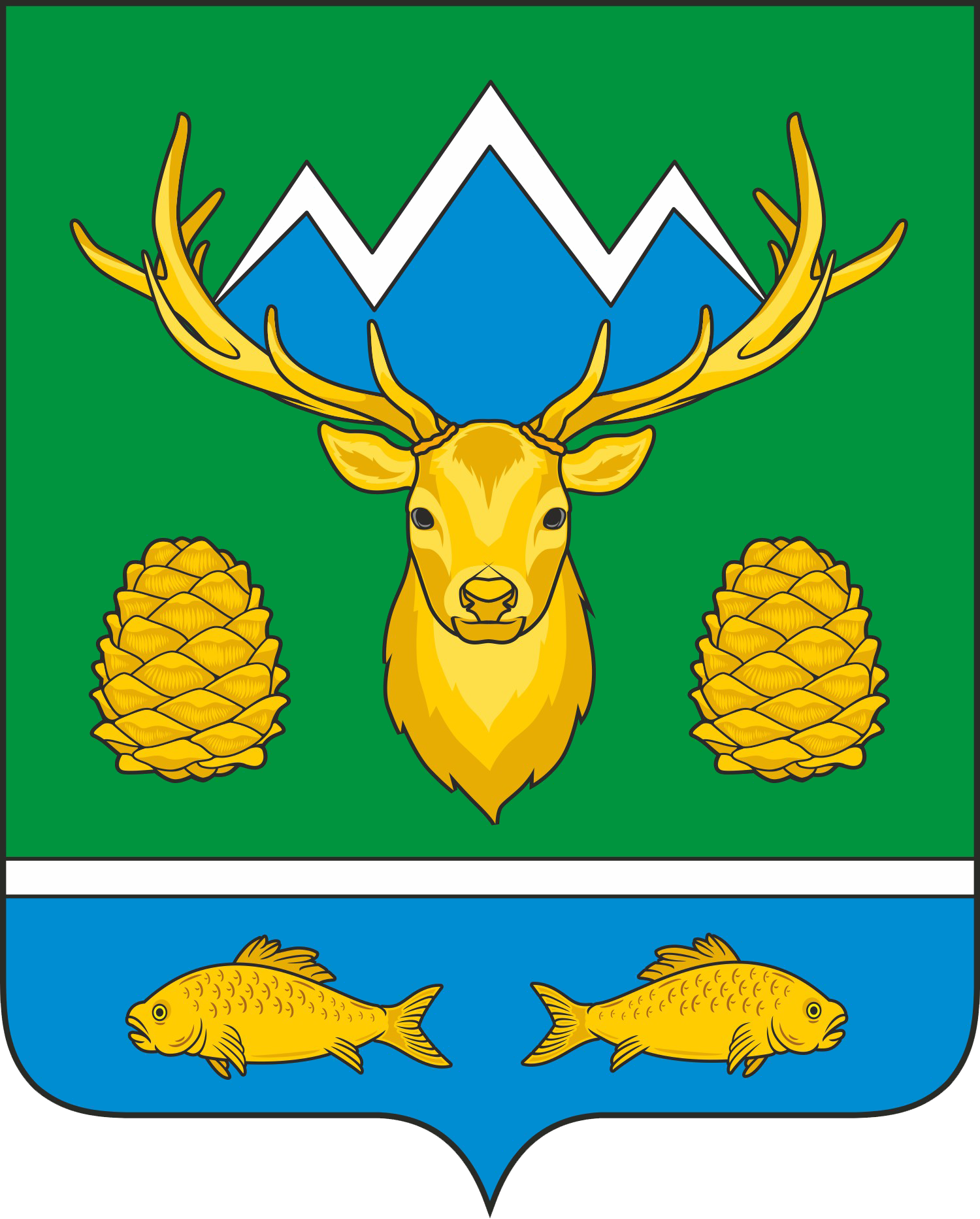
- Flag Coat of arms
- Location of Turochaksky District on the map of Altai Republic
- Coordinates: 52°15′N 87°07′E
- Country: Russia
- Federal subject: Altai Republic
- Administrative center: Turochak

Area
  - Total: 11,015 km^{2} (4,253 sq mi)

Population (2010 Census)
  - Total: 12,484
  - Density: 1.1334/km^{2} (2.9354/sq mi)
  - Urban: 0%
  - Rural: 100%

Administrative structure
  - Administrative divisions: 9 Rural settlements
  - Inhabited localities: 32 rural localities

Municipal structure
  - Municipally incorporated as: Turochaksky Municipal District
  - Municipal divisions: 0 urban settlements, 9 rural settlements
- Time zone: UTC+6 (MSK+3)
- OKTMO ID: 84625000
- Website: https://www.turochak-altai.ru/

Population of Turochaksky District
- 2010 Census: 12,484
- 2002 Census: 13,168
- 1989 Census: 13,679
- 1979 Census: 13,552

Turochaksky District (Russian: Туроча́кский райо́н; Altay: Турачак аймак, Turaçak aymak) is an administrative and municipal district (raion), one of the ten in the Altai Republic, Russia. It is located in the north of the republic. The area of the district is 11,015 square kilometers (4,253 sq mi). Its administrative center is the rural locality (a selo) of Turochak. As of the 2010 Census, the total population of the district was 12,484, with the population of Turochak accounting for 44.7% of that number.

== Administrative and municipal status ==
Within the framework of administrative divisions, Turochaksky District is one of the ten in the Altai Republic. As a municipal division, the district is incorporated as Turochaksky Municipal District. Both administrative and municipal districts are divided into the same nine rural settlements, comprising thirty-two rural localities. The selo of Turochak serves as the administrative center of both the administrative and municipal district.
