= Turochak =

Turochak Турочак
- Selo

Other transcription(s)
  - Altay: Турачак
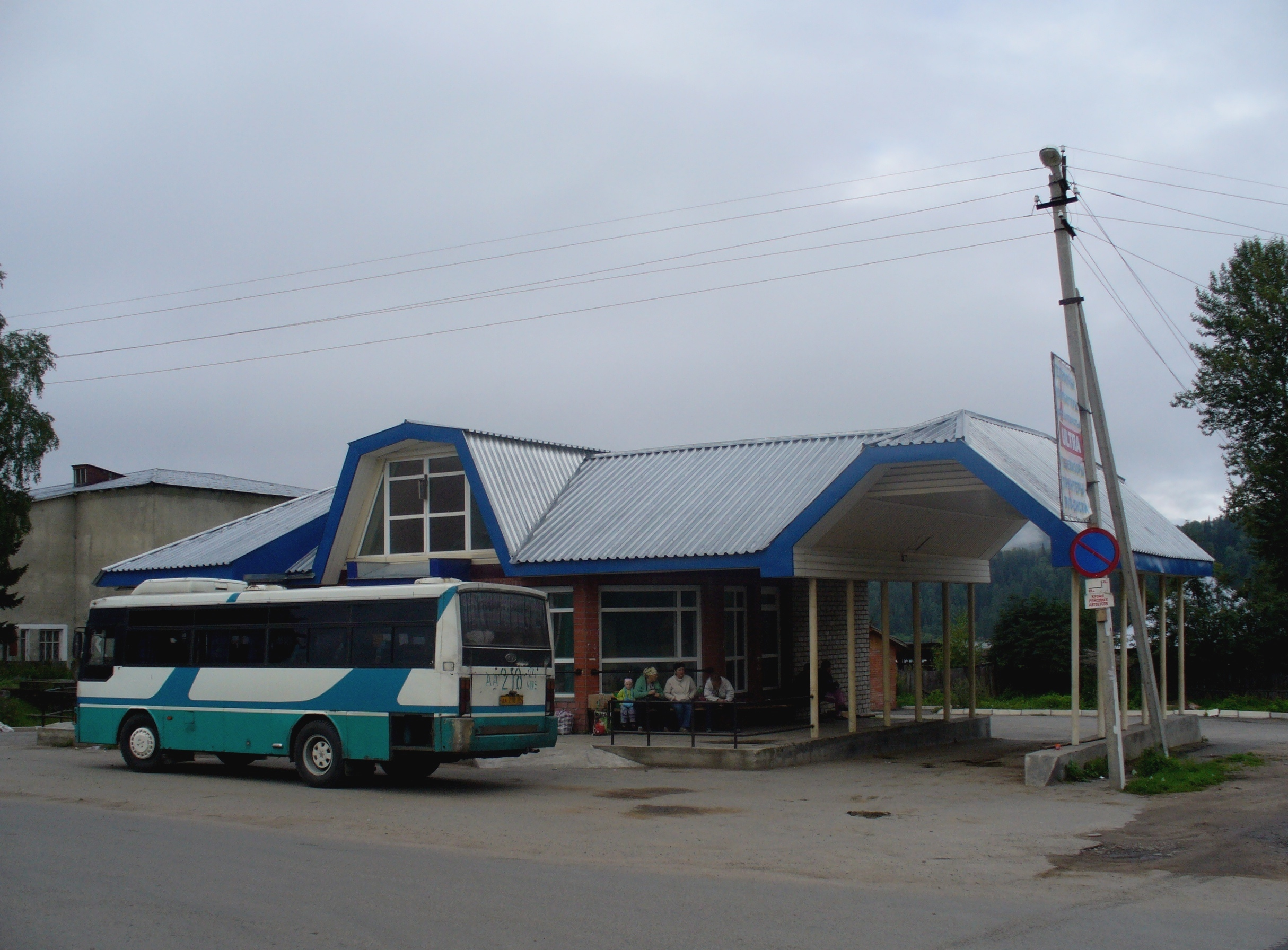
- Turochak bus station
- Interactive map of Turochak
- Location of Turochak Turochak (Altai Republic)
- Coordinates: 52°15′17″N 87°06′57″E
- Country: Russia
- Federal subject: Altai Republic
- Administrative district: Turochaksky District
- SelsovietSelsoviet: Turochaksky
- Founded: 1840

Population (2010 Census)
  - Total: 5,582
  - Estimate (2021): 5,250 (−5.9%)

Administrative status
  - Capital of: Turochaksky District, Turochaksky Selsoviet

Municipal status
  - Municipal district: Turochaksky Municipal District
  - Rural settlement: Turochakskoye Rural Settlement
  - Capital of: Turochaksky Municipal District, Turochakskoye Rural Settlement
- Time zone: UTC+6 (MSK+3)
- Postal code: 649140
- OKTMO ID: 84625475101

Turochak (Russian: Туроча́к, Kumandin: Турачак, Turaçak) is a rural locality (a selo) and the administrative center of Turochaksky District of the Altai Republic, Russia. Population: 5,582 (2010 census); 5,484 (2002 census); 5,080 (1989 Soviet census).

== Climate ==
Turochak has a humid continental climate (Köppen climate classification Dfb), typified by extreme variation in seasonal temperatures, with warm, humid summers and severely cold winters.

Climate data for Turochak
Month	Jan	Feb	Mar	Apr	May	Jun	Jul	Aug	Sep	Oct	Nov	Dec	Year
Record high °C (°F)	7.6 (45.7)	11.8 (53.2)	21.1 (70.0)	31.2 (88.2)	35.2 (95.4)	37.0 (98.6)	38.6 (101.5)	38.4 (101.1)	35.0 (95.0)	26.0 (78.8)	17.0 (62.6)	9.9 (49.8)	38.6 (101.5)
Mean daily maximum °C (°F)	−10.6 (12.9)	−5.7 (21.7)	−2.7 (27.1)	10.4 (50.7)	18.6 (65.5)	23.6 (74.5)	25.9 (78.6)	23.2 (73.8)	17.3 (63.1)	8.5 (47.3)	−2.3 (27.9)	−9.6 (14.7)	8.1 (46.5)
Daily mean °C (°F)	−17.8 (0.0)	−14.7 (5.5)	−6.3 (20.7)	2.9 (37.2)	11.1 (52.0)	16.4 (61.5)	18.9 (66.0)	16.5 (61.7)	10.1 (50.2)	2.3 (36.1)	−8.0 (17.6)	−15.4 (4.3)	1.3 (34.4)
Mean daily minimum °C (°F)	−24.7 (−12.5)	−23.2 (−9.8)	−15.1 (4.8)	−4.4 (24.1)	3.1 (37.6)	8.8 (47.8)	11.9 (53.4)	9.8 (49.6)	3.7 (38.7)	−2.6 (27.3)	−13.5 (7.7)	−21.7 (−7.1)	−5.7 (21.8)
Record low °C (°F)	−50.0 (−58.0)	−47.8 (−54.0)	−41.1 (−42.0)	−37.2 (−35.0)	−8.9 (16.0)	−10.0 (14.0)	0.0 (32.0)	−1.1 (30.0)	−9.0 (15.8)	−25.0 (−13.0)	−46.1 (−51.0)	−47.8 (−54.0)	−50.0 (−58.0)
Average precipitation mm (inches)	35.5 (1.40)	24.9 (0.98)	33.0 (1.30)	51.9 (2.04)	74.2 (2.92)	87.5 (3.44)	108.1 (4.26)	110.7 (4.36)	74.7 (2.94)	63.0 (2.48)	56.4 (2.22)	58.0 (2.28)	777.9 (30.62)
Average precipitation days	9.8	8.9	8.7	9.7	10.3	10.2	10.4	10.1	9.0	9.7	10.0	10.9	117.7
Source: climatebase.ru
