= Biya (river) =

River in Russia

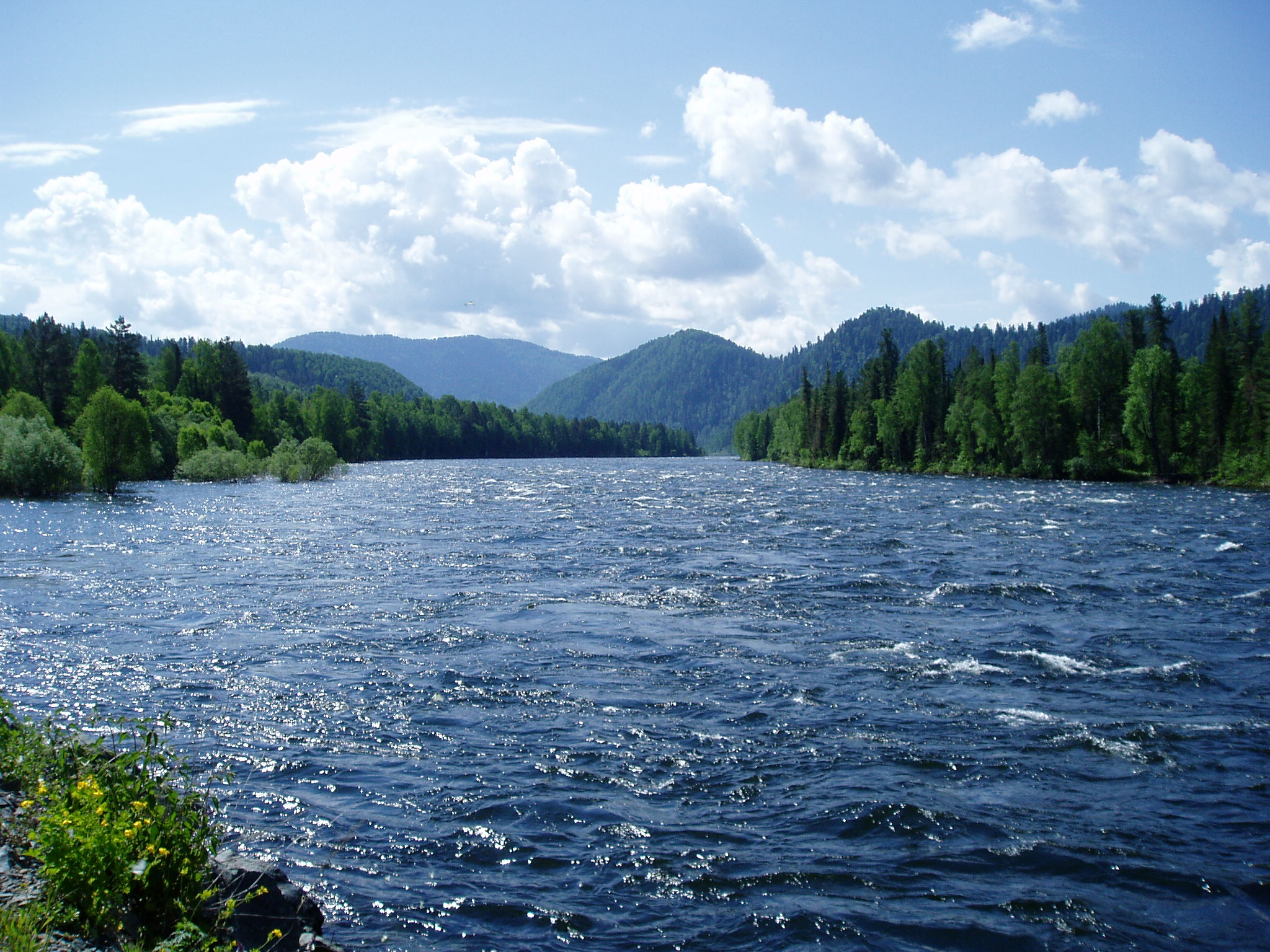

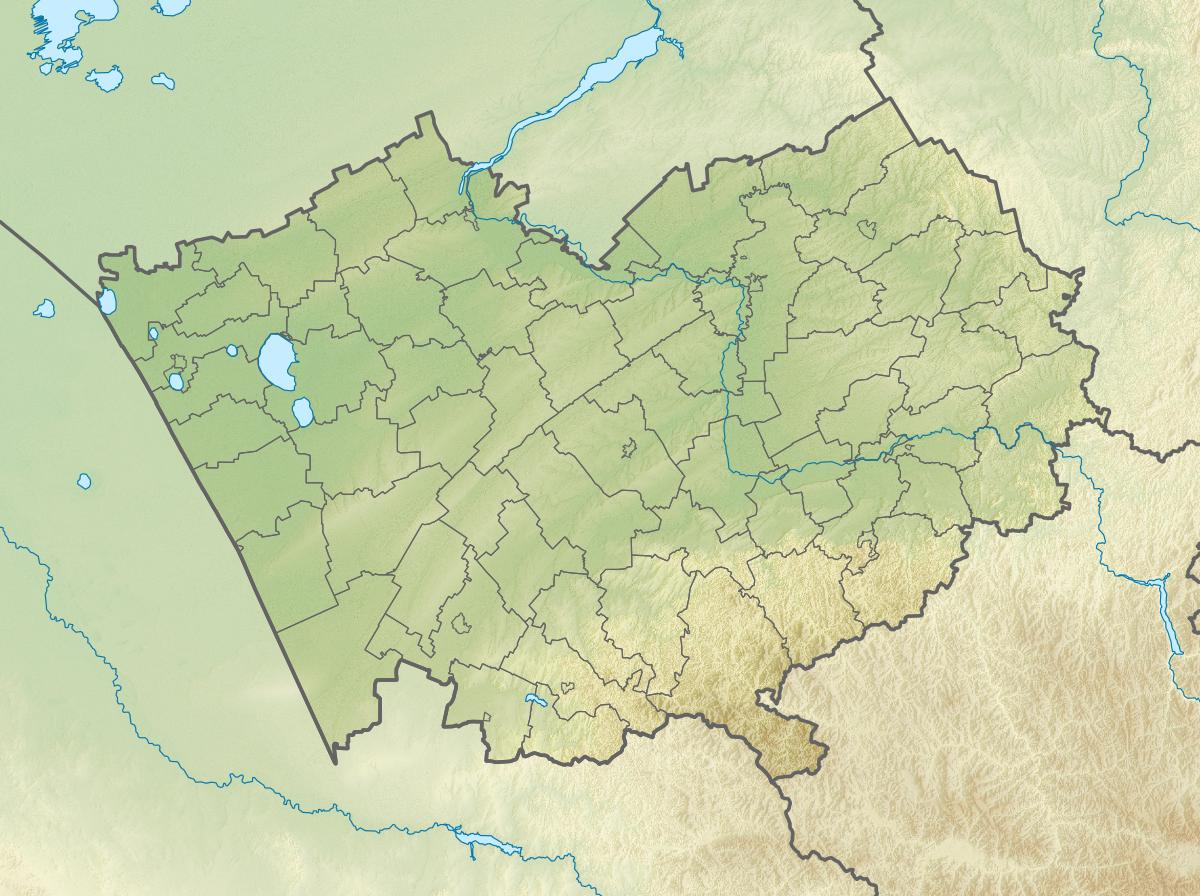
- Mouth location in Altai Krai, Russia

Location
- Country: Russia

Physical characteristics
- Source: Lake Teletskoye
  - coordinates: 51.786°N 87.246°E
- Mouth: Ob
  - coordinates: 52°25′54″N 85°01′26″E
- Length: 301 km (187 mi)
- Basin size: 37,000 km^{2} (14,000 sq mi)
- Discharge
  - location: Biysk
  - average: 477 m^{3}/s (16,800 cu ft/s)

Basin features
- Progression: Ob→ Kara Sea
- Tributaries
  - right: Lebed

The Biya (Russian: Би́я; Altay: Бий, Biy) is a river in the Altai Republic and Altai Krai in Russia. At its confluence with the Katun, downstream of the city Biysk, the Ob is formed. The Biya is 301 km long; the area of its drainage basin is 37,000 km^{2}. It flows out of the Lake Teletskoye. The river freezes up in mid-November to early December (some parts of the river freeze over on a year-to-year basis). It breaks up in early or mid-April. The Biya is navigable on its entire length.

The maximum depth of river is 28 feet (8.5 m).
