= Karakol (disambiguation) =

Karakol is a city in the Issyk-Kul region of Kyrgyzstan.

Karakol may also refer to:

- Karaköl, Jalal-Abad, Kyrgyzstan
- Karakol', a village Üch-Terek, Kyrgyzstan
- Karakol, Russia
- Karakol, Ust-Kansky District, Altai Republic, Russia
- Karakol, Ongudaysky District, Altai Republic, Russia
- Karakol, Atyrau Region, Kazakhstan
- Karakol (Chu basin), a lake in Moiynkum District, Kazakhstan
- Karakol (Shalkarteniz), a lake in Yrgyz District, Kazakhstan
- Karakol, Shalkar District, a lake in Aktobe Region, Kazakhstan
- Karakol culture, a Bronze Age culture in the modern-day Altai Republic
- Karakol Peak, a mountain in Issyk-Kul, Kyrgyzstan
- Karakol society, a Turkish political group
- Karakol (dance), a devotional street dance in the Philippines

== See also ==
- Qaragol (disambiguation)
- Caracol (disambiguation)
- Karakul (disambiguation)
