= Karakul =

Karakul, Kara-Kul, or Kara Kul (usually from transcriptions of names in Turkic languages meaning "Black Lake") may refer to:

== Wool ==
- Karakul sheep, an Uzbeki breed of domestic sheep
- Karakul fur, fur of karakul sheep
- Karakul hat, a style of cap made with the karakul fur, traditionally worn in Central and South Asia

== Places ==
- Karakul (Tajikistan), a lake in the Pamir Mountains
- Karakul (China), a lake in Xinjiang Province
- Qorako‘l or Karakul, a city in Bukhara Province, Uzbekistan
- Qorako‘l District or Karakul District, the surrounding region of Bukhara Province, Uzbekistan
- Karakul, Arkhangelsky District, Bashkortostan, Russia, a village
- Karakul, Karmaskalinsky District, Bashkortostan, Russia, a village
- Karakul, Khyber Pakhtunkhwa, village in Lower Chitral District, Pakistan
- Qarah Kul, a village in Iran
- Qaraqullar, a village in Azerbaijan
- Karakul deposit, major cobalt deposit in Altai Republic, Russia

== Other ==
- Karakul (song), a song in the album Crush by Floating Points

== See also ==
- Black Lake (disambiguation)
- Karakol (disambiguation)
- Qaragol (disambiguation)
- Karagöl (disambiguation)
- Karakulcha
