= Caracol (disambiguation) =

Caracol, or El Caracol, from the Spanish and Portuguese term for "spiral (snail–, conch– seashell–) shaped", may refer to:

== People ==
- Manolo Caracol, a Spanish flamenco singer
- Caracol, stage name of Quebec singer Carole Facal

== Places ==
- Caracol, an archaeological site and major centre of the pre-Columbian Maya civilization, located in present-day Belize
- Caracol, Nord-Est, a commune in Haiti
- Caracol, Añasco, Puerto Rico, a barrio

=== Brazil ===
- Caracol, Mato Grosso do Sul
- Caracol, Piauí
- Caracol Falls, in Brazil
- Caracol State Park, in Brazil, which contains the Caracol Falls

=== Mexico ===
- El Caracol, Chichen Itza, a notable structure/observatory at the Maya archaeological site of Chichen Itza, northern Yucatán, Mexico
- El Caracol, Ecatepec, a solar evaporation formation just outside Mexico City
- El Caracol, Michoacán, a village in the municipality of Hidalgo, Michoacán state, Mexico
- Caracol of Punta Sur, a Mayan site on Cozumel, Mexico

== Media ==
- Caracol Radio, a radio network in Colombia
- Caracol TV, a television network in Colombia
  - Caracol TV Internacional, an international television channel from Colombia

== See also ==
- Caracol River (disambiguation)
- Karakol (disambiguation)
- Caracole, a military manoeuvre
- Karakul (disambiguation)
