= Franzen House =

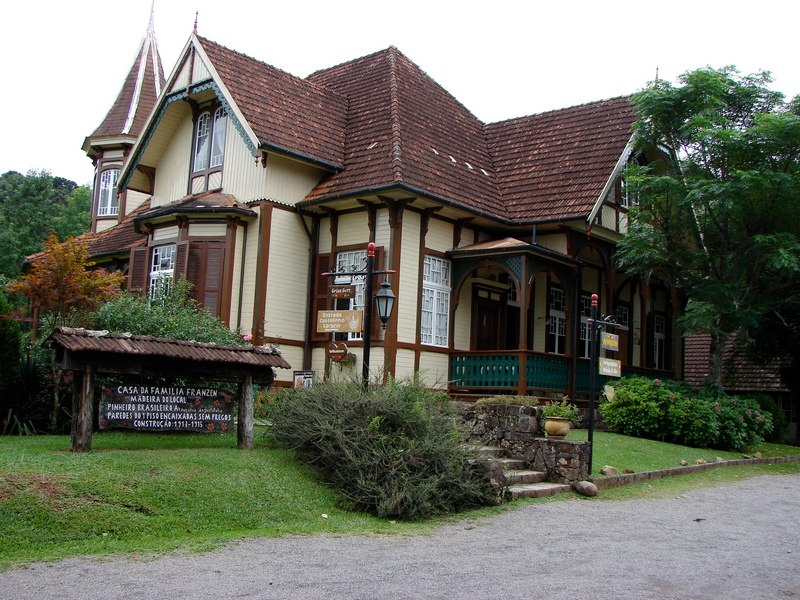
- The Franzen House in 2007
- Click on the map for a fullscreen view

General information
- Location: Canela, Brazil
- Coordinates: 29°20′07.97″S 50°51′00.66″W

The Franzen House is a historic house located in Canela, in the state of Rio Grande do Sul, in Brazil.

== History ==
The house was built between 1913 and 1915 by the German settler Pedro Carlos Franzen and his wife, Luiza Sommer. After being used as a family residence, the house was converted in 1985 into a museum and tea house, preserving original furniture, tools, and interiors that reflect the daily life of European settlers in Brazil in the first half of the 20th century.

== Description ==
The structure of the building is entirely made of araucaria wood, a pine native to the region, using a system of joints and screws, without the use of nails. The house consists of 18 rooms and is surrounded by a garden with auxiliary buildings such as an old sawmill and storage facilities.

== Gallery ==
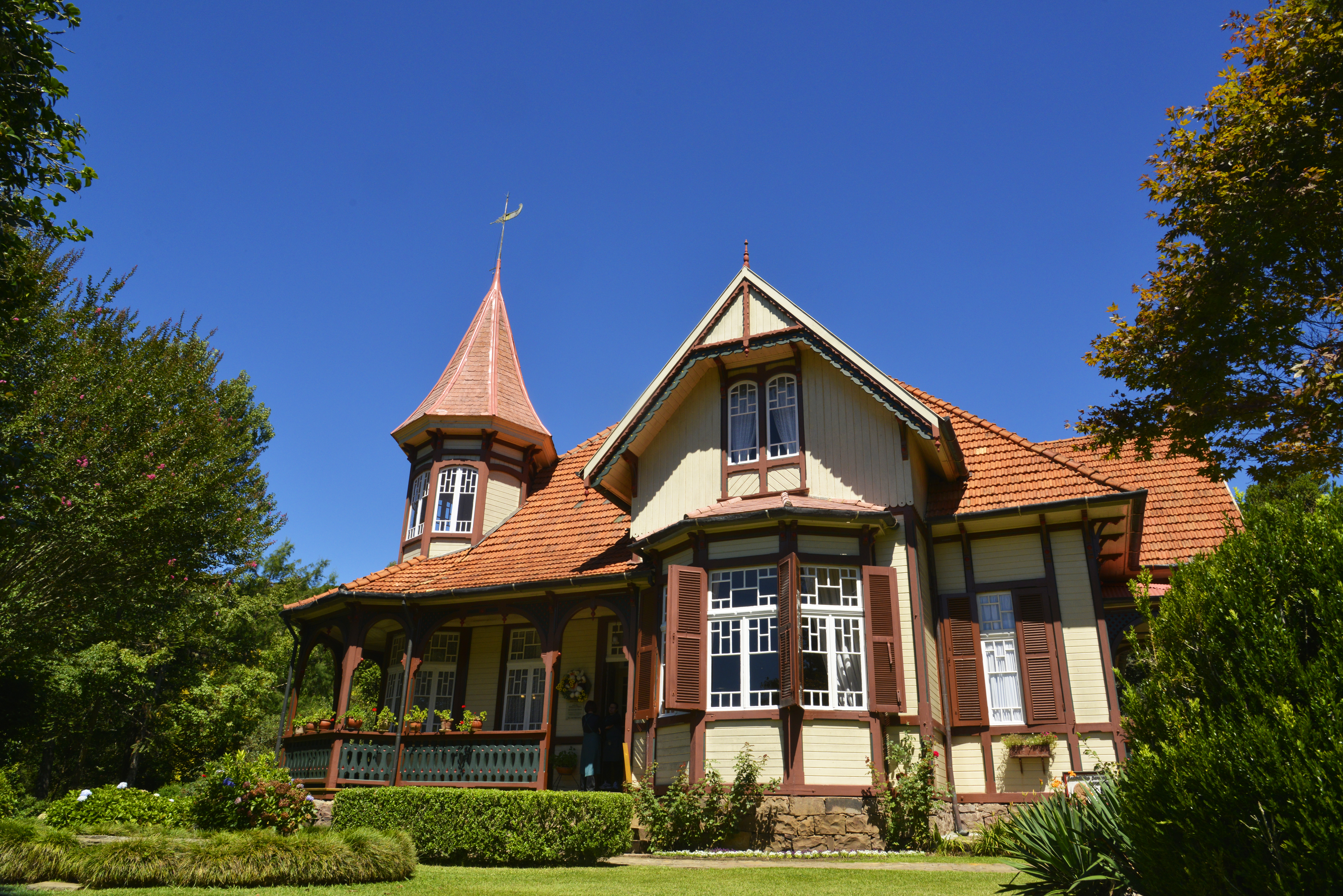

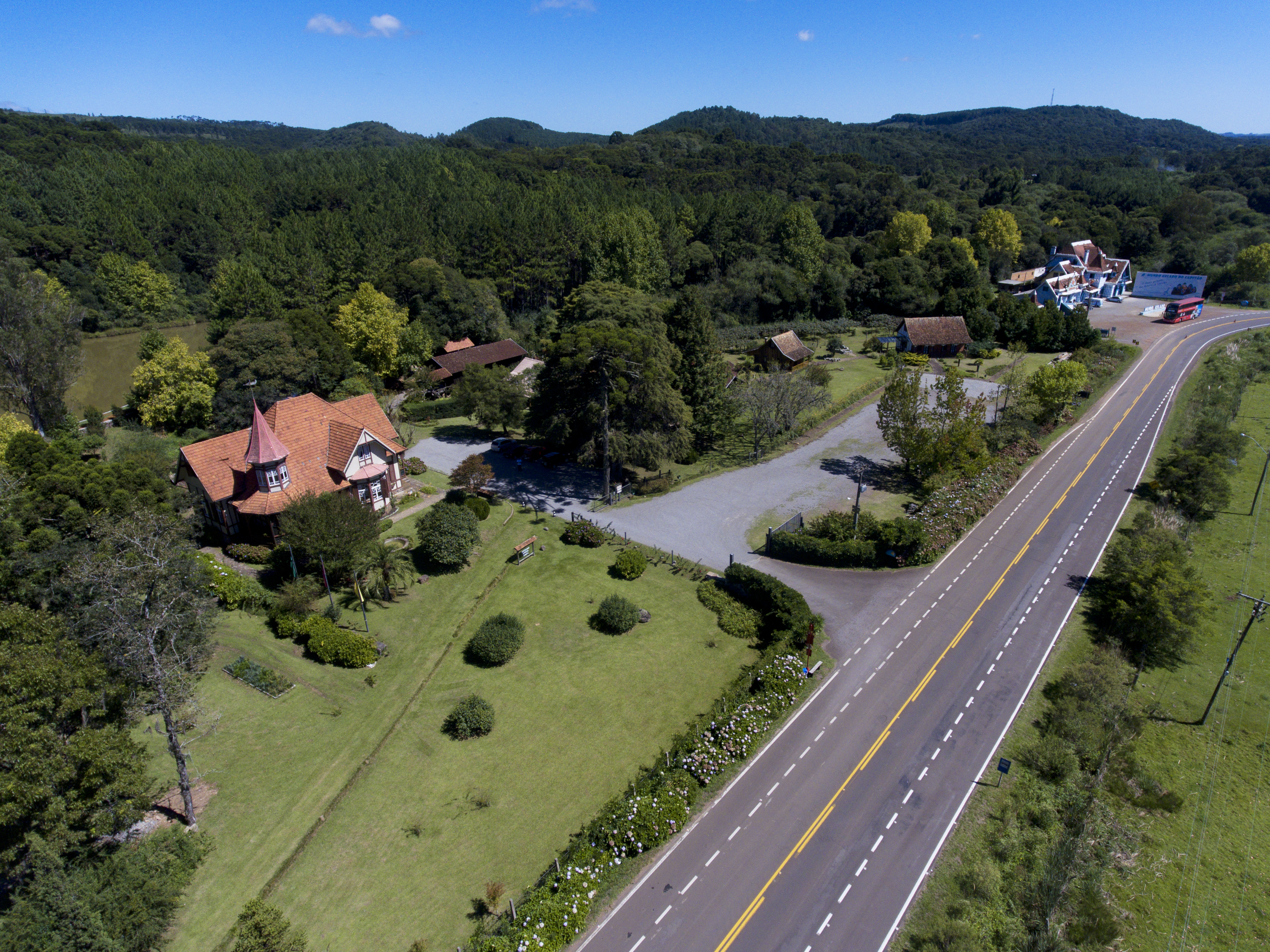

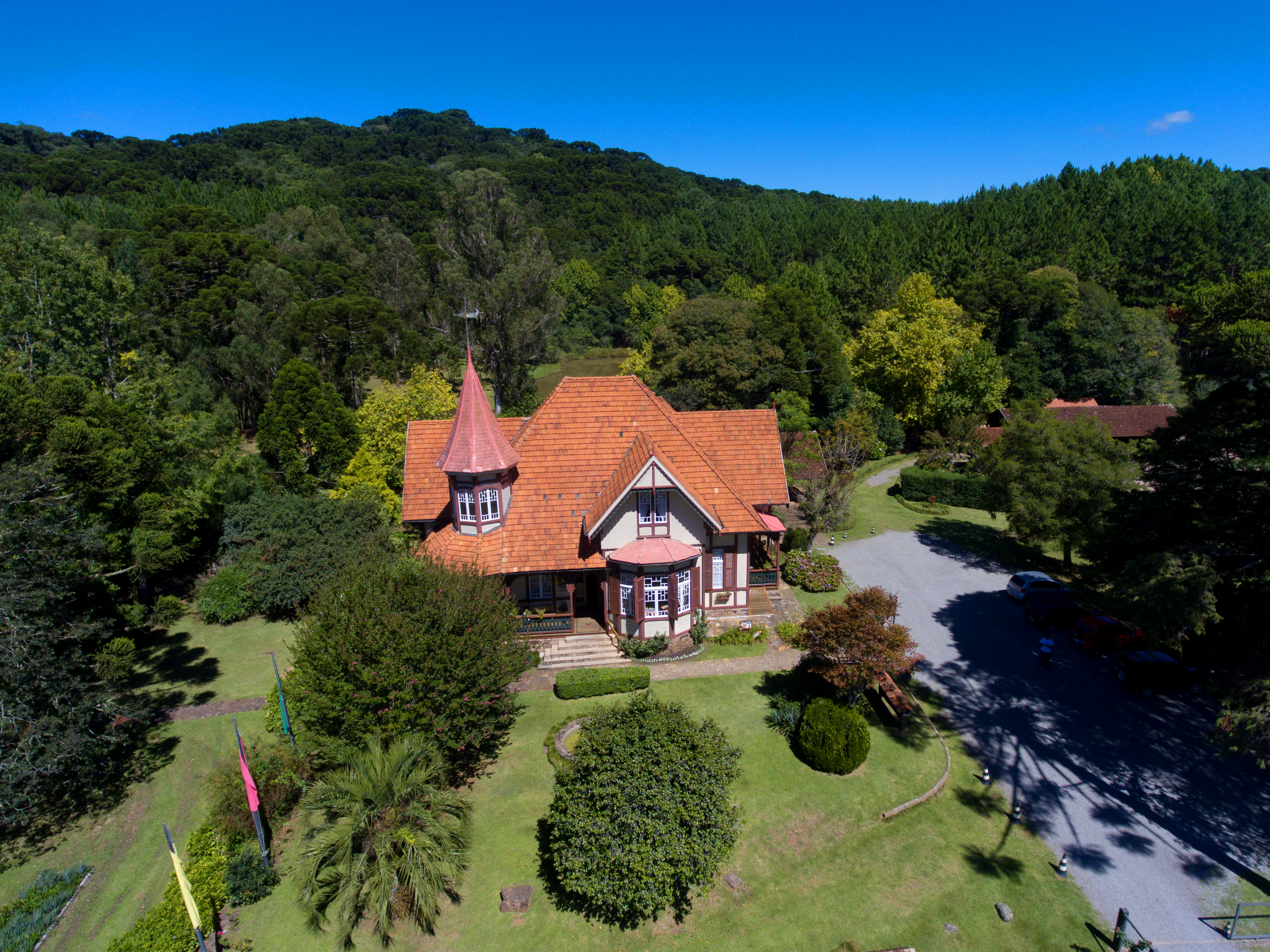
