= Caracol River =

There are several rivers named Caracol River or El Caracol River.

== Brazil ==
- Caracol River (Mato Grosso do Sul)
- Caracol River (Rio Grande do Sul)
- Caracol River (Paraná)
- Caracol River (Rondônia)
- Caracol River (Tocantins)

== Chile ==
- El Caracol River (Chile)

== Costa Rica ==
- El Caracol River (Costa Rica)

== Ecuador ==
- Caracol River (Ecuador)

== El Salvador ==
- Caracol River (El Salvador)

== Honduras ==
- El Caracol River (Honduras)

== Guatemala ==
- El Caracol River (Guatemala)

== Peru ==
- Caracol River (Peru)

== See also ==
- Caracol (disambiguation)
