= Caracole (disambiguation) =

Caracole or caracol is a turning maneuver on horseback in dressage and, previously, in military tactics.

Caracole or Caracoles may also refer to:

- Caracoles, a mining town in Antofagasta in the 19th century, in Bolivia at the time of its construction, now in Chile
- Karakoa, large outrigger warships from the Philippines, also called caracoa, caracole or caracolle during the Spanish period
- Caracole, a 1985 novel by Edmund White
- Bay Islanders, a creole ethnic group living in the Bay Islands Department of Honduras

== See also ==
- Caracol (disambiguation)
