= Qaragol =

Qaragol may refer to:

- Qaragöl, Azerbaijan
- Qaragol, Kurdistan, Iran
- Qaragol, Zanjan, Iran
- Qaragol, Sulaimani, Iraq
- Qaraghol, Iran
- Qarah Gol, Khodabandeh, Iran

== See also ==
- Karakol (disambiguation)
