= Church of Our Lady of Lourdes (Canela) =

Coordinates: 29°21′50″S 50°48′33″W

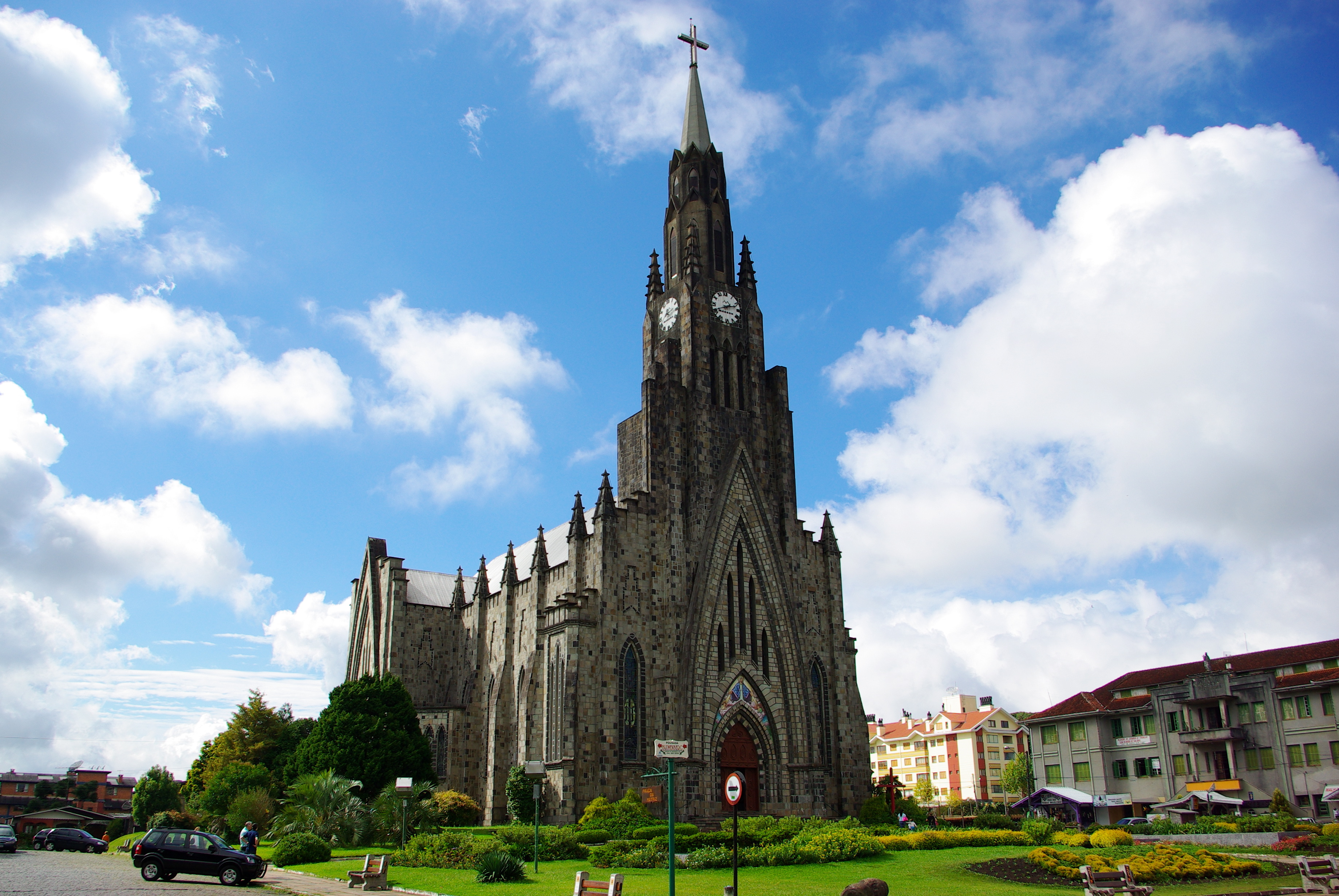
- Interactive map of the Church of Our Lady of Lourdes area

General information
- Location: Canela, Rio Grande do Sul, Brazil
- Construction started: 1953
- Completed: 1987

Height
- Antenna spire: 65 m (213 ft)

The Church of Our Lady of Lourdes (Portuguese: Igreja Matriz de Nossa Senhora de Lourdes), is a Catholic church located in the Brazilian city of Canela, Rio Grande do Sul. It is erroneously known as the Cathedral of Stone (Portuguese: Catedral de Pedra), although the church is not actually a cathedral. (Note: A cathedral, in the Roman Catholic Church, is a church where the seat of a diocese is located. The city of Canela is part of the Roman Catholic Diocese of Novo Hamburgo, whose seat is the Cathedral Basilica of St. Louis Gonzaga.) It is considered one of the major tourist attractions of the Serra Gaúcha.

Its characteristic style is English Gothic. The church has a tower with 65 meters high, and a carillon of 12 bells made of bronze by foundry Giacomo Crespi, Italy. In its interior are three panels consisting of painted canvases by the gaucho artist Marciano Schmitz, depicting the "Apparition of Our Lady", the "Allegory of the Angels", and "Annunciation". The paintings of Via Sacra were made by Pablo Herrera, a Uruguayan sculptor and restorer of Sacred Art. Wood and clay were used, with the background painting having superimposed images in clay.

Its stained glasses represent the litany of Our Lady. The altar, whose theme is the Last Supper, is a work of art carved in by wood Julius Tixe, a Uruguayan sculptor.
