= Karakol, Ust-Kansky District, Altai Republic =

Karakol Каракол
- Selo
- Location within Altai Republic Location within Russia
- Coordinates: 51°17′N 84°34′E
- Country: Russia
- Region: Altai Republic
- District: Ust-Kansky District
- Time zone: UTC+7:00

Karakol (Russian: Каракол; Altay: Кара-Коол, Kara-Kool) is a rural locality (a selo) in Ust-Kansky District, the Altai Republic, Russia. The population was 151 as of 2016. There are 3 streets.

== Geography ==
Karakol is located 77 km north of Ust-Kan (the district's administrative centre) by road. Chyorny Anuy is the nearest rural locality.
