= Karakol, Atyrau Region =

Karakol Қаракөл Караколь قاراكول
- Location within Kazakhstan
- Coordinates: 48°46′48″N 52°52′39″E
- Country: Kazakhstan
- Region: Atyrau
- Elevation: 8 m (26 ft)
- Time zone: UTC+5 (West Kazakhstan Time)
  - Summer (DST): UTC+5 (West Kazakhstan Time)

Karakol, also known as Karakol' and Qaraköl, (Kazakh: Қаракөл, Qaraköl, قاراكول; Russian: Караколь, Karakol') is a town in Atyrau Region, western Kazakhstan. It lies at an altitude of 8 m (26 ft).
