= Caracol State Park =

State park in Rio Grande do Sul, Brazil

- Parque Estadual do Caracol
- IUCN category II (national park)
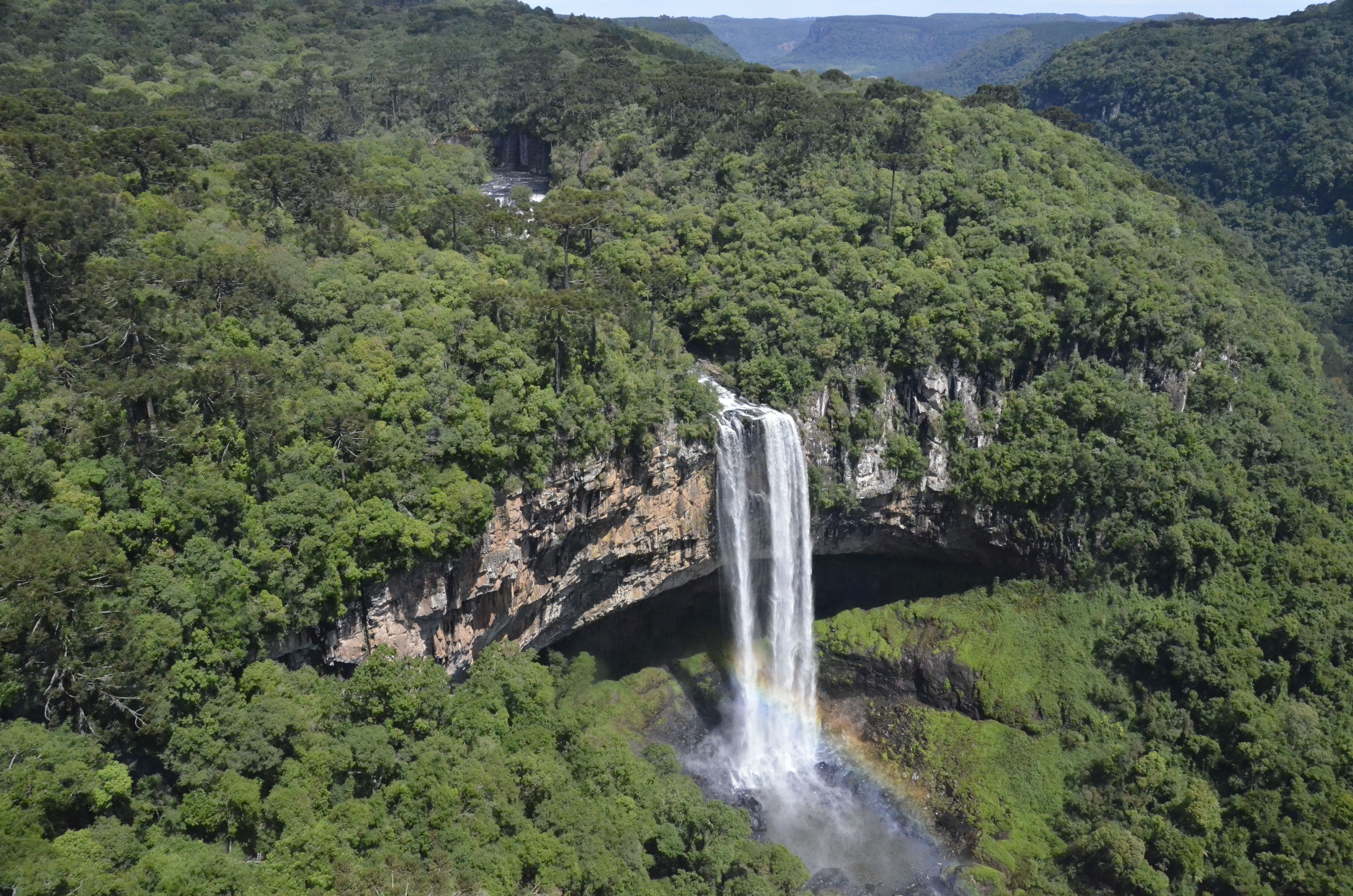
- Caracol Falls

- Location within Brazil
- Nearest city: Canela
- Coordinates: 29°18′40″S 50°51′16″W
- Area: 25 ha (62 acres)
- Designation: State park
- Created: 1973

The Caracol State Park (Portuguese: Parque Estadual do Caracol) is a small state park in the state of Rio Grande do Sul, Brazil. It contains the dramatic Caracol Falls, a major tourist attraction.

== Location ==
The Caracol State Park is in the municipality of Canela, Rio Grande do Sul. It has an area of 25 hectares (62 acres). It is 7 kilometres (4.3 mi) from the municipal seat. The park is in the Serra Gaúcha in the northeastern part of the state. The average elevation is 760 metres (2,490 ft). The Caracol Fall on the Arroio Caracol has a free fall of 131 metres (430 ft), and is the main tourist attraction.

== History ==
In prehistoric times the region of the park was occupied by Kaingang, collectors of fruit and seeds, and hunters. The first European explorers gave the region the name "Canela" from a caneleira (cinnamon) tree under which they made their camp. The Wassen family of Germany arrived in 1863 and began farming and raising livestock. The area has a pleasant climate and natural beauty of canyons, rivers and waterfalls. Hotels and vacation homes were built in the region, starting in 1900, before the town of Canela had been built.

Apart from vacationers, the economy depended on trade in cattle, pigs and their products, which were taken for sale to Porto Alegre and neighboring municipalities. A logging industry developed, exploiting the huge forest of araucaria pines, and accelerated when the railway arrived in 1924. A pulp mill was built beside a tributary of the Arroio Caracol, which crosses the park, affecting the water quality. This and the destruction of the forests drove the tourists away. Many species of animals were also driven out, including the maned wolf (Chrysocyon brachyurus), which was hunted in the false belief that it killed cattle.

The state government declared that the land covered by the park was of public utility in 1954. After legal expropriation the area was transferred in 1968 to the State Tourist Office of Canela. The Caracol State Park was established in 1973 with an area of 100 hectares (250 acres), of which 25 hectares (62 acres) is state-owned.

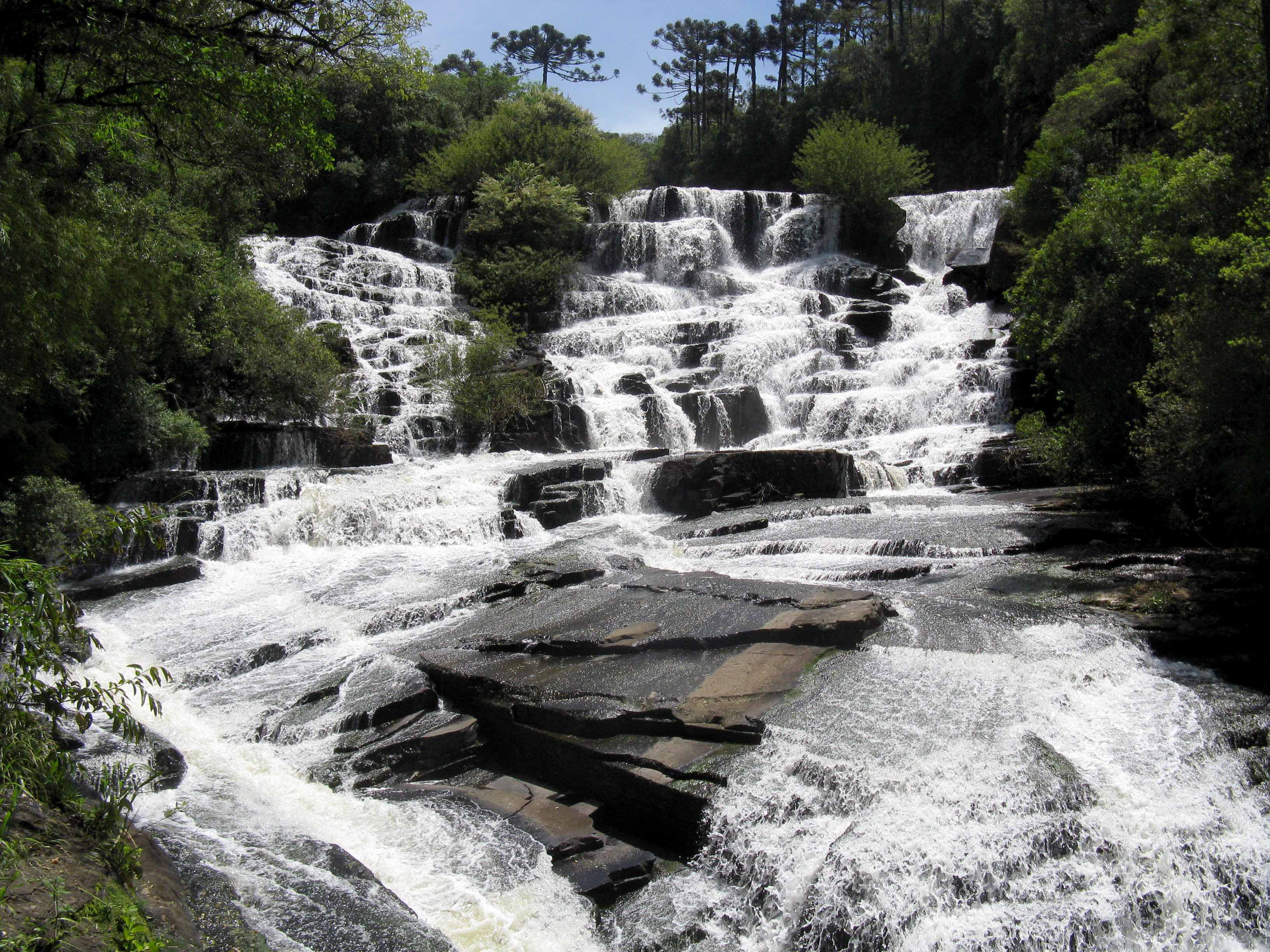
A waterfall at the Park.

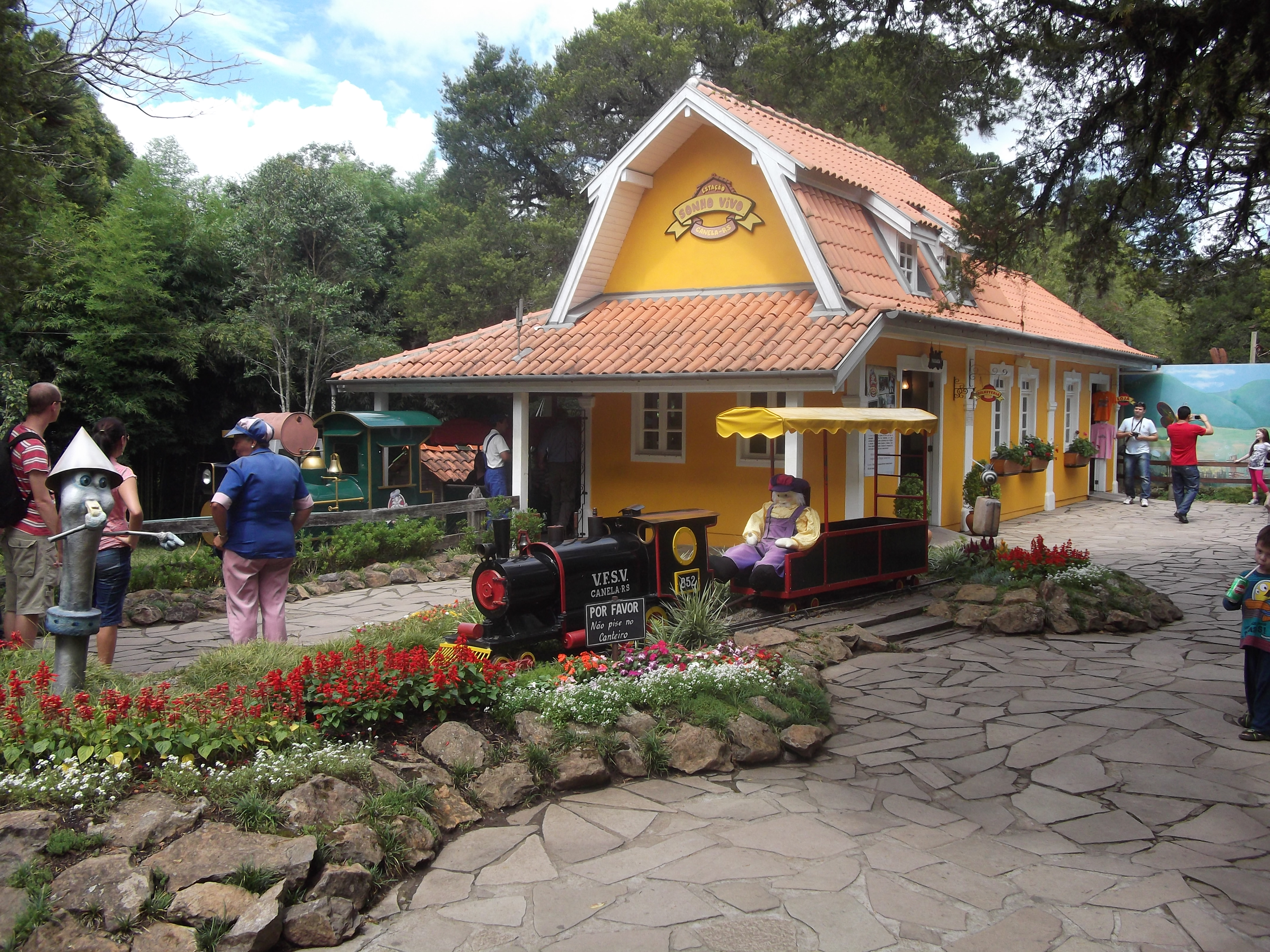
Sonho Vivo Station.

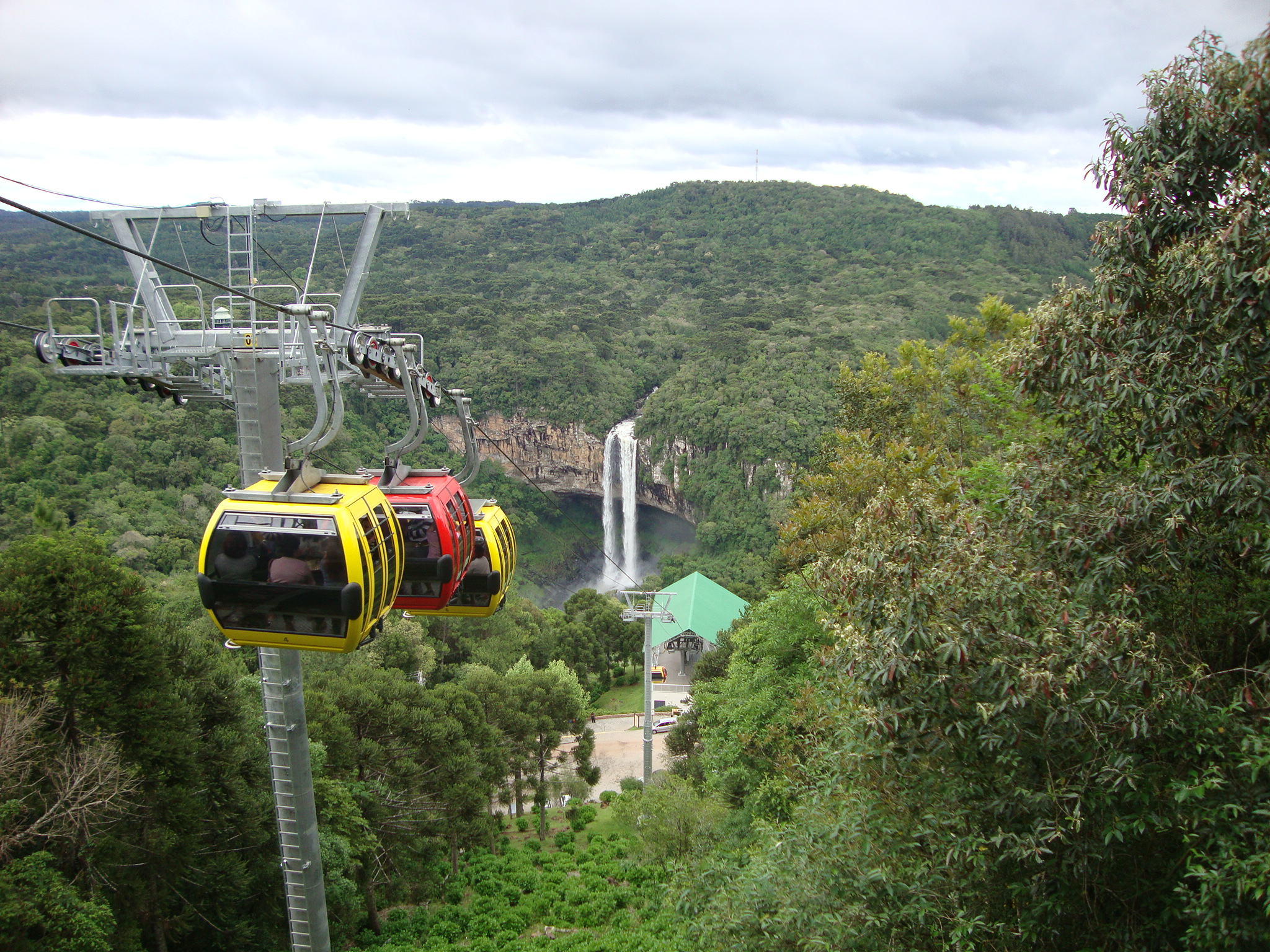
Aerial tramway at the Caracol State Park.

== Environment ==
The climate is temperate, with rain distributed throughout the year. The average temperature is 22 °C (72 °F) in the summer and 10.5 °C (50.9 °F) in winter, occasionally falling to as low as −8 °C (18 °F). Snow falls in July and August. Above the escarpment of the Caracol Falls the vegetation is montane rainforest and araucaria forest. Below the escarpment the vegetation is submontane seasonal deciduous forest. The park also contains savanna grasslands.

The araucaria forest was devastated by logging from the 1920s to 1950s, but some specimens with trunks up to 1.5 metres (4 ft 11 in) in diameter are still found near the edge of the escarpment. The vegetation is now regenerating, and Araucária angustifolia is forming an emergent stratum above a canopy of trees such as Pinho-bravo, Bugre and Capororoca. The large numbers of visitors create some environmental problems, including destruction of seedlings, litter, and so on. However, generally the environment is recovering and wild animals are returning to their habitats. Areas are set aside for visitors to use for picnics and leisure, and other areas are set aside as refuges. Thousands of tree seedlings have been planted to speed up recovery.

The region was recommended for permanent preservation as a refuge for deer, and mainly preás. 30 species of mammals have been recorded, including veado mateiro, bugio-ruivo, gato-do-mato-pequeno, coati, otter and preá. 130 species of bird have been recorded.

== Tourism ==
The park receives about 2,500,000 visitors annually. It is the most popular tourist destination in the southern region of Brazil after the Iguaçu National Park. As of 2014 there was an admission fee of R$12 per person. The park provides barbecue grills for visitors in an area with tables and benches, many covered, with nearby toilets. There is a large grassy area for sports. Beside the park entrance there are craft shops, a restaurant and toilets.

A cable car provides a panoramic view of the falls. The cable cars have closed cabins and come from Switzerland. They are operated by a private company, and there is a fee for the ride. There are two belvederes from which the waterfall can be viewed, one with free admission, the other slightly higher and with an entrance fee. The 27 metres (89 ft) glassed-in platform is reached by an elevator. The Ecological Observatory gives one of the best views. There is a stairway with 927 steps leading to the base of the waterfall.

The Loboguará Project, established in 1991, is based in the park and supports low impact ecological tourism and environmental education. The Loboguará Project gives courses on the park's environment, observation, interpretation and practical ecology actions. There are four interpretive trails, a center of environmental education in an old house built of araucaria pine wood by the Wassen family, and an amphitheatre. As of 2014 the environmental center seemed to have been abandoned. The trails are unsuitable for people in poor physical condition, who may instead pay to take the small train ride from the Sonho Vivo Station.

== Sources ==
- Blanco, Enrique (2017), Turismo ecológico educativo no Parque Estadual do Caracol: o Projeto Loboguará (in Portuguese), Instituto Virtual de Turismo do Estado do Rio de Janeiro - IVT-RJ, archived from the original on 2017-01-13
- "Canela: os Bondinhos do Parques da Serra e o Parque do Caracol", meusroteirosdeviagem (in Portuguese)
- "Parque do Caracol", Canela Turismo (in Portuguese), archived from the original on 2017-01-11
- Parque do Caracol (in Portuguese), Férias Brasil
- "Parque do Caracol", Gramado Canela (in Portuguese)
- Waitmann, Gabriel (July 2014), A Natureza na Serra Gaúcha: Parque do Caracol e Parque da Ferradura (in Portuguese), Guardanapo de Papel
