= Canela, Rio Grande do Sul =

Municipality in Rio Grande do Sul, Brazil

Canela
- Municipality
- Municipality of Canela
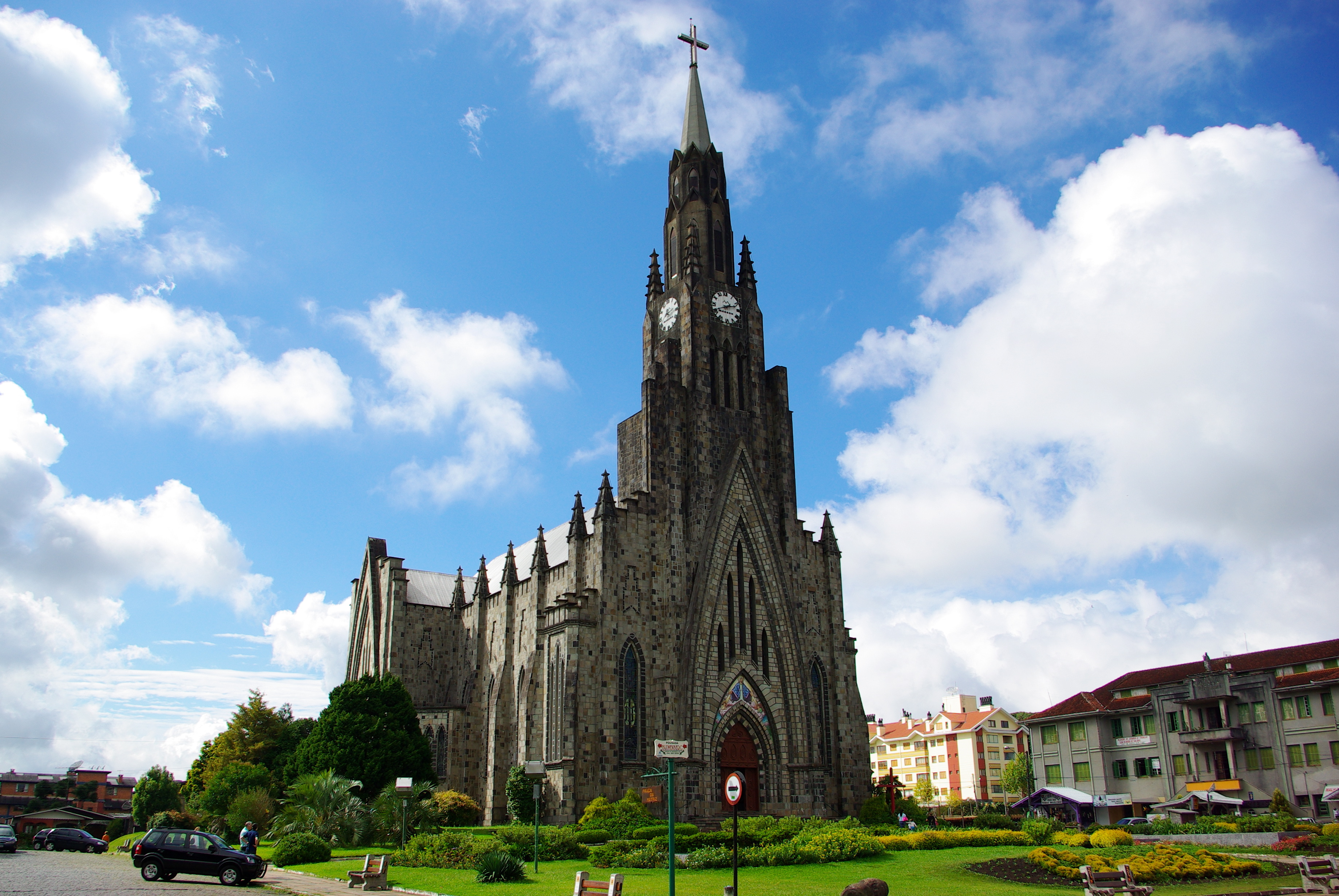
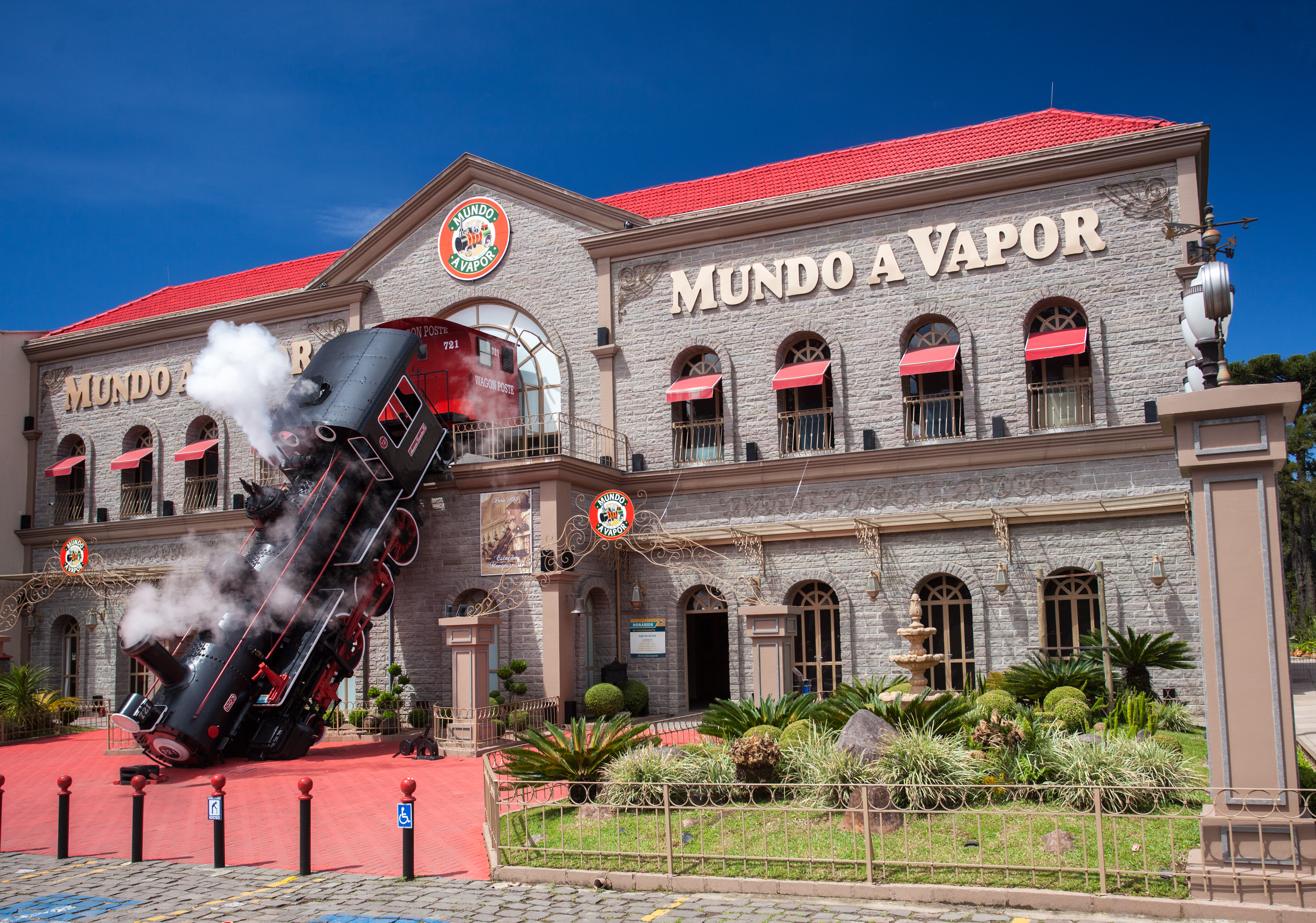
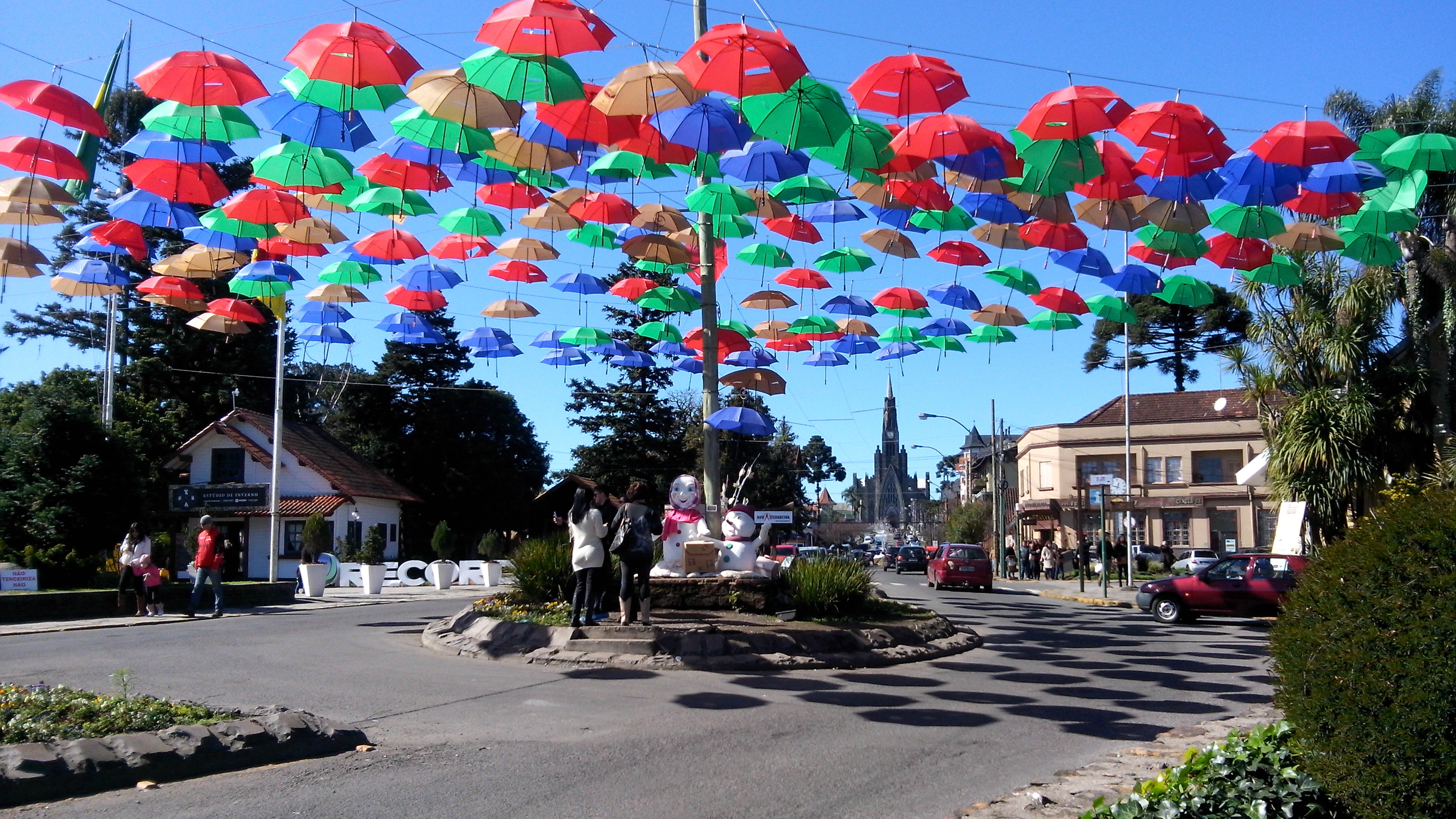
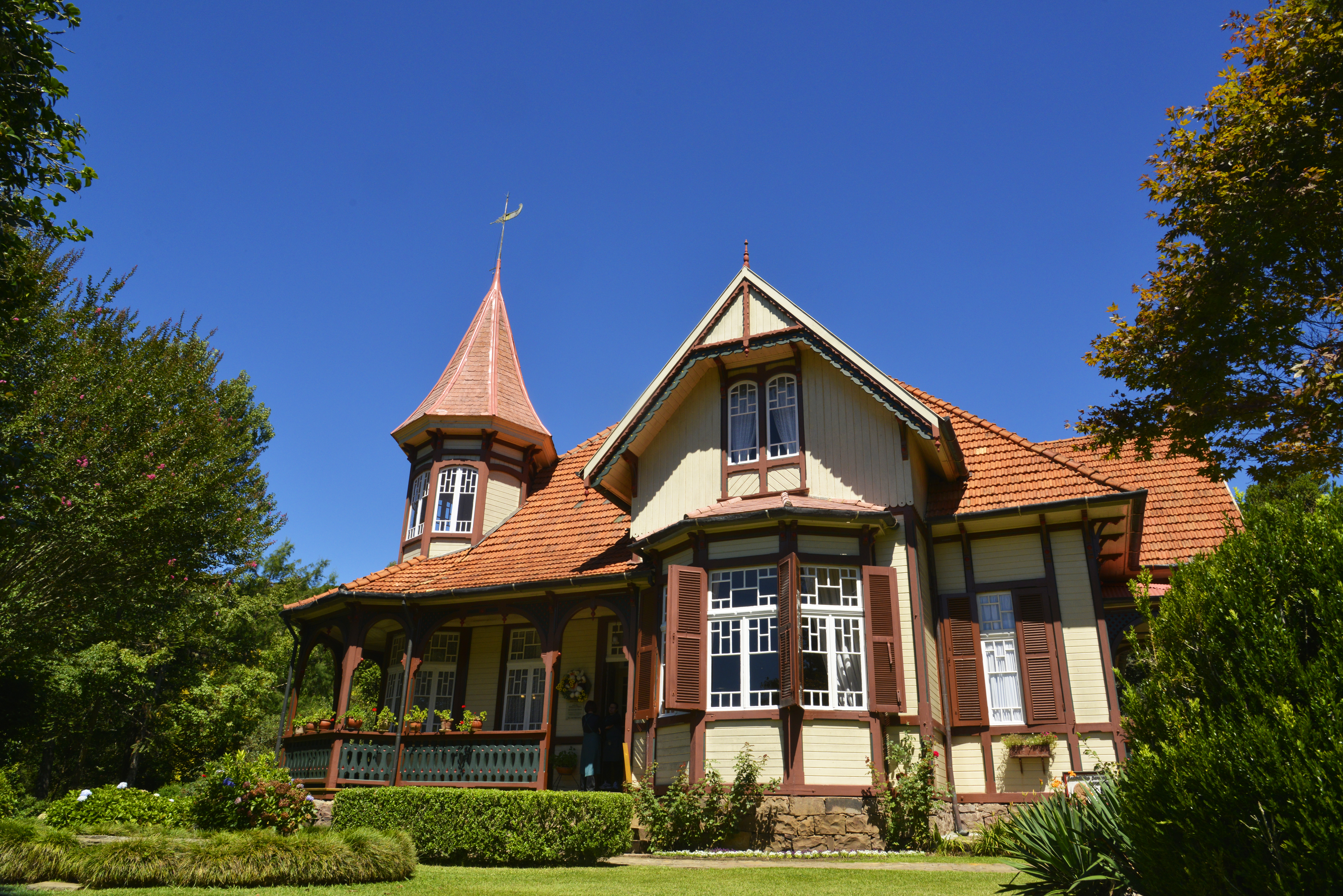
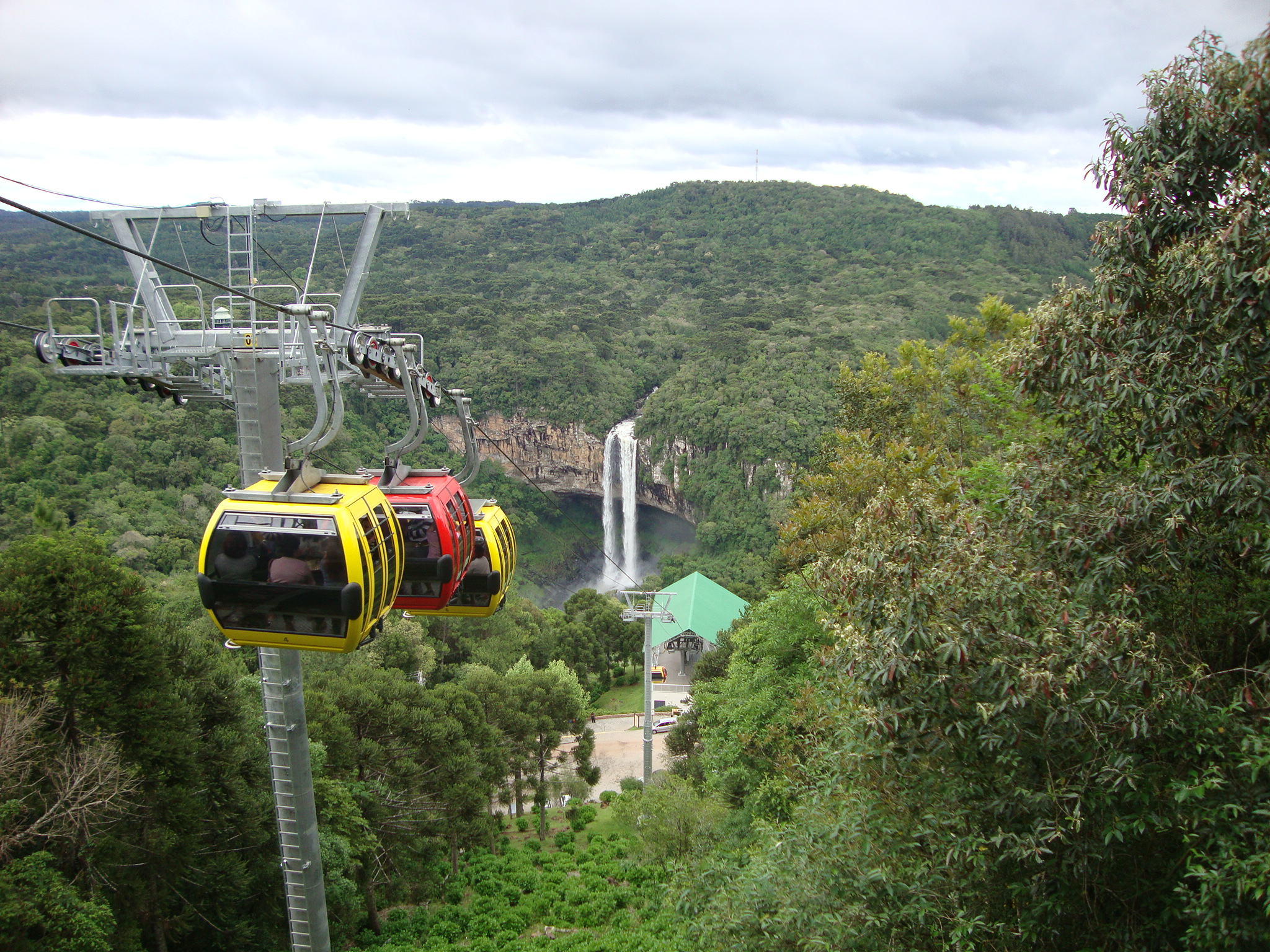
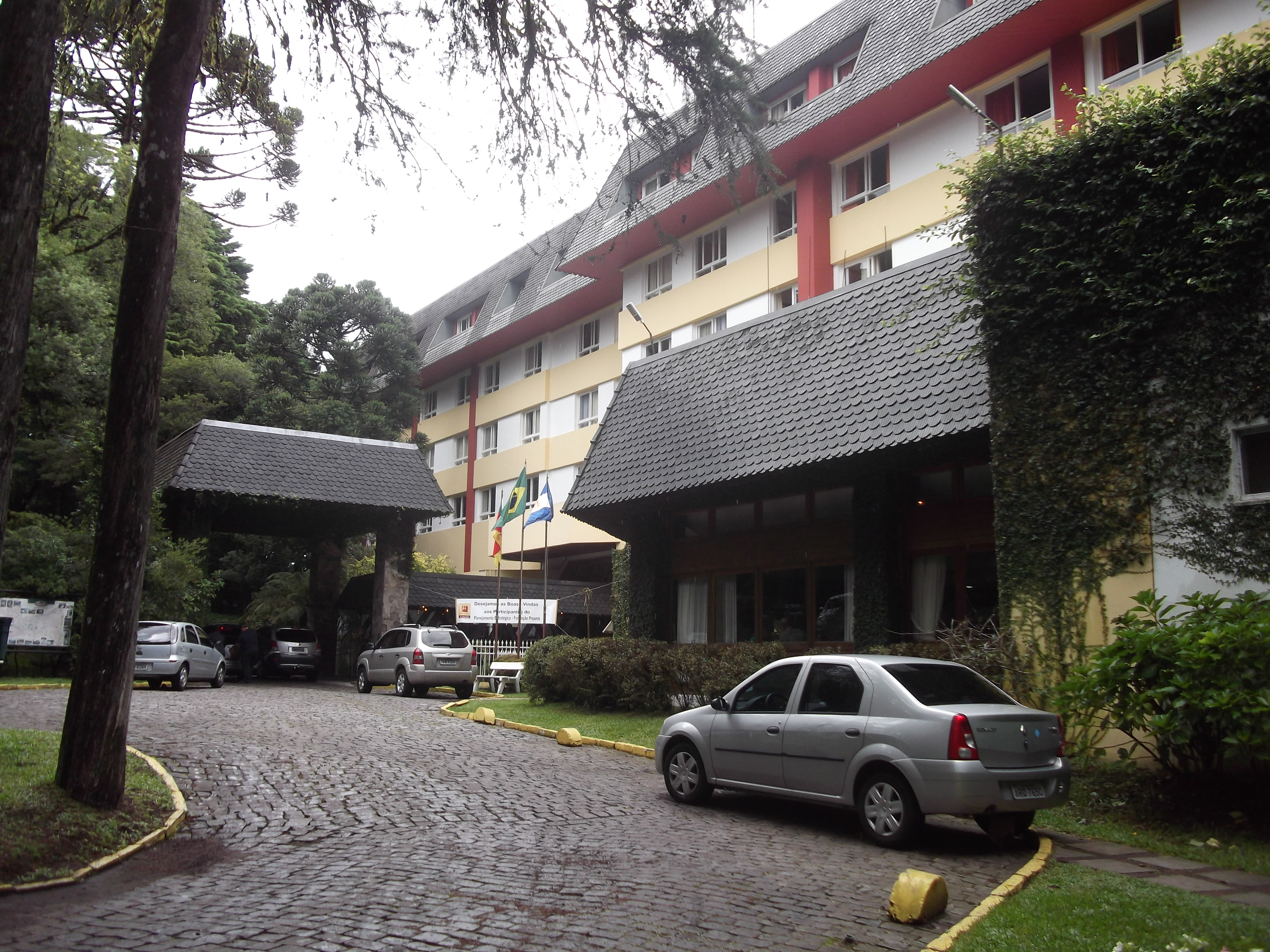
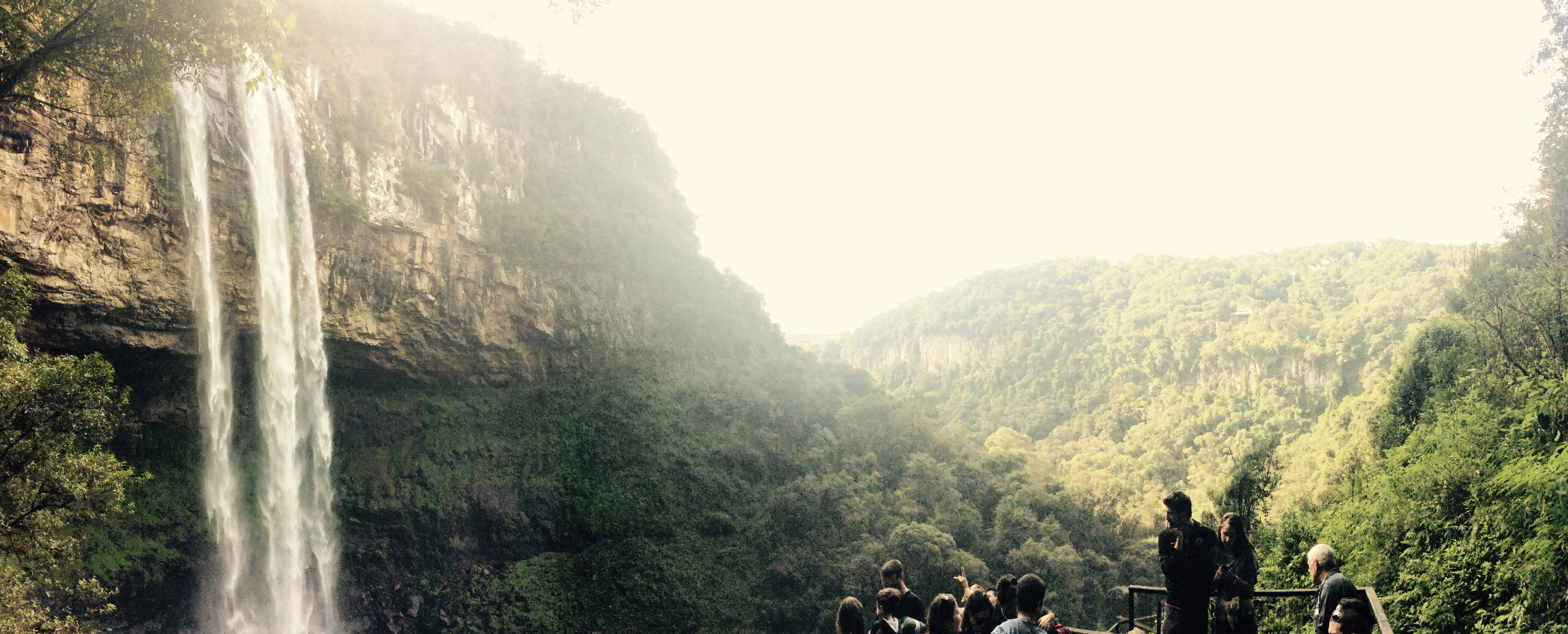

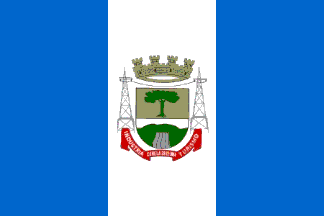
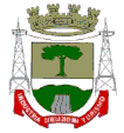
- Flag Coat of arms

- Location in the state of Rio Grande do Sul and Brazil
- Coordinates: 29°21′42″S 50°48′56″W
- Country: Brazil
- Region: South
- State: Rio Grande do Sul
- Founded: December 28, 1944

Government
  - Mayor: Constantino Orsolin

Area
  - Total: 254.579 km^{2} (98.294 sq mi)
- Elevation: 837 m (2,746 ft)

Population (2020)
  - Total: 45,488
  - Density: 157.7/km^{2} (408/sq mi)
- Time zone: UTC−3 (BRT)
- HDI (2010): 0.748 – high
- Website: www.canela.rs.gov.br

Canela (Portuguese pronunciation: [kɐˈnɛlɐ]), meaning Cinnamon in Portuguese, is a town located in the Serra Gaúcha of Rio Grande do Sul, Brazil. Both Canela and neighboring Gramado are important tourist locations and they both draw many visitors each year. Ecotourism is very popular in the area and there are many opportunities for hiking, rock climbing, horseback riding and river rafting.

One of the most important tourist destinations in Rio Grande do Sul, the city of Canela had its first urban center formed in 1903, when Colonel João Ferreira Corrêa da Silva settled there. On December 28, 1944, State Law No. 717 created the municipality, which was officially established four days later on January 1, 1945.

It is located at a latitude of 29º21'56" south and a longitude of 50º48'56" west, at an altitude of 837 meters. Its estimated population in 2018 was 44,489 inhabitants, according to the Brazilian Institute of Geography and Statistics. It has an area of 252.91 km², representing 0.0947 percent of the territory of Rio Grande do Sul.

== Tourism ==
The main tourist attraction in Canela is the Parque do Caracol, the Cathedral of Stone, and Caracol Falls (Cascata do Caracol). Like sister town Gramado, Canela is a large tourist draw during the winter, where snowfall can occur, and during the Christmas holiday and the local town council deck Canela with lights and other festive decorations.

Canela is part of the Rota Romântica or Romantic Route, a scenic bypass.

An imitation of the Montparnasse derailment has been built outside the Mundo a Vapor ("Steam World") museum theme park in the city.

== Gallery ==
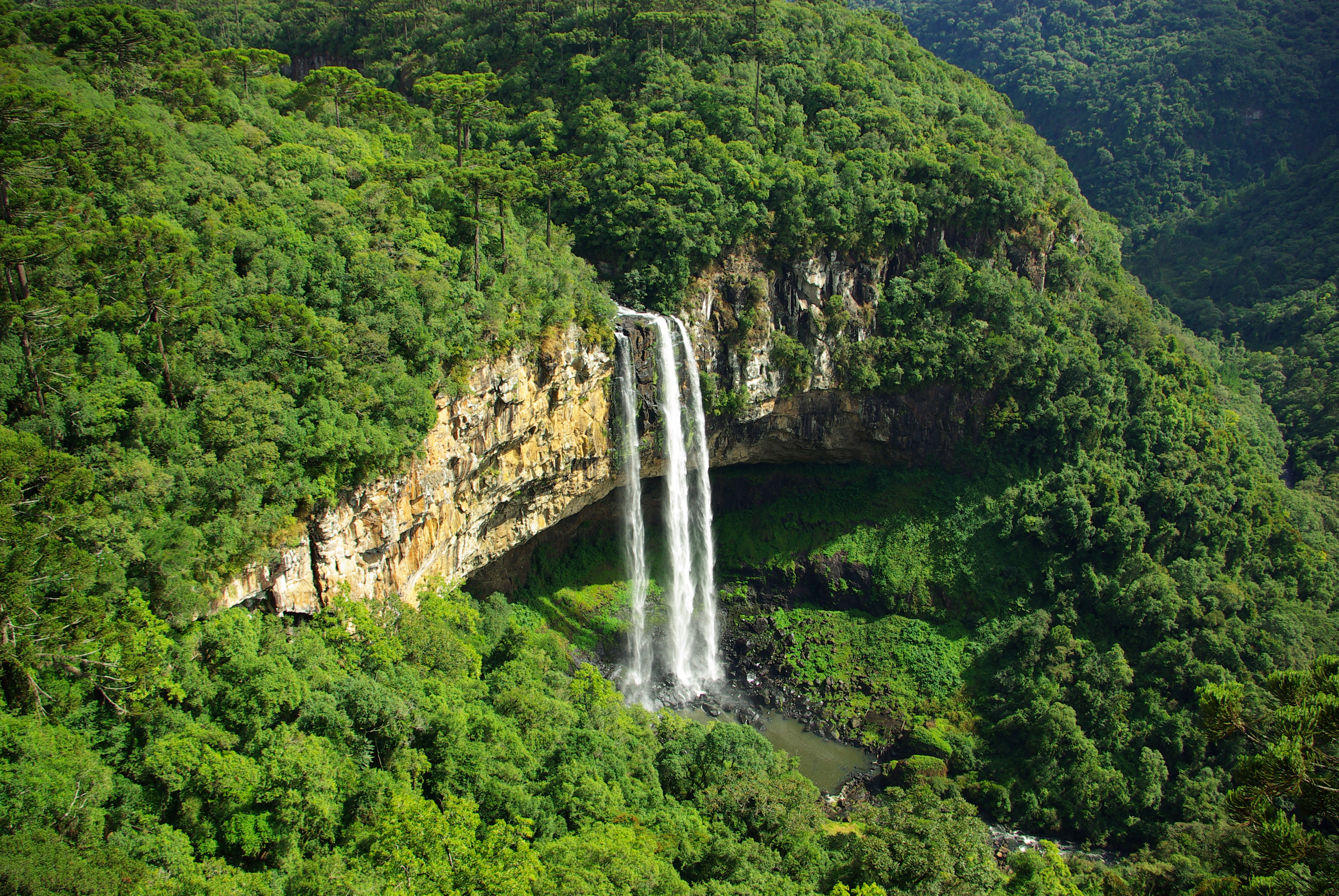
Caracol falls

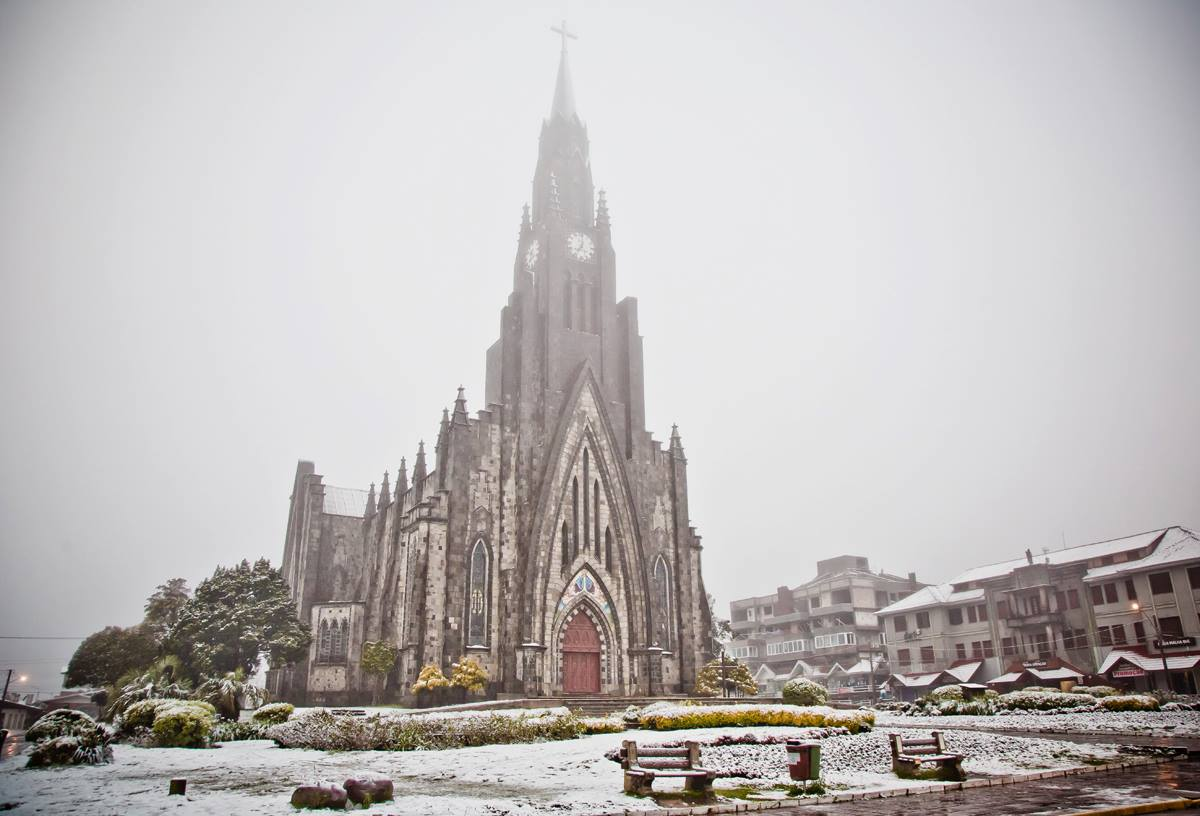
Winter in Canela

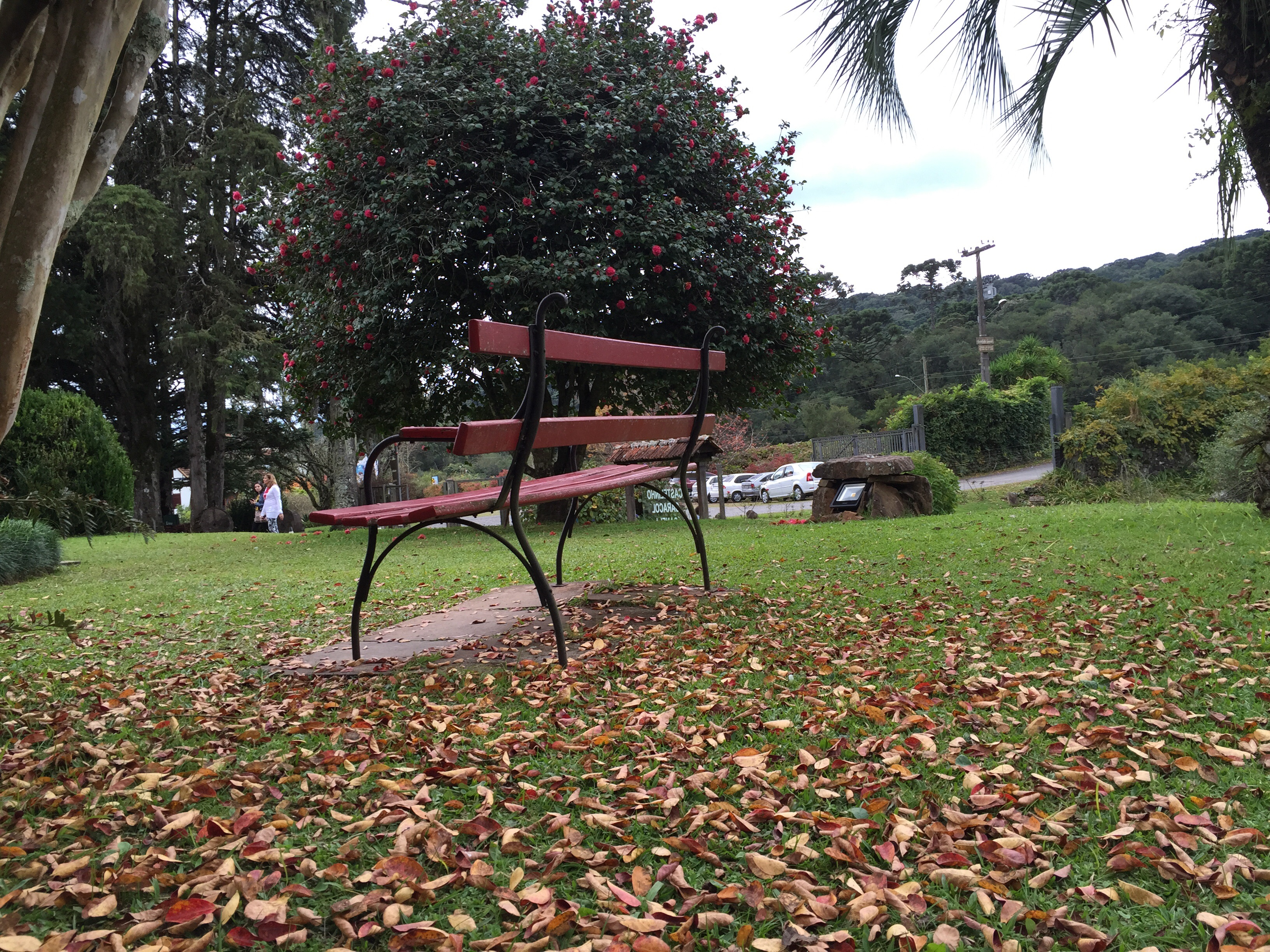
Autumn in Canela

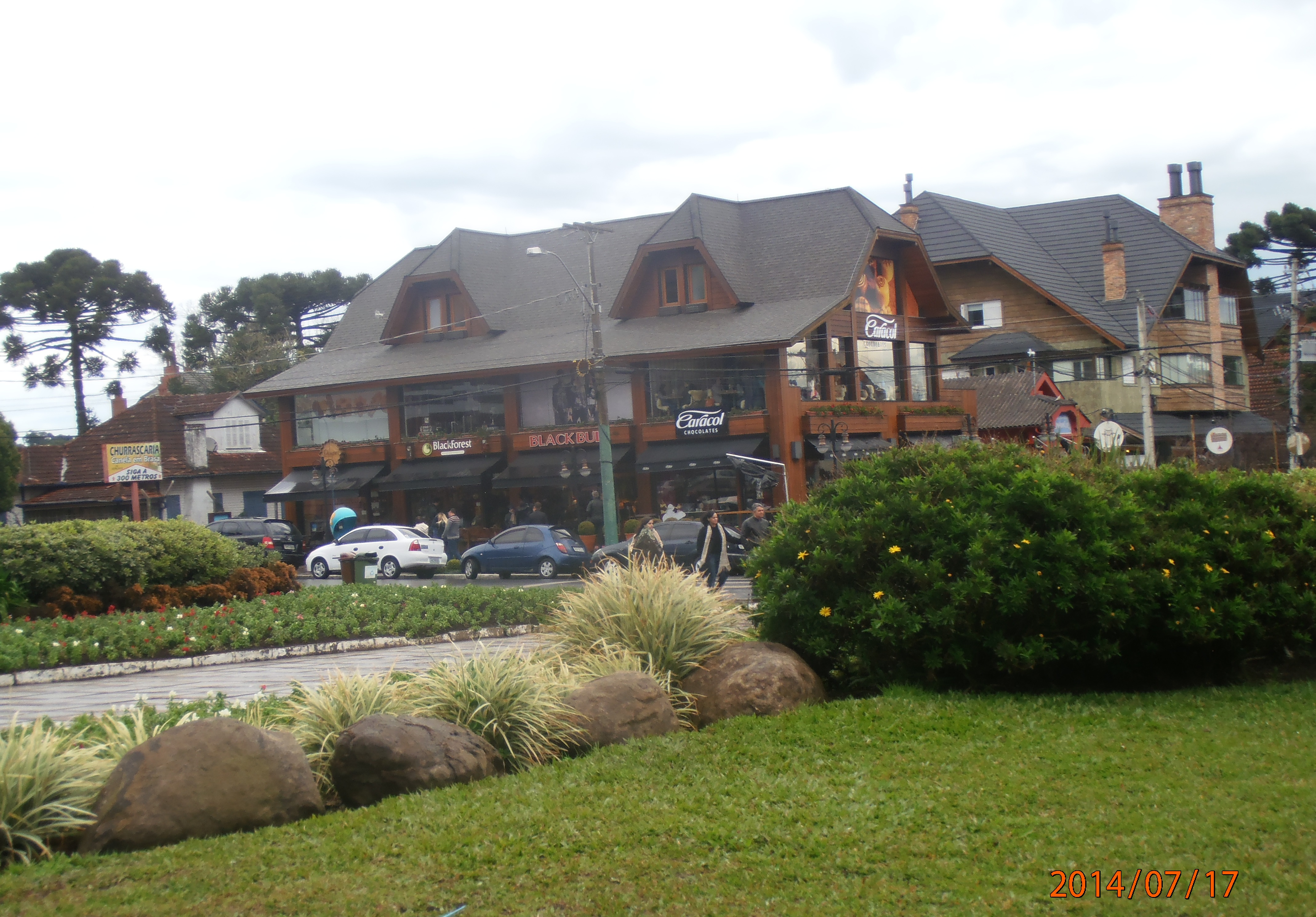
Downtown

== Transportation ==
Canela is served by Canela Airport.

== See also ==
- List of municipalities in Rio Grande do Sul
- Canela Preta Biological Reserve
- Snow in Brazil
