= Qaraghol =

Qaraghol قراغل
- Village
- Location within Iran
- Coordinates: 35°24′57″N 47°51′33″E
- Country: Iran
- Province: Kurdistan
- County: Qorveh
- Bakhsh: Serishabad
- Rural District: Qaslan

Population (2006)
  - Total: 262
- Time zone: UTC+3:30 (IRST)
  - Summer (DST): UTC+4:30 (IRDT)

Qaraghol (Persian: قراغل, also Romanized as Qarāghol and Qarāghel; also known as Arāghol and Khār-i-Gul) is a village in Qaslan Rural District, Serishabad District, Qorveh County, Kurdistan Province, Iran. At the 2006 census, its population was 262, in 62 families. The village is populated by Kurds.
