= Karakol (dance) =

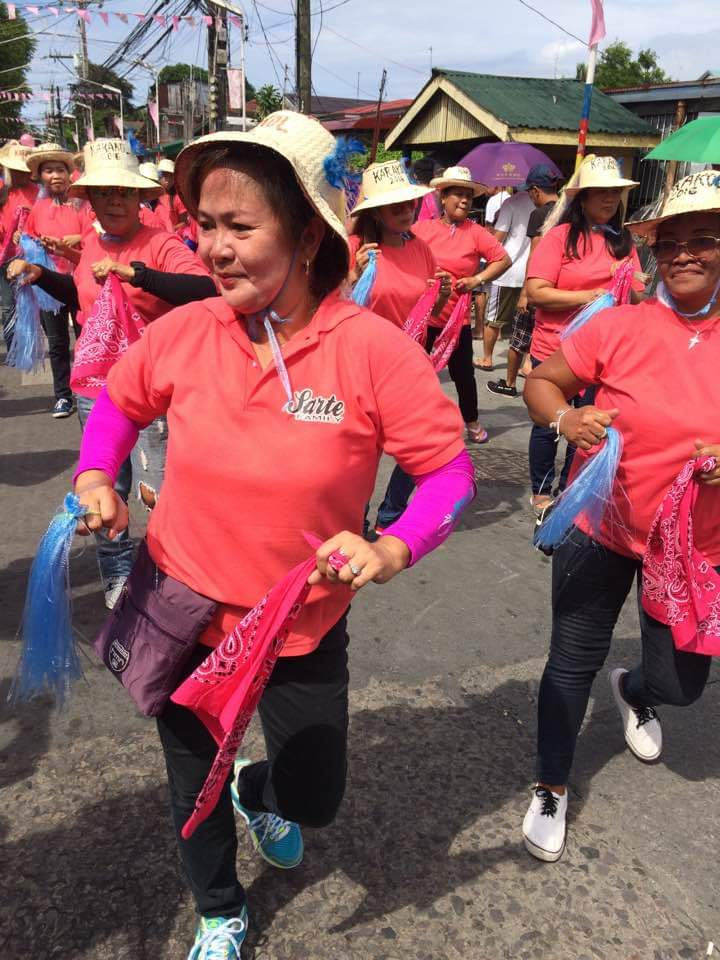
- Women doing the Karakol dance in Imus, Cavite
- Observed by: Filipino Catholics
- Type: Christianity

Karakol (Tagalog pronunciation: [ka.raˈkol]) is a devotional street dance and slow-moving procession performed in the Philippines in honor of patron saints, particularly during fiestas. The term is derived from the Spanish word caracol (snail), referring to the procession's slow pace.

== History ==
Karakol evolved from the Spanish caracol (meaning snail) and caracoa (early Filipino war boats). It was originally a river-based prayer for bountiful fishing. Over time, it transformed into a lively, hopping street dance. Devotees perform this dance to thank a patron saint or to ask for a special blessing. People dance along the streets in time with a waltz or marching band rhythm.

== Regional celebrations ==
In Bohol, Karakol is one of the highlights during the Matabao festival. It is performed as a panata (vow), either as a prayer for blessings and daily needs or as thanksgiving for favors received.

In Cavite, Karakol is considered as a traditional festive dance. In 2023, during the 125th celebration of Philippine Independence, Caviteños in UK modified Karakol to involve waving of the Philippine flags

In Camarines Norte, devotees join the annual Karakol Festival, a fluvial procession honoring San Antonio de Padua, patron saint of Mercedes. Barangays parade their images on decorated floats and fishing vessels carrying both icons and devotees.
