= Karagöl =

Karagöl (literally 'black lake' in Turkish) may refer to the following entities in Turkey:

- Karagöl (Giresun), a region, mountain and lake in north-central Turkey
- Karagöl (Toros), a lake in south-central Turkey
- Karagöl (Izmir), a national park and lake in western Turkiye
- Karagöl-Sahara, a national park in Artvin Province, north-eastern Turkey
- Karagöl, Dargeçit, a village in Mardin Province, south-eastern Turkey
- MV Karagöl, an oil/chemical tanker owned and operated by a Turkish company
