= Caracol River (Rio Grande do Sul) =

River in Rio Grande do Sul, Brazil

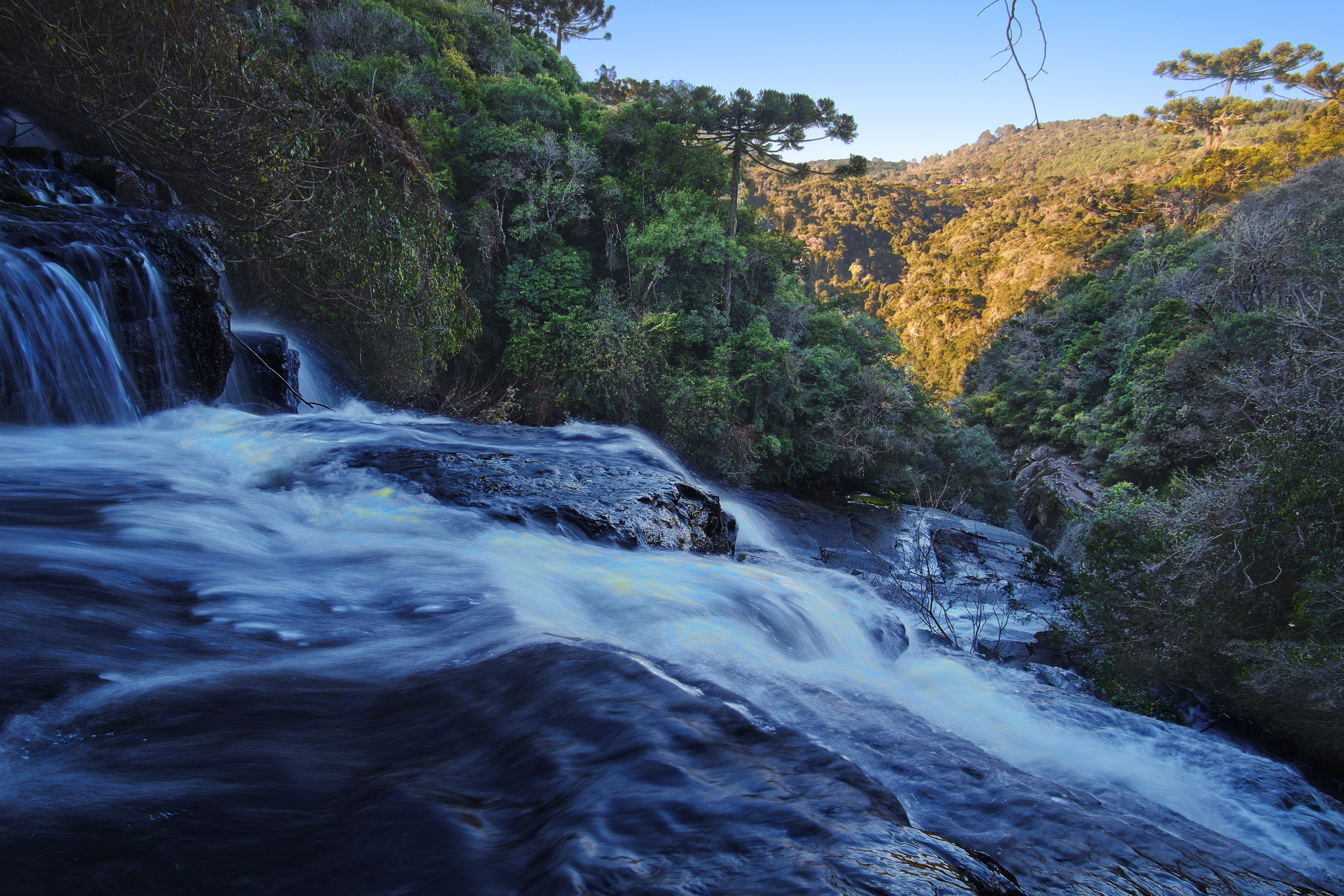

- Mouth location in Brazil
- Native name: Arroio Caracol (Portuguese)

Location
- Country: Brazil

Physical characteristics
- Mouth
  - coordinates: 29°17′17″S 50°53′24″W

Basin features
- River system: Caí River

The Caracol River Portuguese: Arroio Caracol is a river in the state of Rio Grande do Sul, Brazil. It is a tributary of the Caí River.

The Caracol River is known for the dramatic Caracol Falls, a major tourist attraction. The 100 hectares (250 acres) Caracol State Park, established in 1973, protects the environment around the falls.

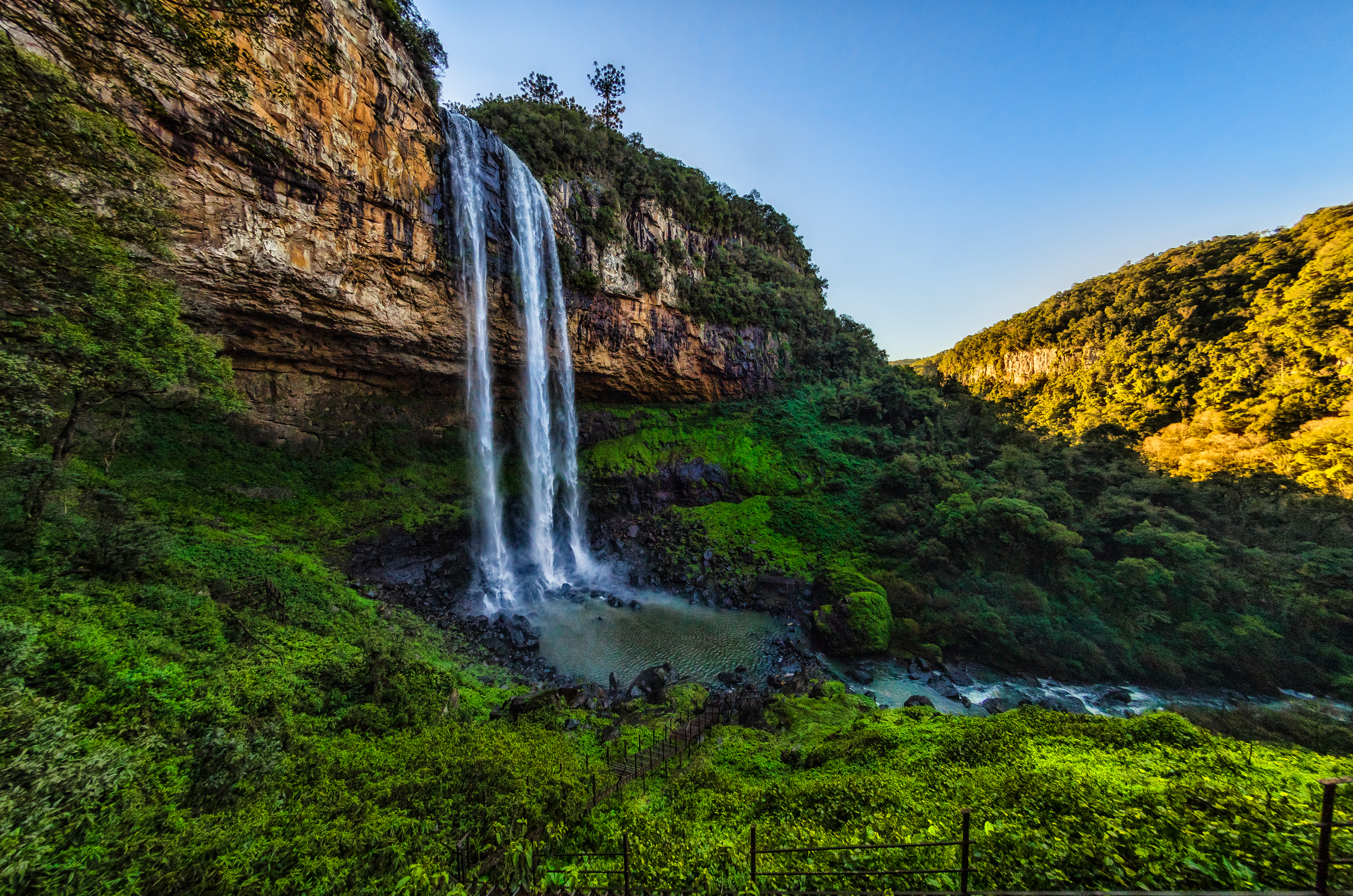
Caracol fall

== See also ==
- List of rivers of Rio Grande do Sul
