= Caracol Falls =

Waterfall in Canela, Rio Grande do Sul, Brazil

Caracol falls
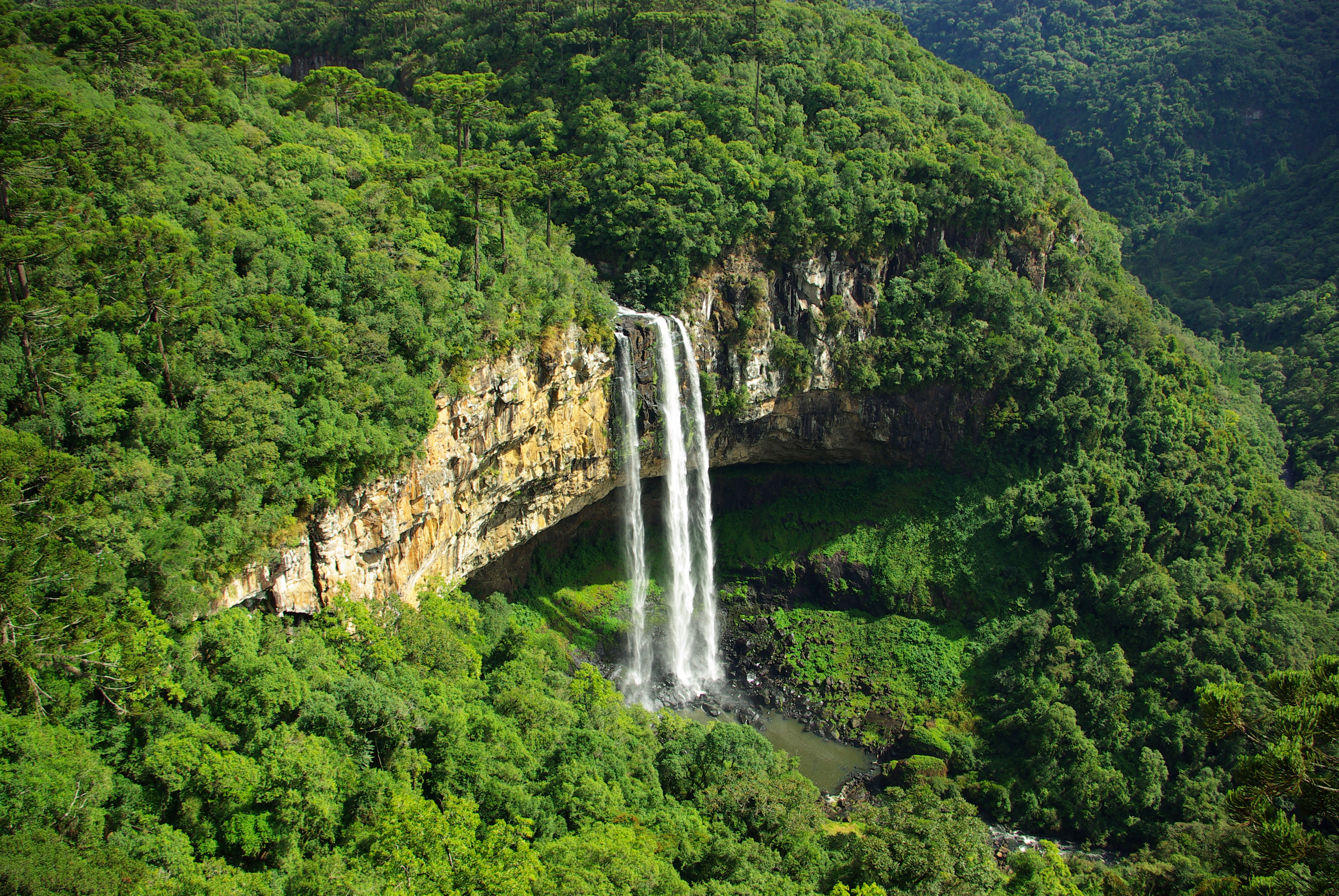

- Location within Brazil
- Location: Rio Grande do Sul, Brazil
- Coordinates: 29°18′40″S 50°51′16″W
- Type: Waterfall
- Total height: 426 feet (130 m)
- Longest drop: 426 feet (130 m)
- Total width: 115 feet (35 m)

Caracol Falls or Cascata do Caracol, is a 426-foot (130 meters) waterfall about 4.35 miles (7.00 km) from Canela, Brazil in Caracol State Park (Parque Estadual do Caracol). It is formed by the Caracol River and cuts out of basalt cliffs in the Serra Geral mountain range, falling into the Vale da Lageana. The falls are situated between the pinheiral (araucaria pine forest) zone of the Brazilian Highlands and the southern coastal Atlantic Forest. The base of the waterfall can be reached by a steep 927-step trail maintained by the Projeto Lobo-Guará.

Waterfall has formed on the basalt rocks of Serra Geral formation and has two cascades. Upper cascade is located approximately 100 m before the second cascade, which falls over an overhanging cliff ledge.

Caracol Falls has long attracted visitors and is the second most popular natural tourist attraction in Brazil, trailing only Iguazu Falls. In 2009, it received more than 289,000 visitors. There is a nearby 100-foot observation tower that offers an elevator and a panoramic view, as well as a cable car that gives tourists an aerial view of the waterfall.

The area also provides a restaurant and craft stalls.

== See also ==
- List of waterfalls
