= El Caracol, Michoacán =

Village in Hidalgo, Michoacán, Mexico

Coordinates: 19°34′12″N 100°45′19″W

El Caracol is a small village in the mountains of the Mexican state of Michoacán, in the municipality of Hidalgo. It is located off the State route of Mexico-Morelia-Guadalajara, about 12 km (7.5 mi) south of Mil Cumbres at an elevation of 2,896 metres (9,501 feet) above mean sea level. Seasonal temperatures vary from 40–79 °F (4–26 °C) July to February and 60–89 °F (16–32 °C) March to June with relatively low humidity. There are almost no mosquitoes, snakes or other pests.

== History ==
El Caracol is said to be one of the oldest villages in the region dating as far back to the mid-15th century. There are few records of its history, only tales of the native people that passed them on from generation to generation.

Folk tales tell of a very painful separation caused by two priests. One decided to relocate the village because the terrain where it was located would not allow it to grow, and most of the people followed the priest to a valley now known as San Antonio Villalongin. The rivalry started when San Antonio's priest wanted to take all the church's belongings (saints and a three-ton gold-plated bell). There are accounts of trying to drag the four foot San Isidro Labrador statue out the temple and the statue would not fit out the door. After the unsuccessful robbery the evil priest walked up the mountain to La Cruz del Toro and cursed the town.

In the late-1970s and 1980s, El Caracol was a major lumbermill center with up to 34 lumberyards, cabinetry, and bedboard making shops, producing thousands of woodcrafting products and distributing them throughout the Mexican Republic. The population of the village grew close to 5,000. The primary, tele-secondary schools, and a bigger temple were built to accommodate the increasing population.

El Caracol has been a stepping stone. In the 1950s and 1960s people from the surrounding villages migrated to El Caracol, while the natives moved to Mexico City. Similarly in the 1980s and 1990s people from El Caracol started migrating to Morelia and the United States – especially to Los Angeles, CA; Chicago, IL; and Atlanta, GA – and people from surrounding villages such as La Palma, San Juan, El Astillero and others moved to El Caracol.

Now there are only about 2,700 people left in the village, most of whom are under 15 or over 45 years old. A few left to Morelia to continue their studies and the majority are working in the United States.

== Traditions ==
Traditional village ceremonies include a re-enactment of the Birth, Last Supper and the Passion of Christ. Another big tradition is the migration on July 16 the day of La Virgen Del Carmen.

== Politics ==
- Paving El Caracol.
- Making the new road.
- Federal funds given to the town, kept by the municipality and the "chosen ones".

== Video Gallery ==
Fiesta De San Isidro Labrador 2017 https://www.youtube.com/watch?v=BT-UrMra3Ek&t=36s

Avocado Farm https://www.youtube.com/watch?v=CbIm6lV1Aiw

El Caracol y sus alrededores https://www.youtube.com/watch?v=m0cAjsripWE&t=9s

== Gallery ==
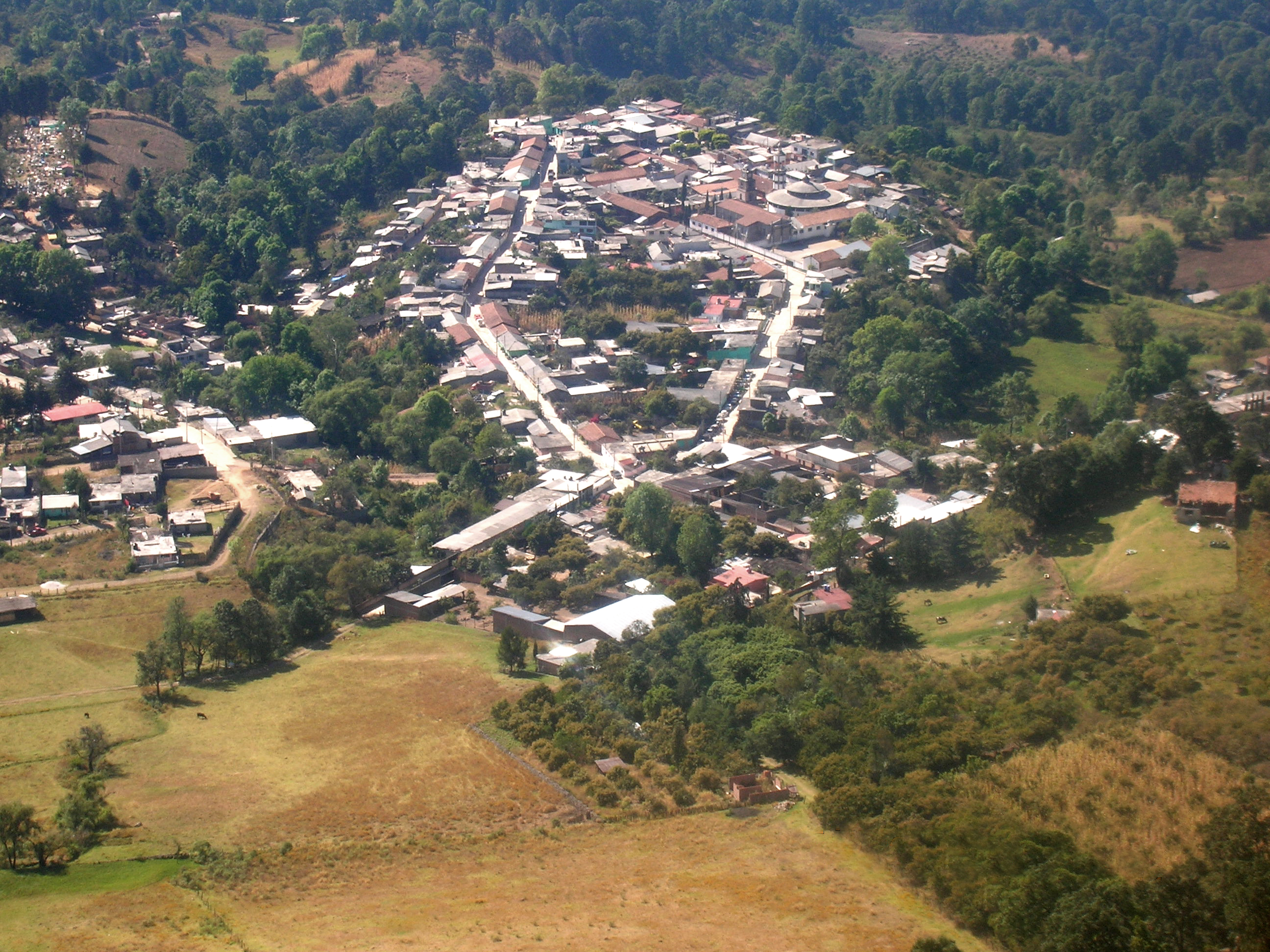
View from halfway to the top of the mountain

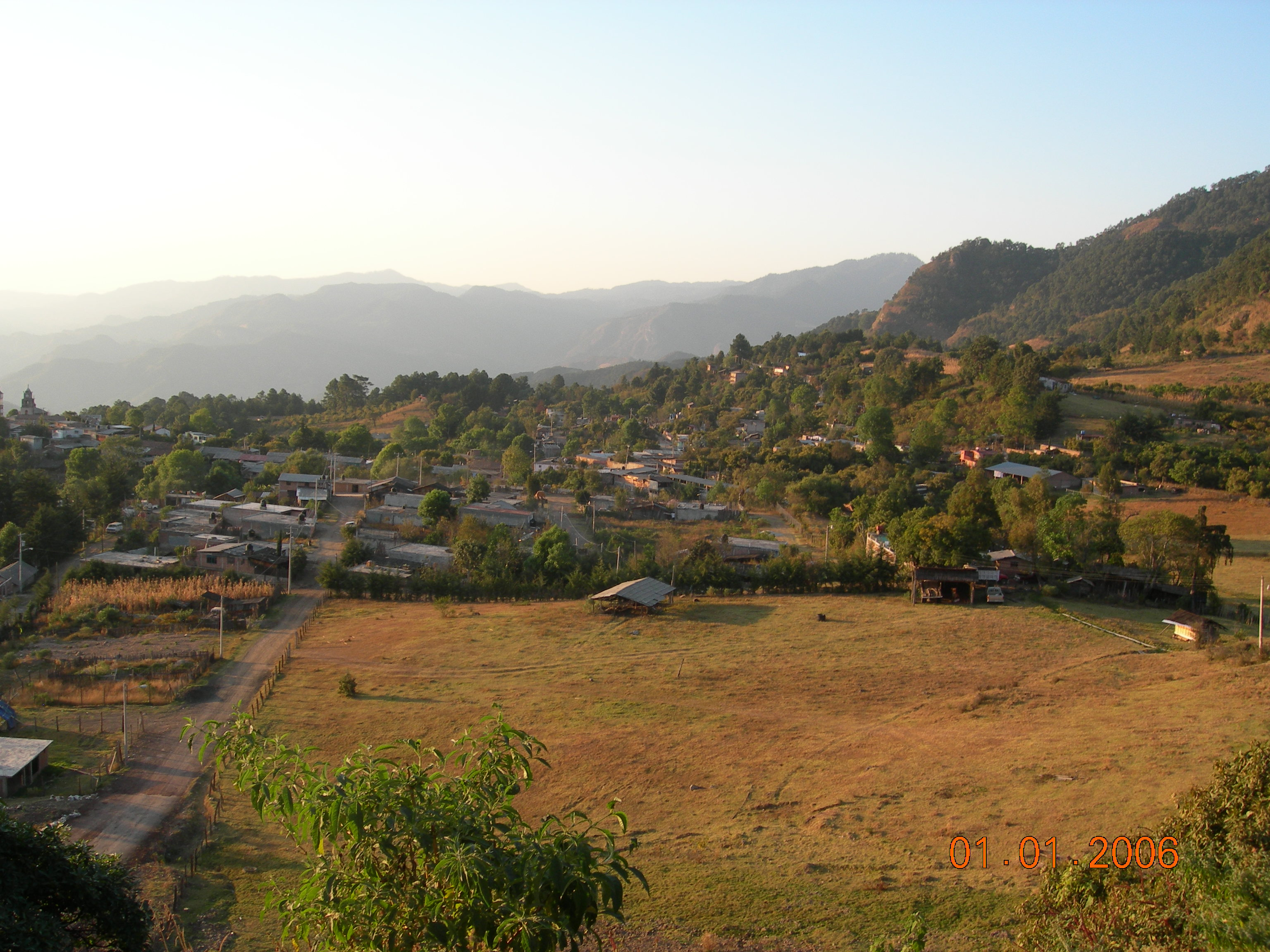
Alternate view, at sunset

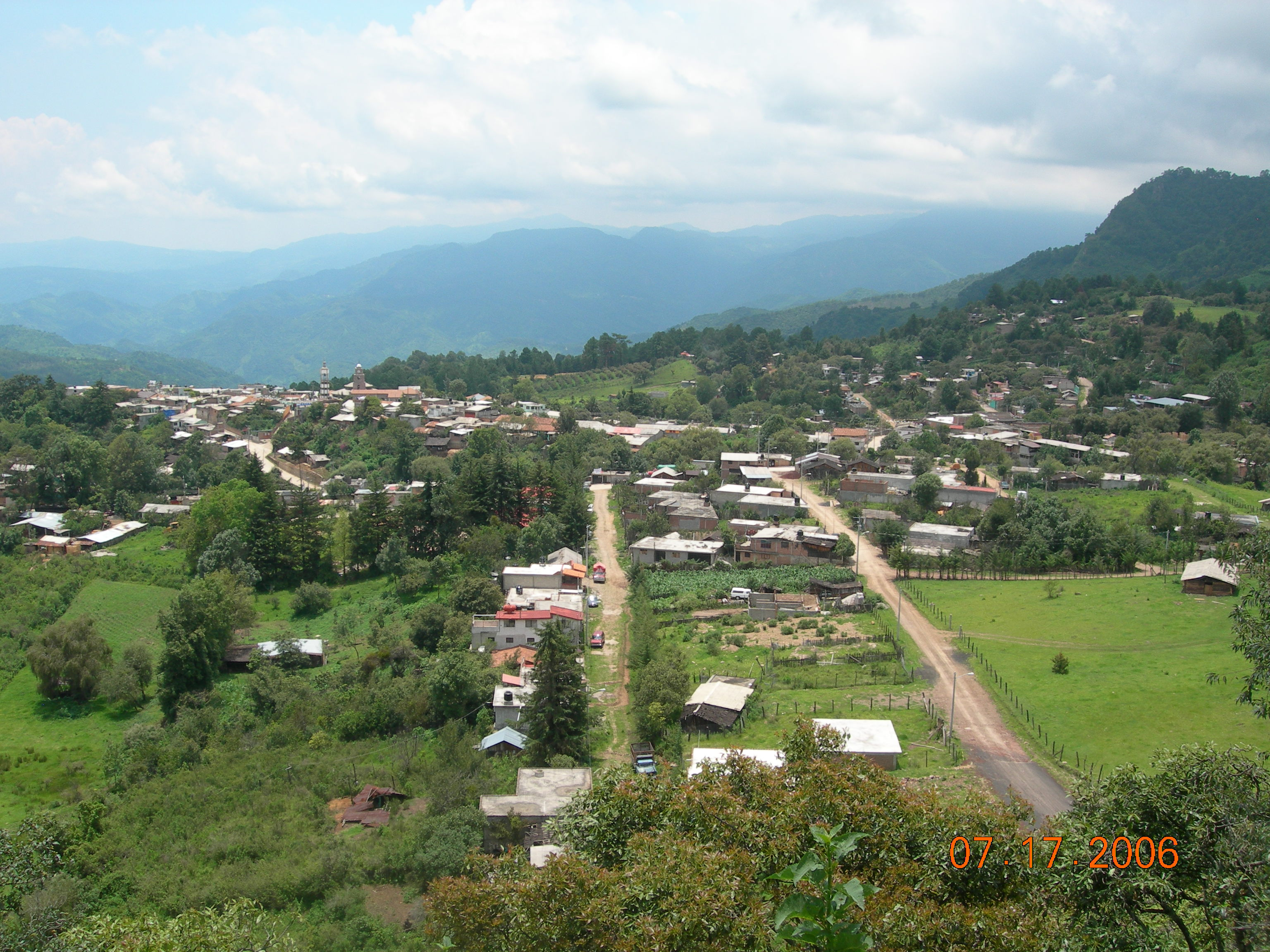
July 06

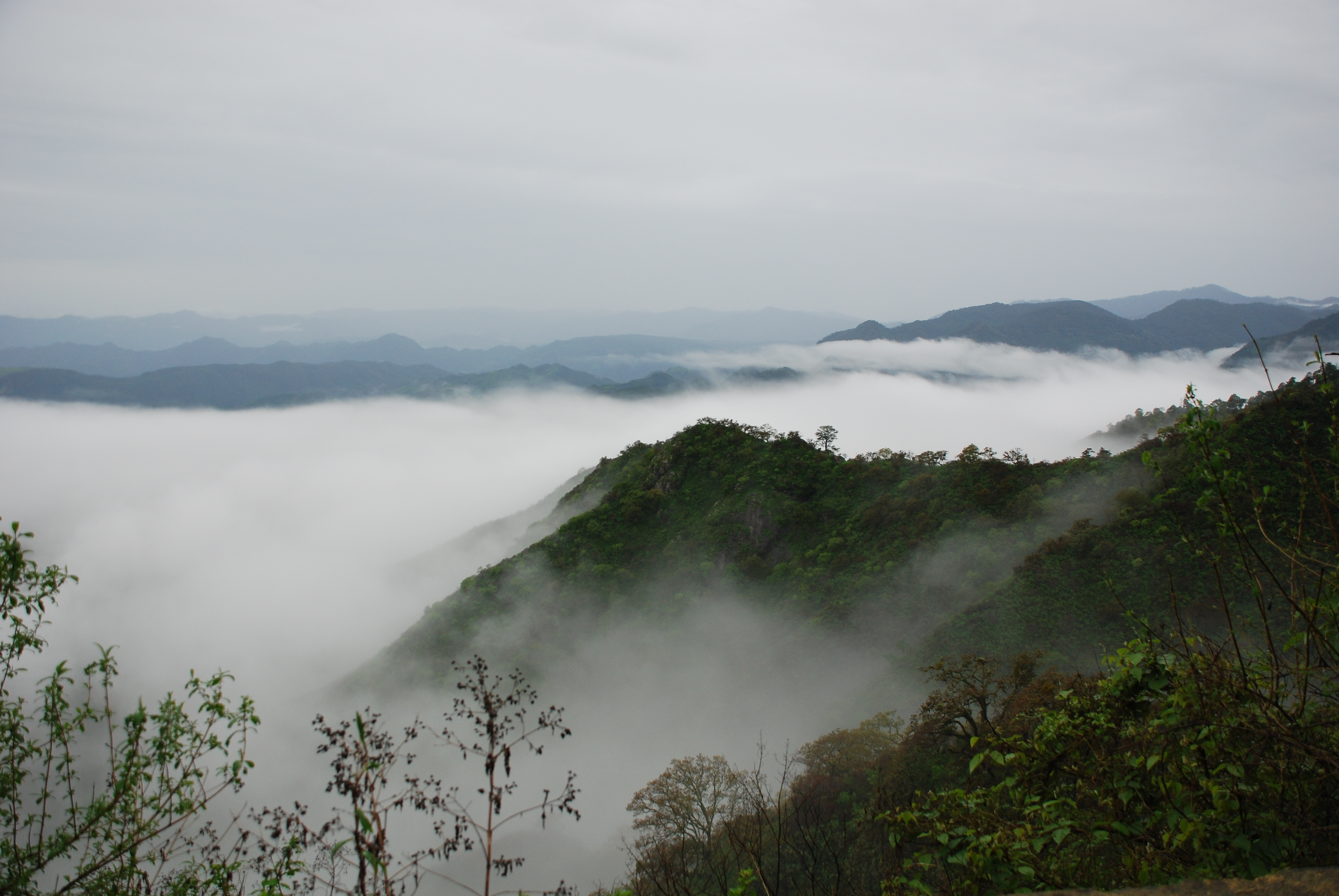
View from 1.5Km into El Caracol from Mil Cumbres (July 08)

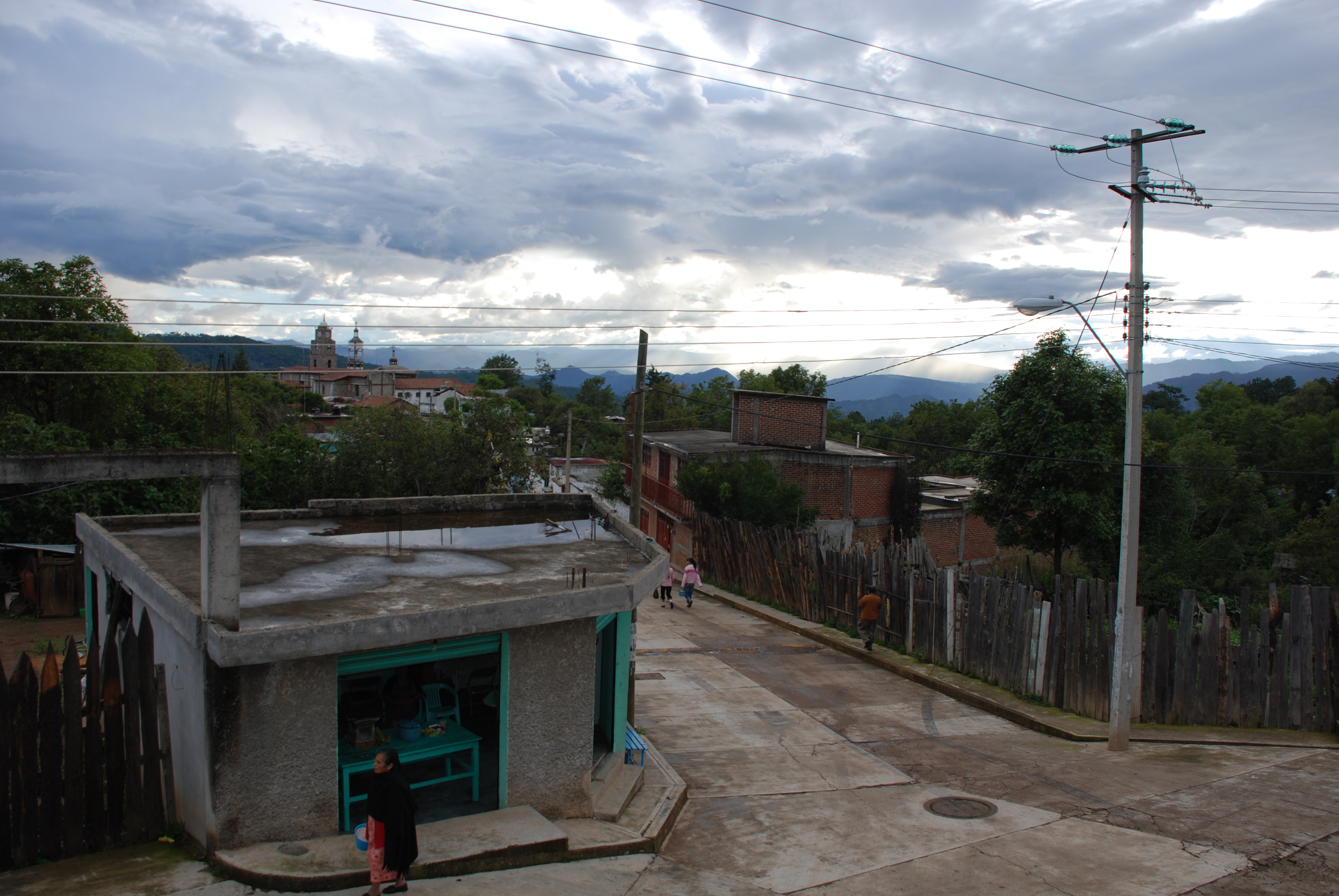
Vista de mi ventana, Julio 08.

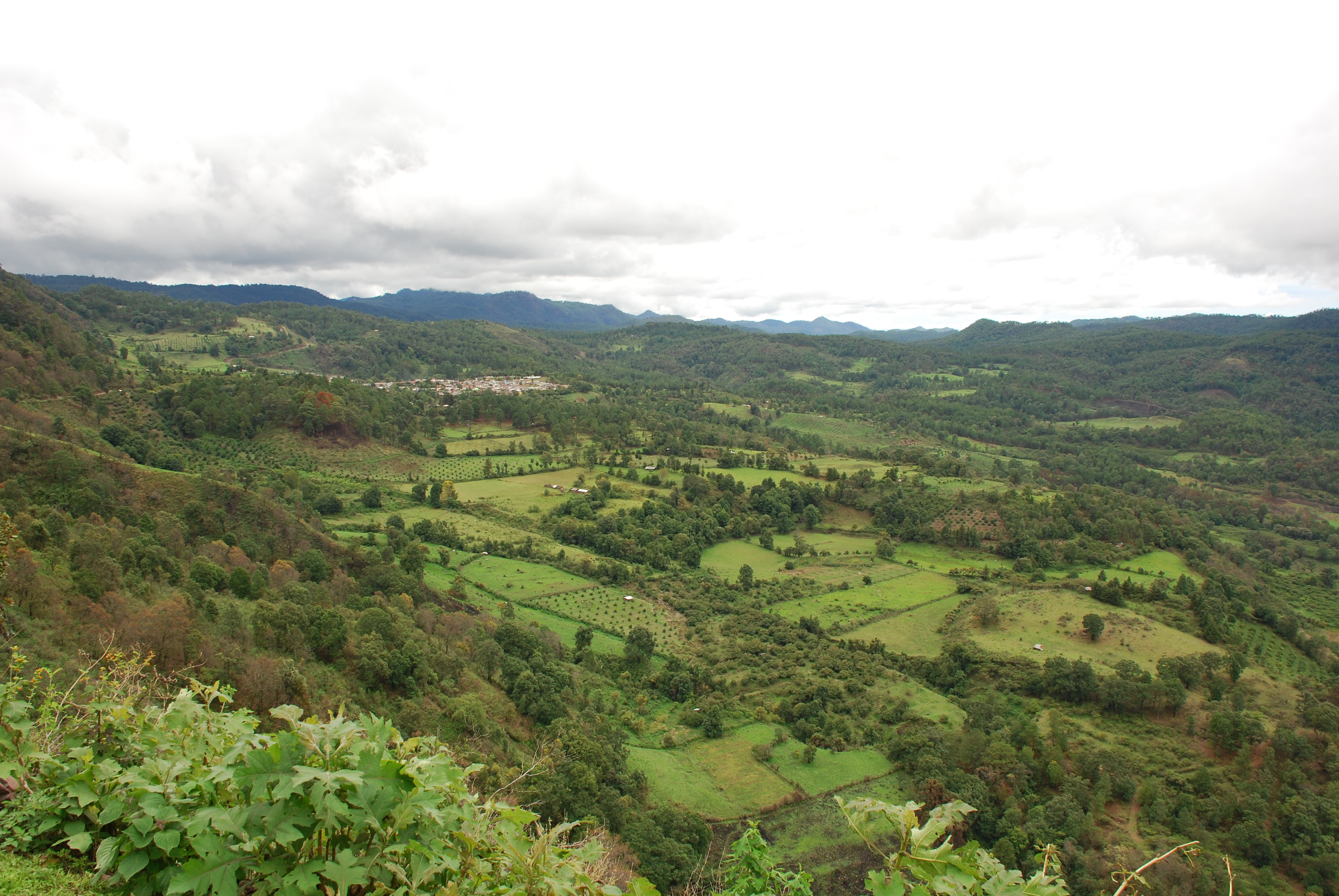
View from El Picacho

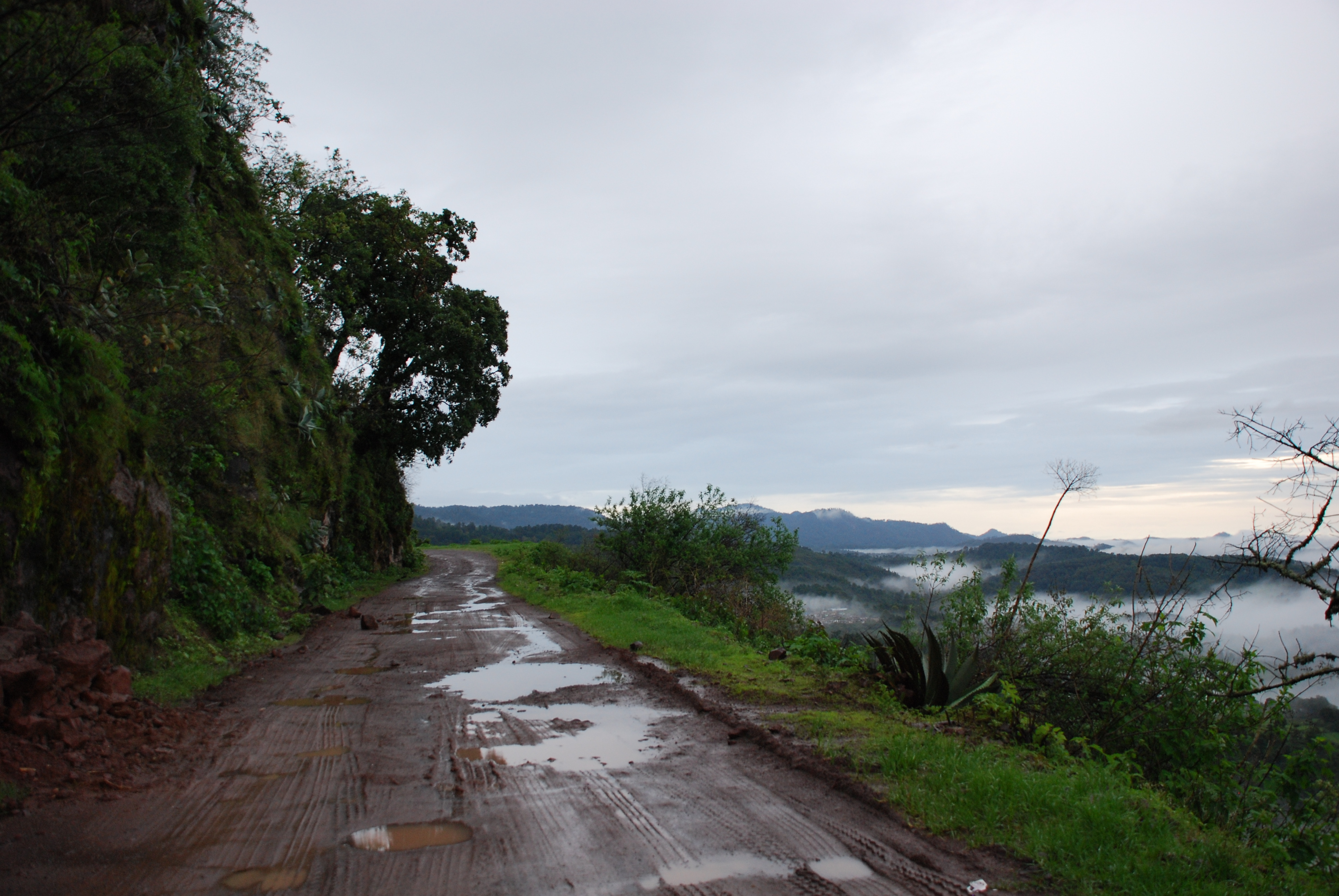
Driving on the clouds to El Caracol

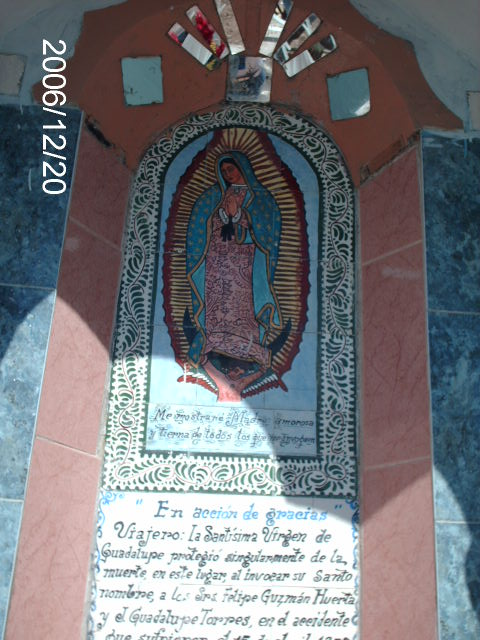
El Cantil

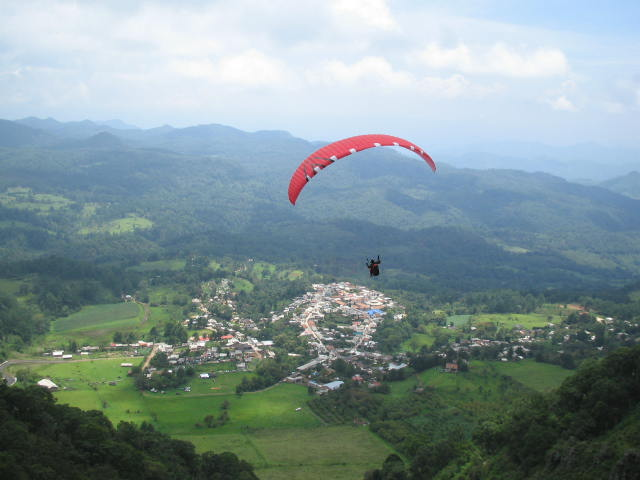
El Caracol Michoacan Lugar Turistico

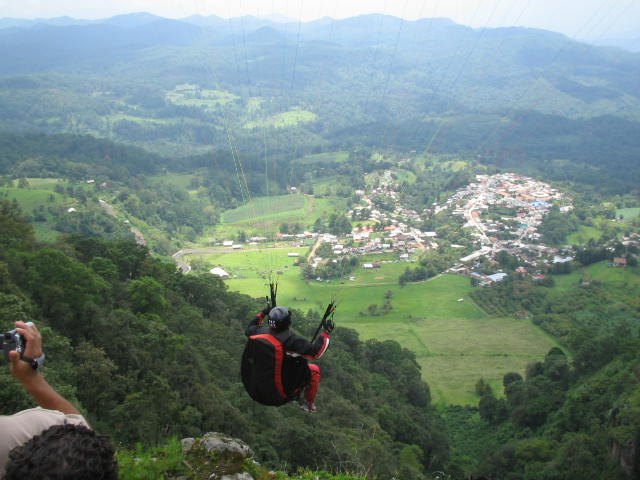
El Caracol Michoacan Lugar Turistico

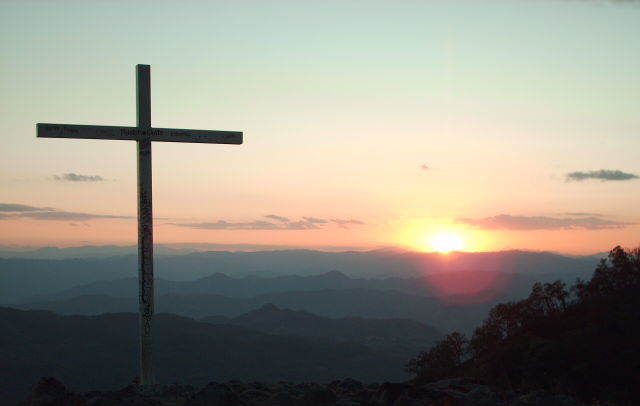
Atardecer en la Cruz del Toro

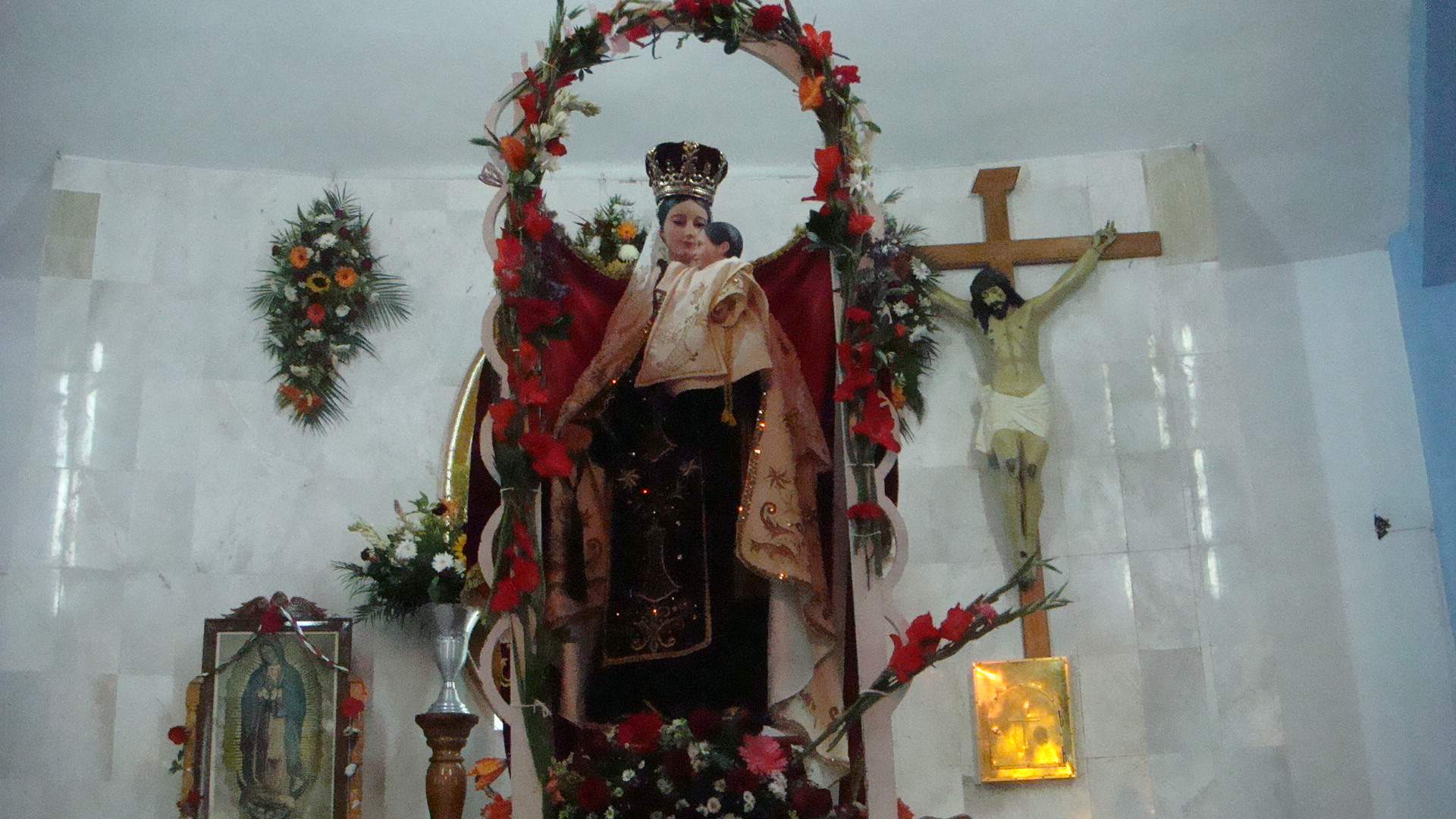
Julio 2008 Santisima Virgen del Carmen

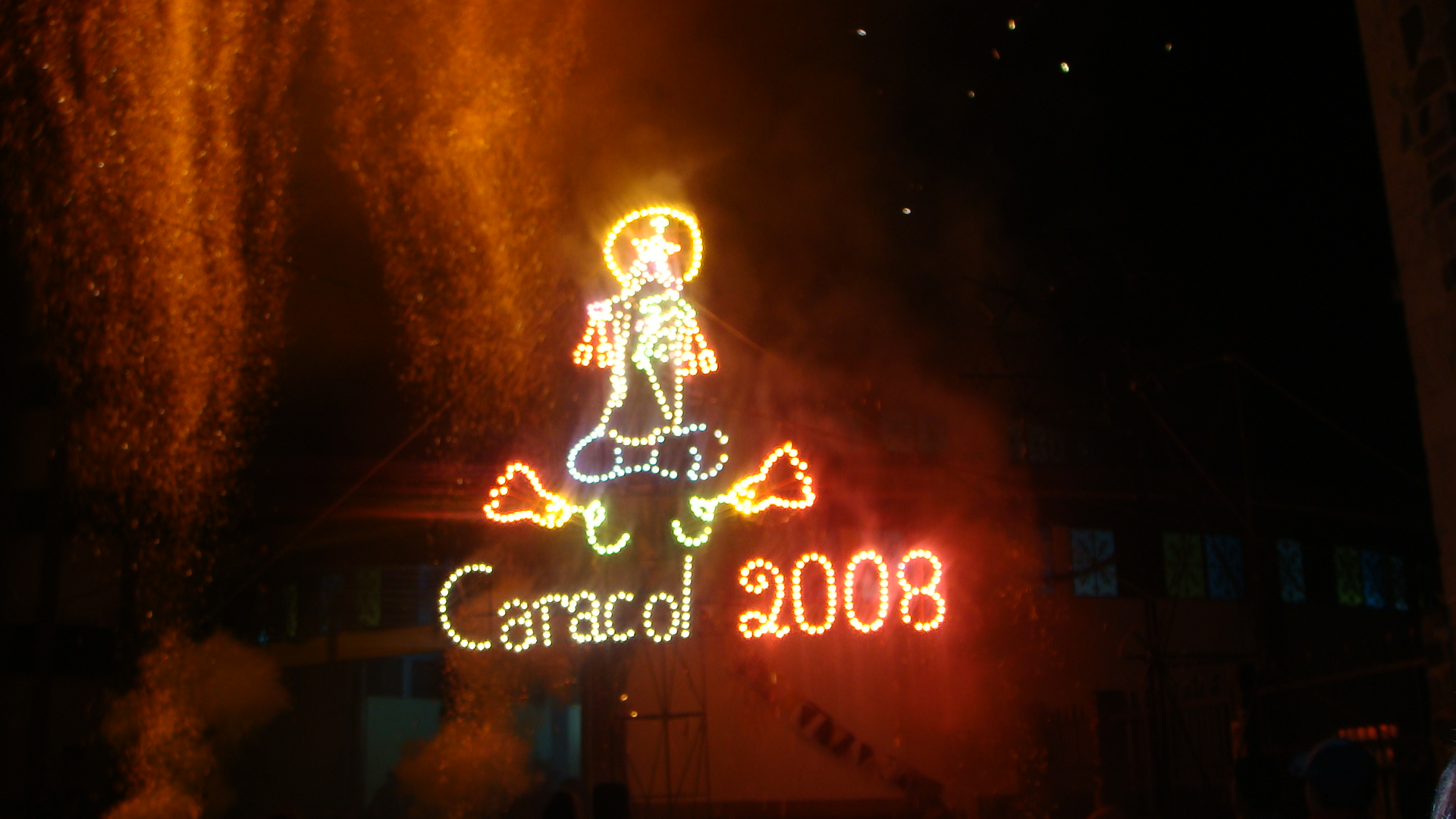
Julio 2008 Fiesta de la Santisima Virgen del Carmen

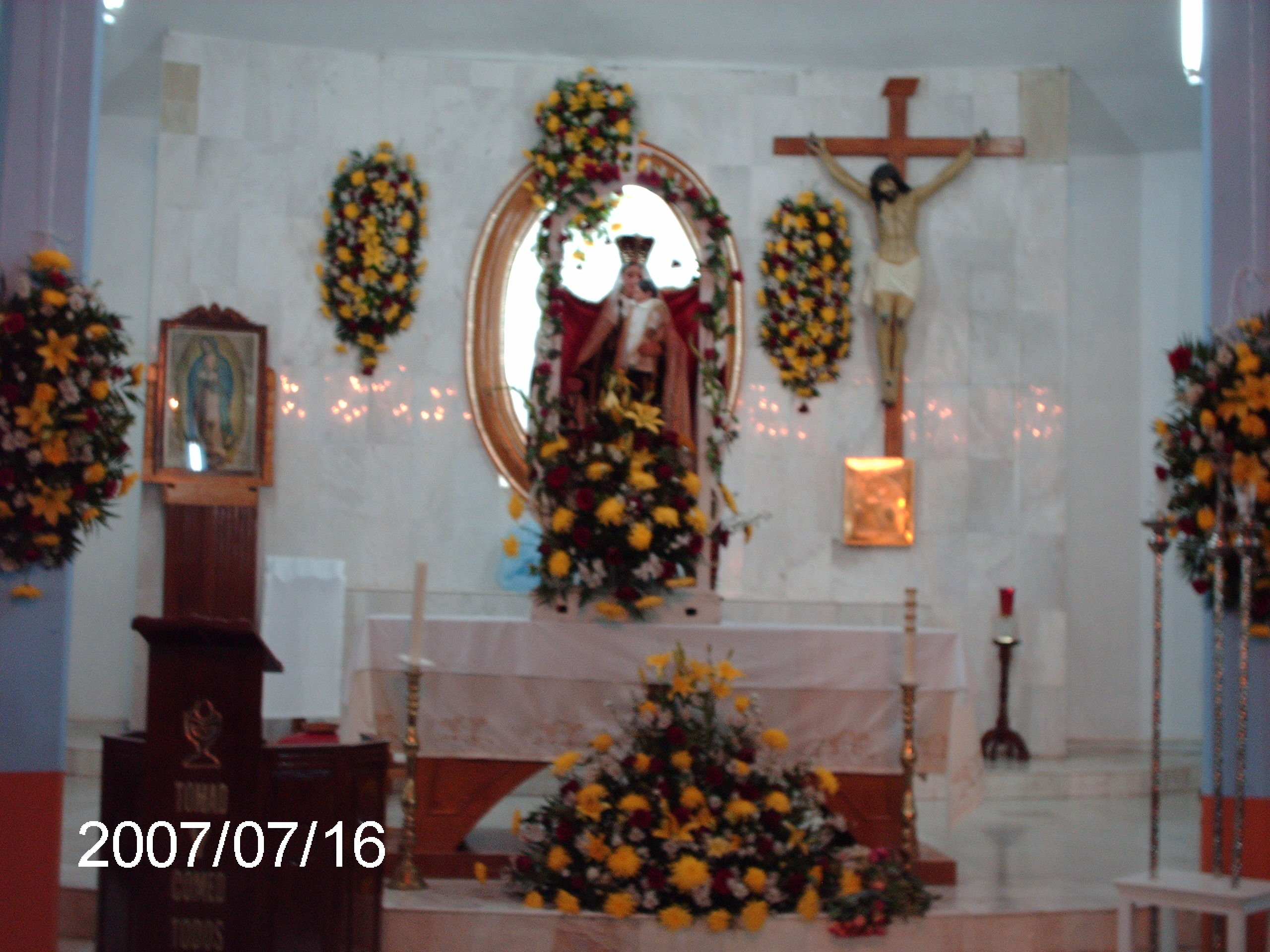
Julio 2007
