= Karakul, Bashkortostan =

Karakul Каракул
- Village
- Location within Bashkortostan Location within Russia
- Coordinates: 54°28′N 56°32′E
- Country: Russia
- Region: Bashkortostan
- District: Arkhangelsky District
- Time zone: UTC+5:00

Karakul (Russian: Каракул; Bashkir: Ҡаракүл, Qarakül) is a rural locality (a village) in Irnykshinsky Selsoviet, Arkhangelsky District, Bashkortostan, Russia. The population was 44 as of 2010. There are 2 streets.

== Geography ==
Karakul is located 19 km northwest of Arkhangelskoye (the district's administrative centre) by road. Berezovka is the nearest rural locality.
