= Karakul, Republic of Bashkortostan =

Karakul Каракуль
- Village
- Location within Bashkortostan Location within Russia
- Coordinates: 54°14′N 56°23′E
- Country: Russia
- Region: Bashkortostan
- District: Karmaskalinsky District
- Time zone: UTC+5:00

Karakul (Russian: Каракуль; Bashkir: Ҡаракүл, Qarakül) is a rural locality (a village) in Kamyshlinsky Selsoviet, Karmaskalinsky District, Bashkortostan, Russia. The population was 55 as of 2010. There is 1 street.

== Geography ==
Karakul is located 27 km southeast of Karmaskaly (the district's administrative centre) by road. Malayevo is the nearest rural locality.
