= Karakol, Ongudaysky District, Altai Republic =

Karakol Каракол
- Selo
- Location within Altai Republic Location within Russia
- Coordinates: 50°48′N 85°56′E
- Country: Russia
- Region: Altai Republic
- District: Ongudaysky District
- Time zone: UTC+7:00

Karakol (Russian: Каракол; Altay: Кара-Коол, Kara-Kool) is a rural locality (a selo) and the administrative centre of Karakolskoye Rural Settlement, Ongudaysky District, the Altai Republic, Russia. The population was 411 as of 2016. There are 6 streets.

== Geography ==
Karakol is located 17 km northwest of Onguday (the district's administrative centre) by road. Kurota is the nearest rural locality.
