= Flag of Altai Republic =

Altai Republic
- Proportion: 2:3
- Adopted: 29 June 1994; 11 March 2016
- Relinquished: 24 April 2003
- Design: Four stripe bicolour of white, light blue, white, and light blue
- Designed by: Vladimir Chukuyev

The state flag of the Altai Republic (Note: Russian: Государственный Флаг Республики Алтай, Altay: Алтай Республиканыҥ эл-тергеелик маанызы) in southeastern Russia is a four stripe bicolour of light blue and white. The width of the stripes, from top to bottom, are 67+4+4+25. The white symbolizes eternity, tendency to revival, love, and the consent of the peoples within the republic. The blue symbolizes cleanliness, mountains, rivers, lakes, and heaven.

The flag was designed by artist V. P. Chukuyev. It was adopted on 2 July 1992, with the proportions of 1:2. The proportions were changed to 2:3 on 29 June 1994, 1:2 on 24 April 2003 and 2:3 on 22 March 2016.

== History ==
=== Before 1990 ===
Flag	Years of use	Ratio	Government	Description
	1917	1:2	Karakorum Government	The first national flag created by Grigory Gurkin
	1918–1921	2:3	First Confederated Republic of Altai	The flag of the Confederated Republic of Altai, a short-lived independent state during the Russian Civil War
	1921–1922	2:3	Second Confederated Republic of Altai	

=== After 1990 ===
In 1990, the Gorno-Altai Autonomous Oblast upgraded itself to the Gorno-Altai Soviet Socialist Republic. The next year the republic held a competition to design a new flag. Several submitted designs mimicked the Russian tricolour in variation; two depicting an enlarged blue stripe and a smaller white and red stripe. White stood for the Altai Mountains and the nobility of the people, blue for the Turkic peoples and the skies above the republic, and red for the peoples fight for freedom.

Flag	Use	Description	Ref.
	Flag proposal from 1991 by Alexander Basov.		

== Other submissions ==
Other designs submitted for the flag of the Altai Republic as catalogued by the republic's Archives Committee.

Flag	Authors	Description
	Design by an unknown author.	
	Design by Ignatiy Ortonulov.	
	Design by an unknown author.	
	Design by Nelly Kazitova.	
	Design by an unknown author.	
	Design by an unknown author.	
	Design by an unknown author.	
	Design by Friedrich Taushkanov.	
	Design by Gennady Kebekov.	
	Design by Alchibaev (no last name provided).	A vertical tricolor of white, blue and green, with a red star on the upper left corner.
	Design by Alchibaev (no last name provided).	A green field with a white circle and in the middle of the circle is a red star.
	Design by Nikolai Chichkanov.	
	Design by Alexei Edokov.	
	Design by an unknown author.	
	Design by Vladimir Chukuyev.	
	Design by Anatoly Shadrin.	

== Other ==
=== Administrative divisions ===
Flag	Date	Use	Ref.
	28 August 2020–present	Flag of Gorno-Altaysk	
	28 March 2020–present	Flag of Kosh-Agachsky District	
	28 December 2019–present	Flag of Mayminsky District	
	23 December 2003 – 28 December 2019	Flag of Mayminsky District	
	24 December 2019–present	Flag of Ongudaysky District	
	26 December 2019–present	Flag of Turochaksky District	
	12 March 2020–present	Flag of Ulagansky District	
	28 December 2004 – 12 March 2020	Flag of Ulagansky District	
	26 December 2019–present	Flag of Ust-Kansky District	
	17 January 2003 – 26 December 2019	Flag of Ust-Kansky District	
	30 December 2019–present	Flag of Ust-Koksinsky District	
	13 December 2019–present	Flag of Chemalsky District	
	19 December 2019–present	Flag of Choysky District	
	28 November 2003 – 19 December 2019	Flag of Choysky District	
	25 December 2019–present	Flag of Shebalinsky District	

=== Settlements ===
Flag	Date	Use	Ref.
	?–present	Flag of the Nizhne-Taldinskoye rural settlement	
	?–present	Flag of the Artybashskoye Rural Settlement	
