= Anos =

Anos may refer to the following places:

- Anos, Pyrénées-Atlantiques, France
- Anos, Russia
- Anos, Spain
- Verkh-Anos, Altai Republic, Russia

== See also ==
Because anos and años mean "years" in Portuguese and Spanish respectively, these words appear in countless toponyms and titles:
