= Turata =

Turata Турата
- Selo

Other transcription(s)
  - Altai: Тураты
- Interactive map of Turata
- Location within Altai Republic Location within Russia
- Coordinates: 51°18′N 84°46′E
- Country: Russia
- Federal subject: Altai Republic
- Elevation: 777 m (2,549 ft)

Population
  - Estimate (2016): 170 )
- Time zone: UTC+6 (MSK+3)
- Postal code: 649453
- OKTMO ID: 84635480111

Turata (Russian: Турата; Altay: Тураты, Turatı) is a rural locality (a selo) in Ust-Kansky District, the Altai Republic, Russia. The population was 170 as of 2016. There are 2 streets.

== Geography ==
Turata is located 55 km north of Ust-Kan, the district's administrative centre, by road. Chyorny Anuy is the nearest rural locality.
