= Askat =

Askat Аскат
- Village
- Location within Altai Republic Location within Russia
- Coordinates: 51°32′N 85°53′E
- Country: Russia
- Region: Altai Republic
- District: Chemalsky District
- Time zone: UTC+7:00

Askat (Russian: Аскат; Altay: Аскат) is a rural locality (a selo) in Uznezinskoye Rural Settlement of Chemalsky District, the Altai Republic, Russia. The population was 227 as of 2016. There are 12 streets.

== Geography ==
Askat is located on the left bank of the Katun River, south from Gorno-Altaysk, 19 km north of Chemal (the district's administrative centre) by road. Turbaza "Katun" is the nearest rural locality.
