= Uznezya =

Uznezya Узнезя
- Village
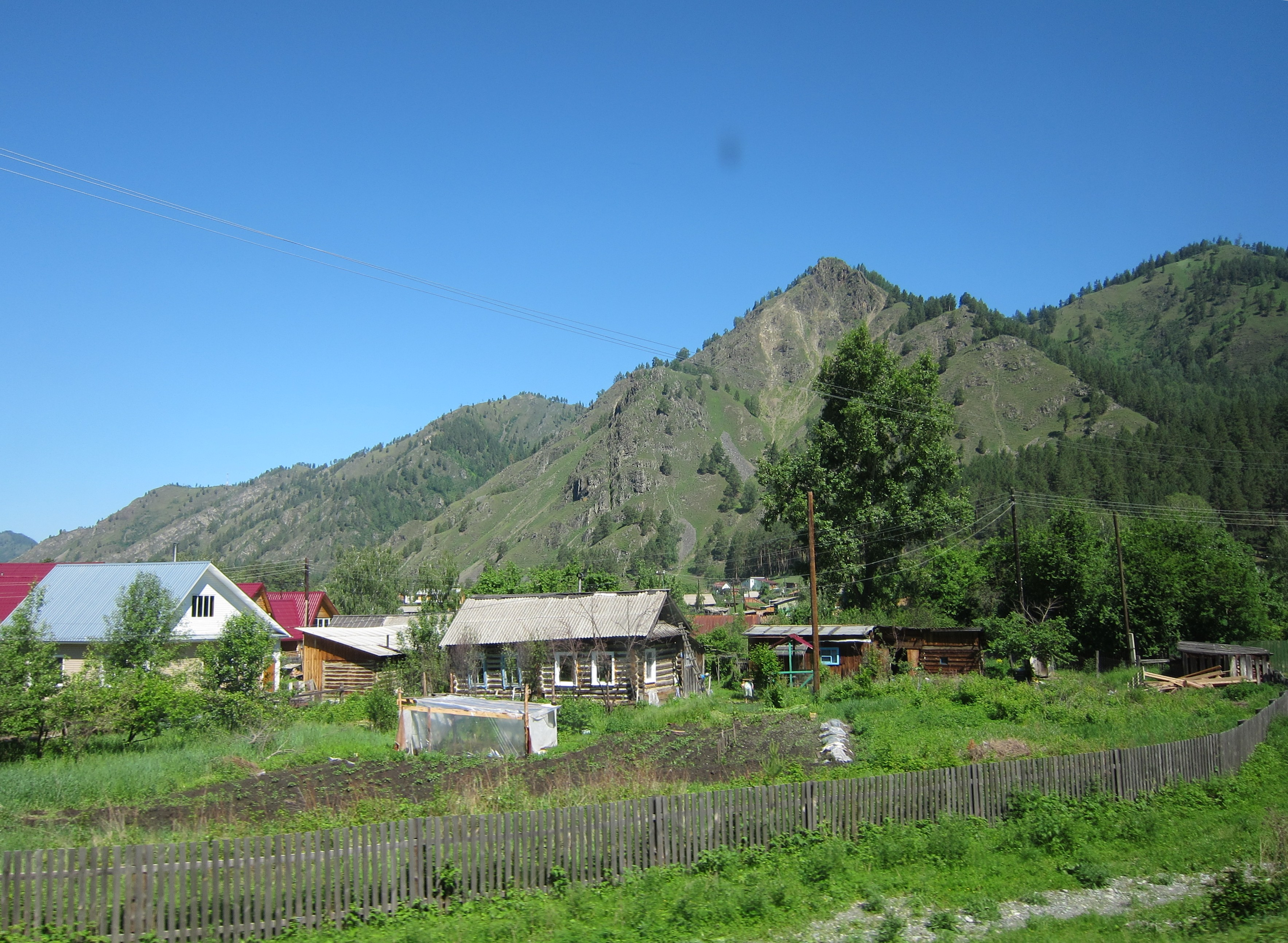

- Location within Altai Republic Location within Russia
- Coordinates: 51°31′N 85°56′E
- Country: Russia
- Region: Altai Republic
- District: Chemalsky District
- Time zone: UTC+7:00

Uznezya (Russian: Узнезя; Altay: Ӱзнези, Üznezi) is a rural locality (a selo) and the administrative centre of Uznezinskoye Rural Settlement of Chemalsky District, the Altai Republic, Russia. The population was 501 as of 2016. There are 16 streets.

== Geography ==
The village is located on the right bank of the Katun River, 16 km north of Chemal (the district's administrative centre) by road. Anos is the nearest rural locality.
