= Elanda =

Elanda Еланда
- Village
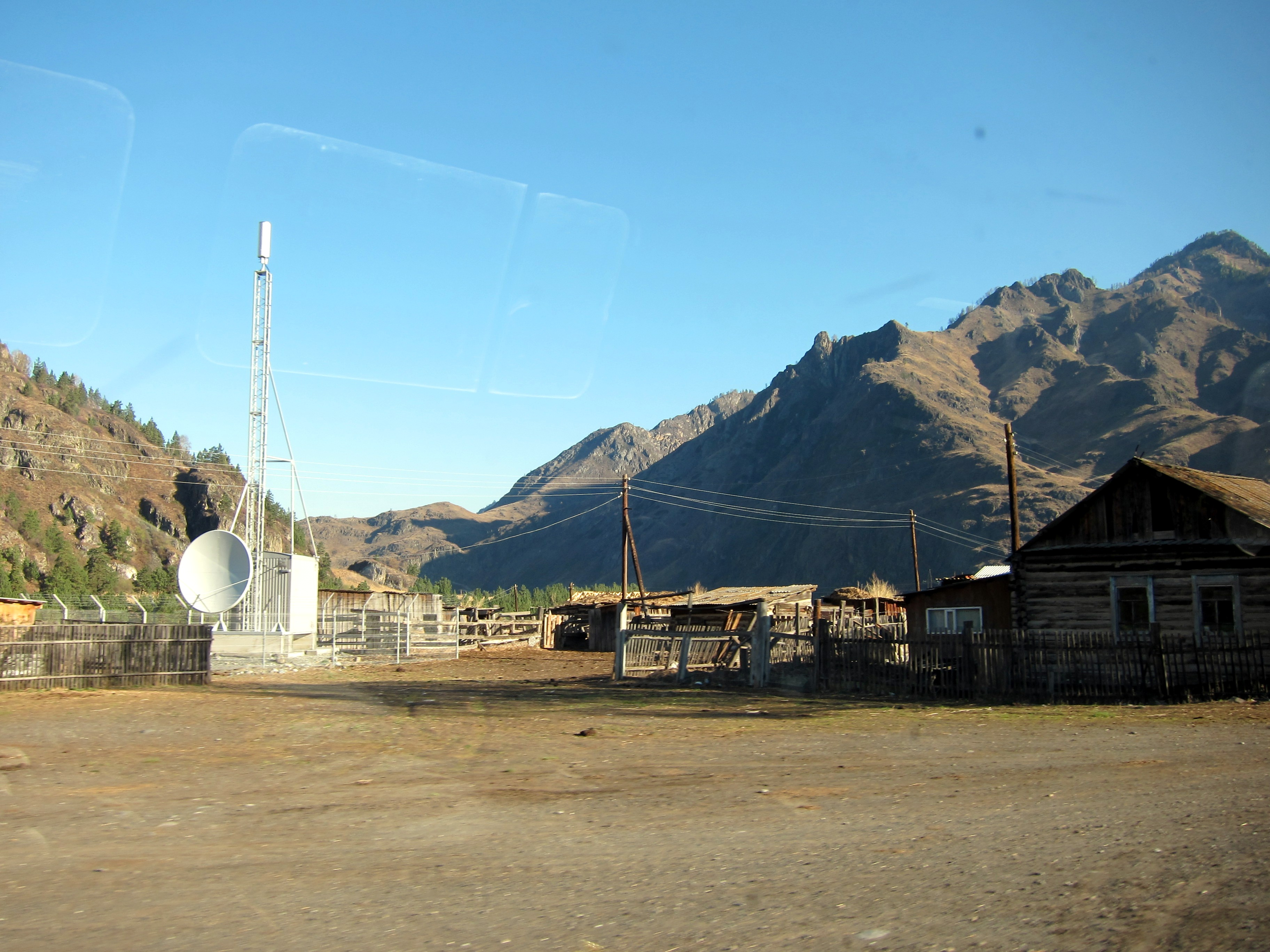
- A street in Elanda

- Location within Altai Republic Location within Russia
- Coordinates: 51°13′N 86°05′E
- Country: Russia
- Region: Altai Republic
- District: Chemalsky District
- Time zone: UTC+7:00

Elanda (Russian: Еланда; Altay: Јыланду, Ĵılandu) is a rural locality (a selo) in Chemalskoye Rural Settlement of Chemalsky District, the Altai Republic, Russia. The population was 154 as of 2016. There are 2 streets.

== Geography ==
Elanda is located in the valley of the Katun River, 26 km south of Chemal (the district's administrative centre) by road. Tolgoyek is the nearest rural locality.
