= Cheposh =

Cheposh Чепош
- Village
- Location within Altai Republic Location within Russia
- Coordinates: 51°35′N 85°50′E
- Country: Russia
- Region: Altai Republic
- District: Chemalsky District
- Time zone: UTC+7:00

Cheposh (Russian: Чепош; Altay: Чопош, Çopoş) is a rural locality (a selo) and the administrative centre of Cheposhskoye Rural Settlement of Chemalsky District, the Altai Republic, Russia. The population was 739 as of 2016. There are 9 streets.

== Geography ==
Cheposh is located in the valley of the Katun River, 28 km northwest of Chemal (the district's administrative centre) by road. Turbaza "Katun" is the nearest rural locality.
