= Turbaza "Katun" =

Turbaza "Katun" Турбаза «Катунь»
- Village
- Location within Altai Republic Location within Russia
- Coordinates: 51°32′N 85°54′E
- Country: Russia
- Region: Altai Republic
- District: Chemalsky District
- Time zone: UTC+7:00

Turbaza "Katun" (Russian: Турбаза «Катунь»; Altay: Турбаза «Кадын», Turbaza "Kadın") is a rural locality (a selo) in Uznezinskoye Rural Settlement of Chemalsky District, the Altai Republic, Russia. The population was 120 as of 2016. There are 4 streets.

== Geography ==
Turbaza "Katun" is located in the valley of the Katun River, 19 km north of Chemal (the district's administrative centre) by road. Askat is the nearest rural locality.
