= Ayula =

Ayula Аюла
- Village
- Location within Altai Republic Location within Russia
- Coordinates: 51°26′N 85°58′E
- Country: Russia
- Region: Altai Republic
- District: Chemalsky District
- Time zone: UTC+7:00

Ayula (Russian: Аюла; Altay: Айулу, Ayulu) is a rural locality (a selo) in Anosinskoye Rural Settlement of Chemalsky District, the Altai Republic, Russia. The population was 295 as of 2016. There are 6 streets.

== Geography ==
Ayula is located in the valley of the Katun River, south from Gorno-Altaysk, 13 km north of Chemal (the district's administrative centre) by road. Chemal is the nearest rural locality.
