= Tolgoyek =

Tolgoyek Толгоек
- Village
- Location within Altai Republic Location within Russia
- Coordinates: 51°20′N 86°03′E
- Country: Russia
- Region: Altai Republic
- District: Chemalsky District
- Time zone: UTC+7:00

Tolgoyek (Russian: Толгоек; Altay: Толгойок, Tolgoyok) is a rural locality (a selo) in Chemalskoye Rural Settlement of Chemalsky District, the Altai Republic, Russia. The population was 153 as of 2016. There is 1 street.

== Geography ==
Tolgoyek is located in the valley of the Katun River, 12 km southeast of Chemal (the district's administrative centre) by road. Chemal is the nearest rural locality.
