= Karakol, Russia =

Karakol Каракол
- Village
- Location within Altai Republic Location within Russia
- Coordinates: 51°27′N 86°14′E
- Country: Russia
- Region: Altai Republic
- District: Chemalsky District
- Time zone: UTC+7:00

Karakol (Russian: Каракол; Altay: Каракол) is a rural locality (a selo) in Elekmonarskoye Rural Settlement of Chemalsky District, the Altai Republic, Russia. The population was 5 as of 2016.

== Geography ==
The village is located 25 km from Elekmonar village.
