= Chyorny Anuy =

Chyorny Anuy Чёрный Ануй
- Selo

Other transcription(s)
  - Altai: Чаргы-Оозы
- Interactive map of Chyorny Anuy
- Location within Altai Republic Location within Russia
- Coordinates: 51°21′N 84°43′E
- Country: Russia
- Federal subject: Altai Republic
- Elevation: 711 m (2,333 ft)

Population
  - Estimate (2016): 576 )
- Time zone: UTC+6 (MSK+3)
- Postal code: 649453
- OKTMO ID: 84635480101

Chyorny Anuy (Russian: Чёрный Ануй; Altay: Чаргы-Оозы, Çargı-Oozı) is a rural locality (a selo) and the administrative centre of Chyornoanuyskoye Rural Settlement, Ust-Kansky District, the Altai Republic, Russia. The population was 576 as of 2016. There are 8 streets.

== Geography ==
Chyorny Anuy is located 57 km north of Ust-Kan (the district's administrative centre) by road. Turata is the nearest rural locality.
