= Elekmonar =

Elekmonar Элекмонар
- Village
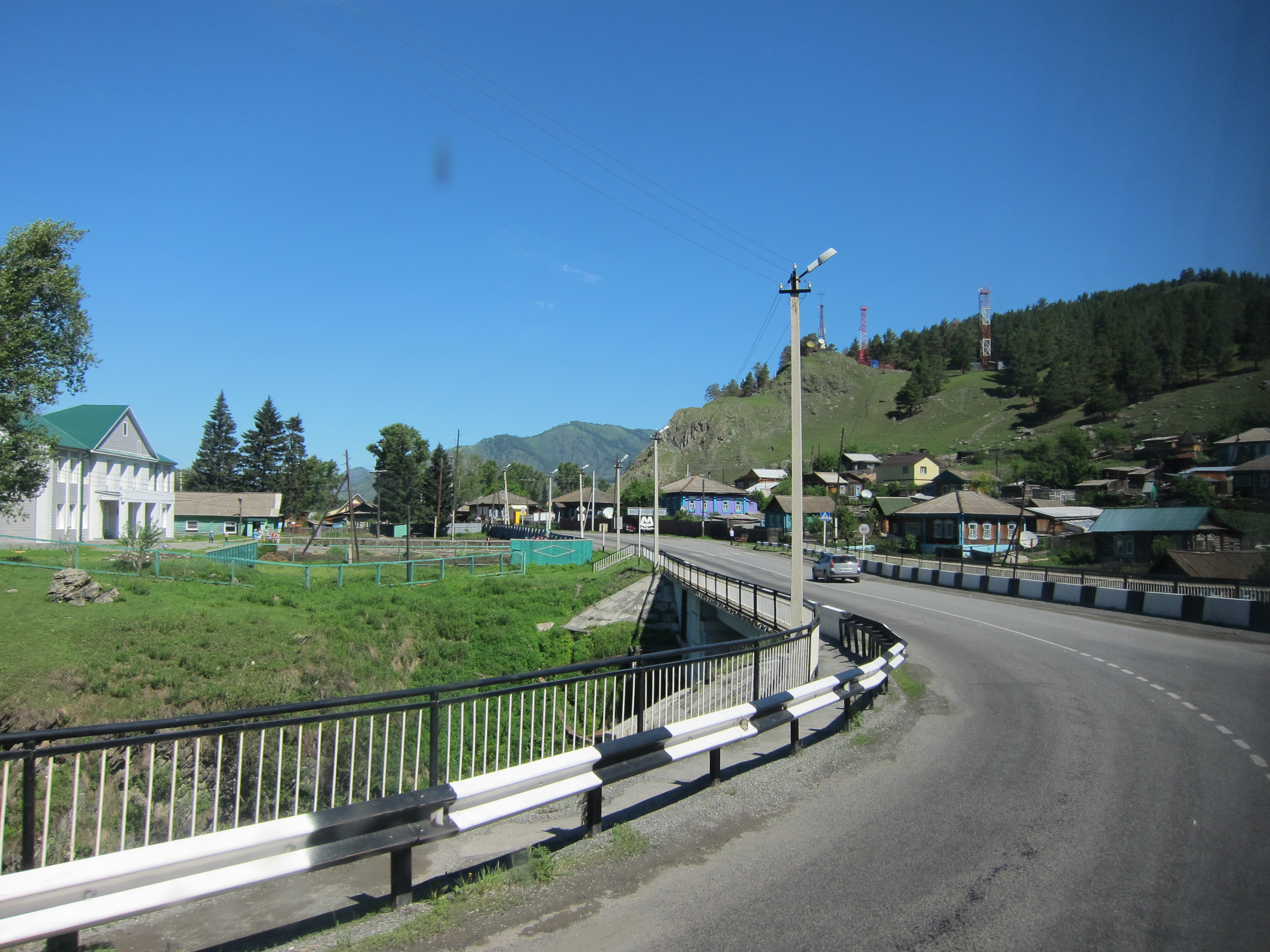

- Location within Altai Republic Location within Russia
- Coordinates: 51°27′N 85°59′E
- Country: Russia
- Region: Altai Republic
- District: Chemalsky District
- Time zone: UTC+7:00

Elekmonar (Russian: Элекмонар; Altay: Эликманар, Elikmanar) is a rural locality (a selo) and the administrative centre of Elekmonarskoye Rural Settlement of Chemalsky District, the Altai Republic, Russia. The population was 1895 as of 2016. There are 5 streets.

== Geography ==
Elekmonar is located on northeast of Altai Mountains at the confluence of the Elekmonar River in the Katun River, 6 km north of Chemal (the district's administrative centre) by road. Chemal is the nearest rural locality.
