= Nizhny Kuyum =

Nizhny Kuyum Нижний Куюм
- Village
- Location within Altai Republic Location within Russia
- Coordinates: 51°34′N 86°06′E
- Country: Russia
- Region: Altai Republic
- District: Chemalsky District
- Time zone: UTC+7:00

Nizhny Kuyum (Russian: Нижний Куюм; Altay: Алтыгы Куйум, Altıgı Kuyum) is a rural locality (a selo) in Uznezinskoye Rural Settlement of Chemalsky District, the Altai Republic, Russia. The population was 21 as of 2016. There is 1 street.

== Geography ==
Nizhny Kuyum is located in the valley of the Kuyum River, 26 km northeast of Chemal (the district's administrative centre) by road. Elekmonar is the nearest rural locality.
