= Verkh-Anos =

Verkh-Anos Верх-Анос
- Settlement
- Location within Altai Republic Location within Russia
- Coordinates: 51°26′N 85°49′E
- Country: Russia
- Region: Altai Republic
- District: Chemalsky District
- Time zone: UTC+7:00

Verkh-Anos (Russian: Верх-Анос; Altay: Ӱстӱги Онос, Üstügi Onos) is a rural locality (a settlement) in Anosinskoye Rural Settlement of Chemalsky District, the Altai Republic, Russia. The population was 27 as of 2016. There is 1 street.

== Geography ==
Verkh-Anos is located in the valley of the Katun River, 24 km northwest of Chemal (the district's administrative centre) by road. Anos is the nearest rural locality.
