= Chalchik Chunizhekov =

Altai writer and poet

Chalchik Anchinovich Chunizhekov (10 November 1898 in Nizhny Kuyum, Altai – 1973 in Gorno-Altaisk) was an Altai writer and poet and a collector of oral folk art.
