= Anos, Russia =

Anos Анос
- Village
- Location within Altai Republic Location within Russia
- Coordinates: 51°29′N 85°56′E
- Country: Russia
- Region: Altai Republic
- District: Chemalsky District
- Time zone: UTC+7:00

Anos (Russian: Анос; Altay: Онос, Onos) is a rural locality (a selo) and the administrative centre of Anosinskoye Rural Settlement of Chemalsky District, the Altai Republic, Russia. The population was 349 as of 2016. There are 10 streets.

== Geography ==
Anos is located in the valley of the Katun River, south from Gorno-Altaysk, 13 km north of Chemal (the district's administrative centre) by road. Uznezya is the nearest rural locality.
