= Administrative divisions of the Altai Republic =

Administrative districts of Russian federal subject

Altai Republic Russia
- Capital: Gorno-Altaysk

Administrative structure (as of 2011)
- Districts: 10
- Cities/towns: 1
- Urban-type settlements: 0
- Selsovets: 92

Municipal structure (as of 2002)
- Rural settlements: 243 (inhabited); 1 (uninhabited)

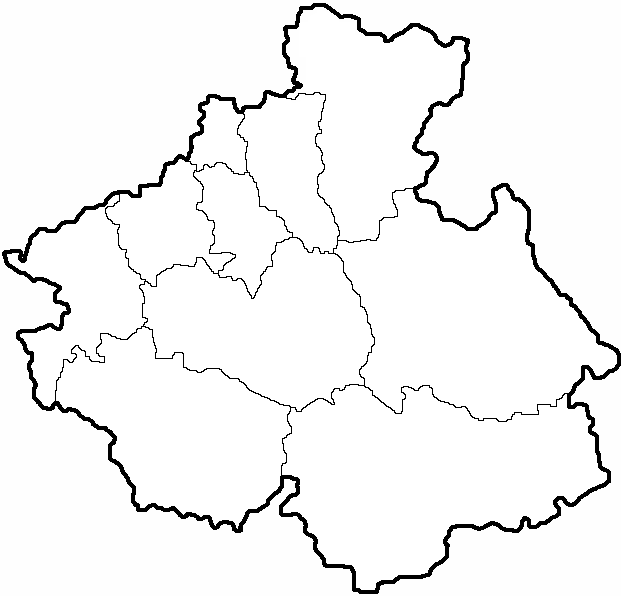
Map of the Altai Republic

Administrative, territorial, and municipal division of the Altai Republic is regulated by the Law #12-15 of the Altai Republic, passed by the State Assembly—El Kurultai on June 2, 1999, with subsequent amendments.

== Administrative and municipal divisions ==
The Law established the following classification:

- administrative units (административно-территориальные единицы)
  - district (район)—an administrative unit under jurisdiction of the Republic, governing a certain territory. Districts are governed from an administrative center.
  - selsovet (сельсовет)—a municipal unit under jurisdiction of a district comprising one or several settlements.
  - dyuchina (дючина)—national administrative unit for local self-governing of the native peoples. Dyuchinas would have the same administrative status as selsovets, but they have not been implemented in practice.
- inhabited localities (населённые пункты):
  - urban settlements (городские поселения):
    - city/town (город);
    - urban-type settlement (посёлок городского типа); not implemented in practice;
    - resort settlement (курортный посёлок); not implemented in practice;
    - suburban (dacha) settlement (дачный посёлок); not implemented in practice
  - rural settlements (сельские поселения)—settlements that do not satisfy the criteria for urban settlements:
    - selo (село);
    - settlement (посёлок);
    - village (деревня);
    - other types of rural settlements
  - closed settlement (закрытое административно-территориальное образование)—territories under the federal government management with travel and residency restrictions; usually military objects. Closed settlements have not been implemented in practice.

Changes in the overall administrative and territorial structure of the Republic are authorized by the State Assembly—El Kurultai. All changes must later be registered in the Russian Classification of Objects of Administrative Division on the federal level.

== Administrative and municipal divisions ==
Map

| Division | Structure | | OKATO | OKTMO | Rural (selsovet) |
| Division | Administrative | Municipal | OKATO | OKTMO | Rural (selsovet) |
|---|---|---|---|---|---|
| Gorno-Altaysk (Горно-Алтайск) | city | urban okrug | 84 401 | 84 701 | |
| Kosh-Agachsky (Кош-Агачский) | district | | 84 210 | 84 610 | 12 |
| Mayminsky (Майминский) | district | | 84 215 | 84 615 | 7 |
| Ongudaysky (Онгудайский) | district | | 84 220 | 84 620 | 10 |
| Turochaksky (Турочакский) | district | | 84 225 | 84 625 | 9 |
| Ulagansky (Улаганский) | district | | 84 230 | 84 630 | 7 |
| Ust-Kansky (Усть-Канский) | district | | 84 235 | 84 635 | 11 |
| Ust-Koksinsky (Усть-Коксинский) | district | | 84 240 | 84 640 | 9 |
| Chemalsky (Чемальский) | district | | 84 243 | 84 643 | 7 |
| Choysky (Чойский) | district | | 84 245 | 84 645 | 7 |
| Shebalinsky (Шебалинский) | district | | 84 250 | 84 650 | 13 |
