= Burkhanism =

Indigenous religious movement of the Altai people

Burkhanism Ak Jang
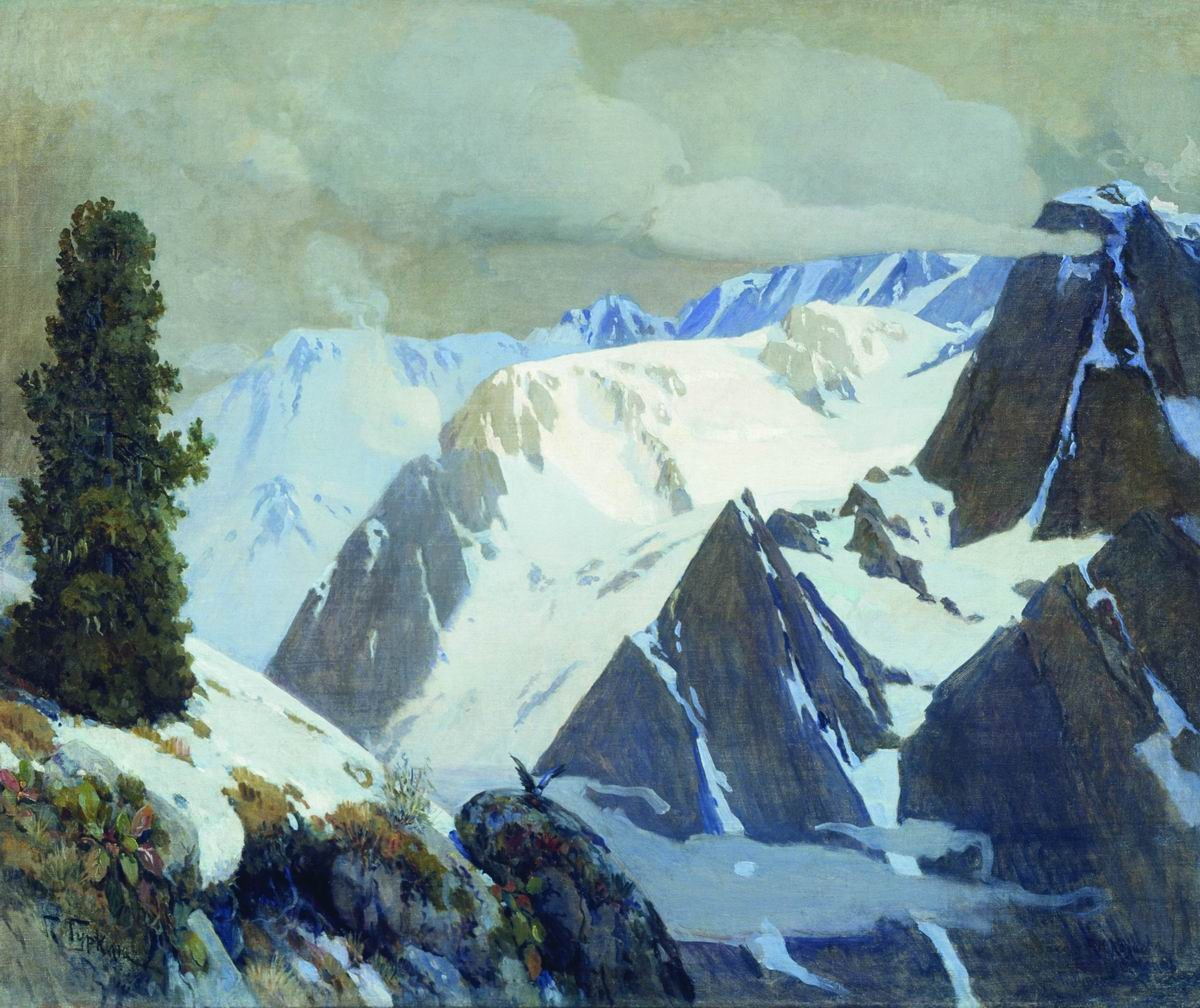
- Khan-Altai (1912) by Grigory Gurkin

Total population
- up to 81% of Altai

Founder
- Chet Chelpan • Chugul Sarok Chandyk

Regions with significant populations
- Altai Republic

Religions
- Ethnic religion • Tengrism

Languages
- Altai

Related ethnic groups
- Altaians

Burkhanism, known endonymically as Ak Jang (Altay: Ак јаҥ [ɑq t͡ɕɑɴ]; lit. 'White Faith'), is an indigenist new religious movement that flourished among the Altai people of Russia's Altai Republic between 1904 and the 1930s. The Russian Empire was suspicious of the movement's potential to stir up native unrest and perhaps involve outside powers.

Originally millenarian, charismatic and anti-shamanic, the Burkhanist movement gradually lost most of these qualities—becoming increasingly routine, institutionalized (around a hierarchy of oral epic singers) and accommodating itself to the pre-existing Altaian folk religion. It exists today in several revival forms.

On the whole, the Burkhanist movement was shown to be a syncretistic phenomenon combining elements of ancient pre-shamanist, shamanist, Tibetan Buddhist and Eastern Orthodox Christian beliefs. According to a professor of Tomsk State University Liudmila Sherstova, it emerged in response to the needs of a new people—the Altai-kizhi or Altaians who sought to distinguish themselves from the neighboring and related tribes and for whom Burkhanism became a religious form of their ethnic identity.

== Origins of the name ==
Burkhanism is the usual English-language scholarly name, which has its origin in the Russian academic usage. One of the Burkhanist deities is Ak-Burkhan, or "White Burkhan". Burkhan is the Turkified version of the name Buddha —derived from Middle Chinese 佛 (MC bjut, “Buddha”) and Old Turkic 𐰴𐰣 (qan, “ruler, king”)— yet Burkhanism is not considered Buddhist, as the term is also used in shamanistic nomenclature. For example, in Mongolian shamanism, the name of the most sacred mountain, the rumored birthplace and final resting spot of Genghis Khan, is also Burkhan Khaldun. Ak-Burkhan is only one of a pantheon of deities worshiped by Burkhanists (see list below), but Ak-Burkhan nevertheless provides the name of the religion in Russian, and hence into other languages.

The Altaian name for the religion is Ak Jang "the White Faith". "White" refers to its emphasis on the upper world in the three-world cosmology of Tengrism. Alternatively, the name may also allude to Ak Jang's rejection of animal sacrifices in favor of offerings of horse milk or horse-milk alcohol. Jang means authority; faith; custom; law or principle; and canon or rules of ensemble. In more colloquial settings, the term may also be used as a "way of doing things" and is used in reference to religions as well as political systems.

== Early history ==
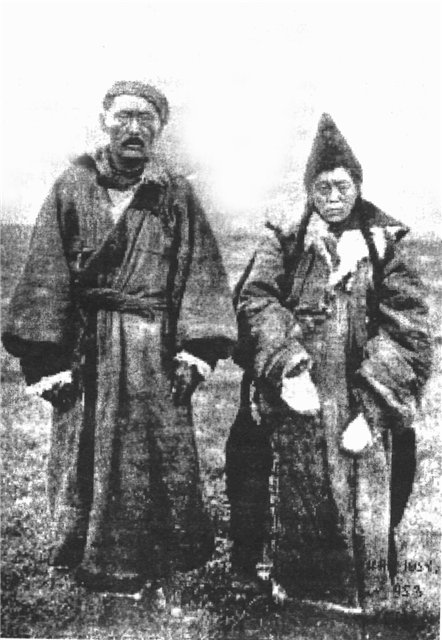
Chet Chelpan and his wife Kul

In April 1904 Chet Chelpan (or, Chot Chelpanov) and his adopted daughter Chugul Sarok Chandyk reported visions of a rider dressed in white, and riding a white horse. This figure, whom they called Ak-Burkhan ("White Burkhan"), announced the imminent arrival of the mythical messianic hero Oirat Khan who was actually a real historical figure—Khoit-Oirat prince Amursana. The central figure in the research of Burkhanism in the past forty years, however, has demonstrated that Oirot-khan is a mythologized image of the Dzungar past of the people of Altai-kizhi. Chet and Chugul gathered thousands of Altaians for prayer meetings, initially in the Tereng Valley. These were violently suppressed by mobs of Russians, instigated by the Altaian Spiritual Mission, who were afraid of the potential of the competing religion to decrease the Orthodox Christian flock in Altai. Chet and Chugul were arrested, Chugul was released, and after a prolonged trial Chet was fully exonerated by court and released in 1906.

Researcher Andrei A. Znamenski compares the Burkanist movement to other indigenous revitalizing movements around the world, such as the Native American Ghost Dance or the Melanesian Cargo Cult. An exhaustively detailed treatment of the comparisons and comparability of Burkhanism with the Melanesian Cargo Cult, the Mennonites, the Dukhobors of Georgia, the Mariitsy of Nizhnii Novgorod, and many other movements, is provided in Sherstova's dissertation from the 1980s.

Znamenski says, the prime motivating factor was Altaians' fear of displacement by Russian colonists, Russification, and subjection to taxation and conscription on the same basis as Russian peasants.

Andrei Vinogradov (thesis linked below) sees Burkhanism as a typical nomadic mobilization pattern—aiming to link families and clans (seok) into a steppe empire (which in this case never materialized). The Burkhanists' veneration of heroes from oral epics, he says, serves much the same cultural centralizing function as the veneration of other divine heroes such as Gesar, Manas, or Genghis Khan. As such it constitutes a major aspect of Tengrism, distinct from shamanism.

After the arrest of Chet and Chugul, Tyryi Akemchi arose to become the most prominent iarlikchi, and helped organize the movement. Having been exposed to Buddhism through his years as a translator in Mongolia, Tyryi added a number of Buddhist trappings to Burkhanist ritual, such as bells. Within a decade, most of the Altaian population had joined the new faith.

In 1918 Gregorii Choros-Gurkin and other Altaian leaders declared the formation of something called the "Karakorum-Altaian Regional Government" (Karakorum-Altaiskaia Okruzhnaia Uprava), with the object of establishing an "Karakorum-Altai Republic". This was intended to include not only Altai but also neighboring republics of Tuva and Khakassia. It was forcibly dissolved with arrival of Bolshevik power in 1922.

== Deities ==
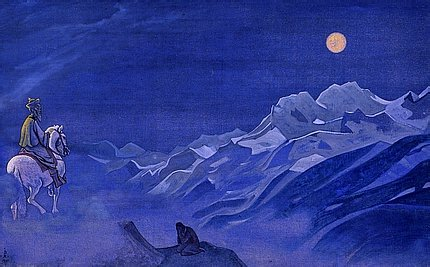
Oirat – Messenger of the White Burkhan by Nicholas Roerich

Burkhanism accepts the "three worlds" of Tengrism. (These are the upper, middle, and lower worlds—in other words heaven, earth, and the underworld.) However, it rejects worship of traditional deities associated with the underworld. In addition, it imports into worship many figures from Altaian oral epic lore, which were not worshipped in the "shamanic" part of the Altaian religion.

Uch Kurbustan—"Uch" means "three", while "Kurbustan" comes from the Soghdian "Khormazta" (and thence from the Avestan "Ahura Mazda"). Thus, a triune God. Though imported from oral epics, Uch Kurbustan is a generalized spirit rather than a hero of stories with a personality. He may be analogous with the High God Tengri ("Heaven").

Rather than an import from Buddhism, Christianity, or Islam, this particular trinity is likely to have been inspired by other triune gods and heroes from Altai culture (sometimes in the form of a god with three sons). Uch Kurbustan is connected with the following three messianic heroes, also from Altaian oral epic lore:

Oirat or Galden-Oirat—mythological ancestor of the Western Mongols. A conflation / dim historical memory of a number of real-life Western Mongolian leaders from around the seventeenth century including Galdan Tseren.

Amursana—a legendary Khoit-Oirat chieftain who fled Chinese territory for Russian after the 1756 Qing destruction of Dzungaria.

Shunu ("Wolf")—the Altaian version of Asena, the totemic lupine eponymous ancestor.

The gods of the upper world, or aru tos ("pure ancestors"), are considered fragments or emanations of Uch Kurbustan. Burkhanism calls these Burkhans. Among them are:

Ak-Burkhan ("White Burkhan")—depicted as an old man with white hair, a white coat, and white headgear, who rides a white horse. Possibly analogous to the Mongolian "white old man", Tsagan Ebugen. A symbol of good fortune.

Jajyk—a formless spirit-mediator, assists with human-divine communication. Vinogradov compares with the Holy Spirit. Altaians distinguished between an Ak-Jajyk ("White Jajyk") who carried messages to the gods of the upper world, and a Sary-Jajyk ("Yellow Jajyk") who did the same for gods of the middle world, and is identified with the hearth.

Umai—the goddess of childbirth and children. In other myths the consort of the High God Tengri, and thus a primordial mother figure.

Ot-ene, the "Mother of Fire"—worshipped before every sacrifice, but especially during one of the three major Burkhanist festivals

Gods of the "middle world"—i.e. the familiar spheres of nature and human affairs—include numerous local spirits, such as spirits associated with mountains (taika-eezi) or springs (arzhans), or "masters of the game". They may also be associated with particular clans (seok). More generalized ones include:

Altai-eezi, the "Master of Altai"—a sort of genius loci, suitably adapted for an Altaian national consciousness.

Ul'gan—a spiritual ancestor of several Altaian clans. Originally a proper name, now generalized. Some sources describe Ul'gan as the creator of the universe in Burkhanist theology; this is probably a misunderstanding.

Historically, Burkhanism rejected the traditional gods of the underworld, notably Erlik (Yerlik), its chief. This rejection is closely related to Burkhanism's rejection of Altaian shamanism, and corresponding elevation of oral epic singers (yarlikchi). (By "shaman" is here meant manjaktu kams, i.e. the "costume-wearing" specialists who communicate with the underworld gods.) Both rejections are likely to have been inspired by oral epic lore, which regularly features shamans as villains.

== Practices ==
- Burning juniper (archyn) for blessing, purification, or healing
- Home or hilltop altars (kure or murgul), with candles and milk-offerings
- Erecting of cairns (oboo)
- Recitation / composition / patronage of oral epics
- Divination and weather-control
- Display of white and yellow ribbons or streamers (from trees or strings, or dangling from the back of one's headgear)
- Prayer while standing, with hands raised; or with prostrations
- Celebration of festivals:
  - Shuten or Murgul—a semiannual (spring and fall) festival dedicated to Uch Kurbustan
  - Chok or Jajyk Choktor—a fall festival dedicated to jajyks
  - Ot Takyr—dedicated to Ot-Ene

Some sources speak of a list of "Twenty Commandments" for Burkhanism. The evidence for this is sparse. Alcohol and tobacco were proscribed in the early years.

Chugul came to be venerated as the main recipient of the original message. This was much less true of Chet, although both were addressed with honorific titles.

== Burkhanism today ==
Russian painter Nicholas Roerich and his wife Helena Roerich passed through Altai in 1926. Nicholas painted Oirat—Messenger of the White Burkhan based on his understanding of the movement. (Note that the painting's title apparently gets the theology backward—it was rather White Burkhan who was the messenger for Oirat.) Followers of Agni Yoga, an esoteric movement founded by the Roerichs, have encouraged a recent revival of interest in Burkhanism among non-Altaians. At the same time they have insisted on a link with Tibetan Buddhism and a veneration of Mount Belukha, elements not found in traditional Burkhanism.

A number of Burkhanist revival organizations emerged during the 1990s, mostly as attempts to formulate or preserve an Altaian ethno-nationalist identity. To that end many of them have been persuaded to reconsider earlier Burkhanism's vexed relationship with shamanism and/or Buddhism.

According to recent statistical studies, up to 70% or 81% (data of the Research State Institute of Altaic Studies) of the Altaians continue to profess the so-called "Altai Faith"—Burkhanism, shamanism and other folk spiritual cults and traditions.

== List of movements ==
- Altai Faith (Altay: Алтай Jаҥ)
  - Sacral Altai public ecological organization (Russian: Общественная экологическая организация "Сакральный Алтай") (2016)
- Altai Faith White Faith (Altay: Алтай Jаҥ Ак Jаҥ (Jаҥы Алтай)) (2004)
- Soul Ecology School "Tengri" (Russian: Школа экологии души "Тенгри") (1995)
- Spiritual and Health center "Ak Sanaa" (Russian: Духовно-оздоровительный центр "Ак Санаа")
- Spiritual center of the Turks "Kin Altai" (Russian: Духовный центр тюрков "Кин Алтай") (2005)
- Tengrism—Heavenly Faith (Russian: Тенгрианство — Небесная Вера) (2010)
- Buddhist communion—Ak Burkhan (1991)

== Notable Burkhanists ==
- Grigory Gurkin, a Soviet landscape artist and chairman of the Karakorum-Altaian Regional Government;
- Paslei Samyk (1938–2020), a poet and translator.

== Sources ==
=== Secondary sources ===
in English

- Filatov, Sergei (2001). "Altai Burkhanism Faith or a Dream of Faith?". Anthropology & Archeology of Eurasia. 39 (4): 76–91. doi:10.2753/AAE1061-1959390476. S2CID 161965566.
- Halemba, Agnieszka (2003). "Contemporary religious life in the Republic of Altai: the interaction of Buddhism and Shamanism" (PDF). Sibirica. 3 (2): 165–82. doi:10.1080/1361736042000245295. Archived from the original (PDF) on 2005-05-10.
- Johnson, David. What Was and Is Burkhanism?
- Vinogradov, Andrei. Ak Jang in the Context of Altai Religious Tradition
- Znamenski, Andrei (2005). "Power of Myth: Popular ethnonationalism and Nationality Building in Mountain Altai, 1904–1922" (PDF). Acta Slavica Iaponica. 22: 44–47. Archived from the original (PDF) on 2019-08-02.
- Znamenski, Andrei A. (2014). "Power for the Powerless: Oirot/Amursana Prophecy in Altai and Western Mongolia, 1890s–1920s". Millénarismes et innovation rituelle en Asie du Nord. 45 (45). doi:10.4000/emscat.2444.

in Russian

- Bourdeaux, Michael; Filatov, Sergei, eds. (2006). Современная религиозная жизнь России. Опыт систематического описания [Contemporary Religious Life of Russia. Systematic description experience] (in Russian). Vol. 4. Keston Institute. Москва: Логос. ISBN 5-98704-057-4.
- Khvastunova, Julia V. (2018). "Современное тенгрианство (на примере версии тенгрианства В. А. Сата в Республике Алтай)" [Modern Tengriism (as in V. A. Sat's Version of Tengriism in the Altai Republic]. Colloquium Heptaploremes (in Russian) (5): 33–43.
- Knorre, Boris K. (2016). "Современный алтайский шаманизм в контексте национальной религиозной политики Республики Алтай" [Contemporary Altai Shamanism in the Context of the National Religious Policy of the Altai Republic]. Вестник РГГУ. Сер. Литературоведение. Языкознание. Культурология (in Russian). 12 (21): 89–114.
- Sherstova, Lyudmila (2010). Бурханизм: истоки религии и этноса [Burkhanism: sources of religion and nation], Tomsk State University Press. (a reproduction of Sherstova's dissertation from 1986, which was a result of the author's ethnographic expeditions to Altai in 1976-1985).
- Sherstova, Lyudmila (1997). Тайна долины Теренг [The secret of the Tereng Valley]. Gorno-Altaysk.

=== Primary sources ===
- Butanayev, Victor Y. (2003). Бурханизм тюрков Саяно-Алтая [Burkhanism of the Turks of Sayano-Altai] (in Russian). Абакан: Изд-во Хакасского государственного университета им. Н. Ф. Катанова. ISBN 5-7810-0226-X. Archived from the original on 2014-06-26.
- Shodoev, Nikolai A. (2010). Основы алтайской философии [Fundamentals of the Altaian Philosophy] (in Russian). Бийск.
- Tyrysova, Zinaida T. (2008). Ургÿлjикти учугы — Алтай Jаҥ (Нить вечности — Алтай Jан) [Thread of Eternity—Altai Jang] (in Southern Altai). Горно-Алтайск.
