= Castro de Borneiro =

Coordinates: 43°11′41″N 8°57′10″W

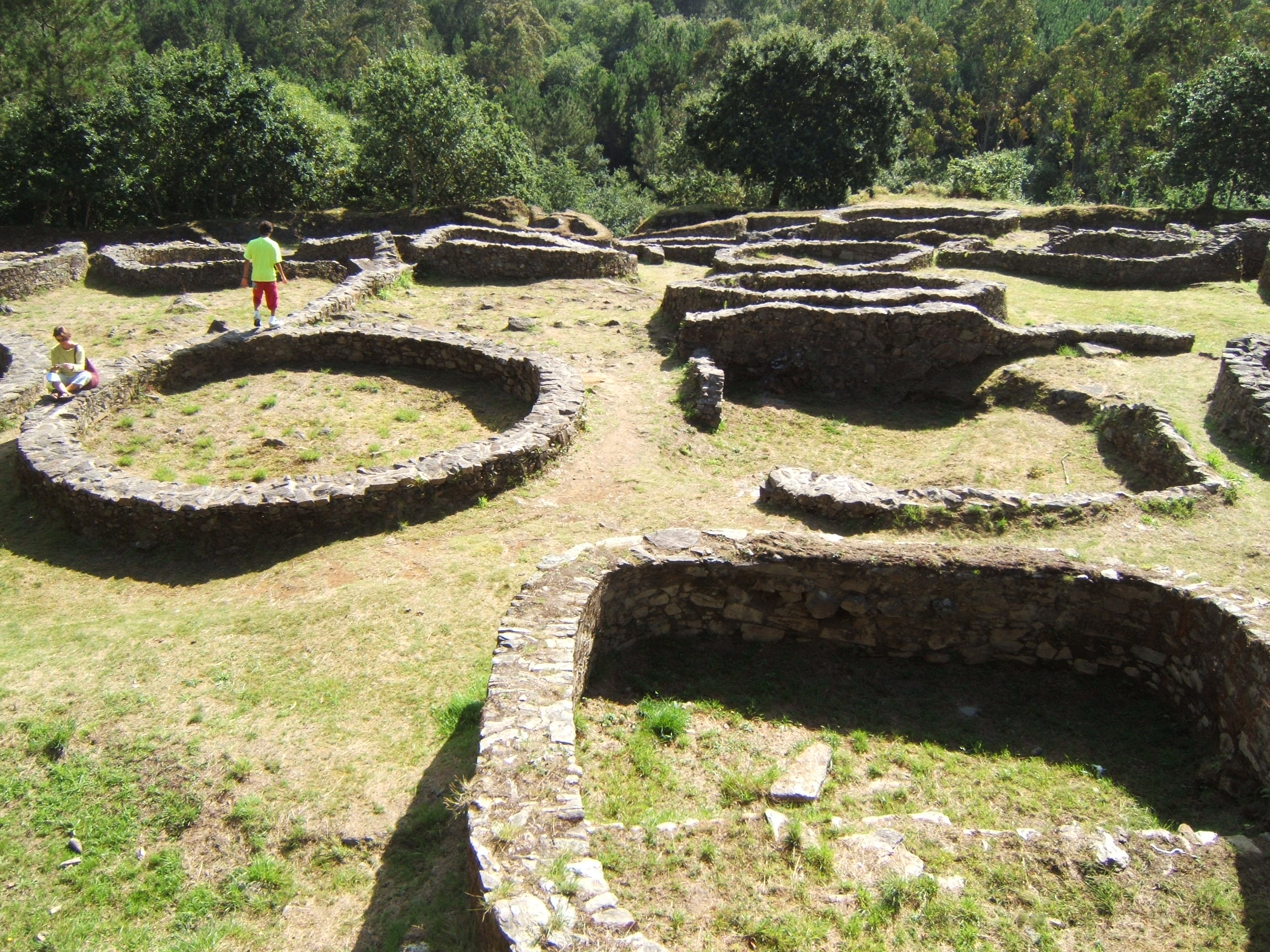
Vista del Castro de Borneiro

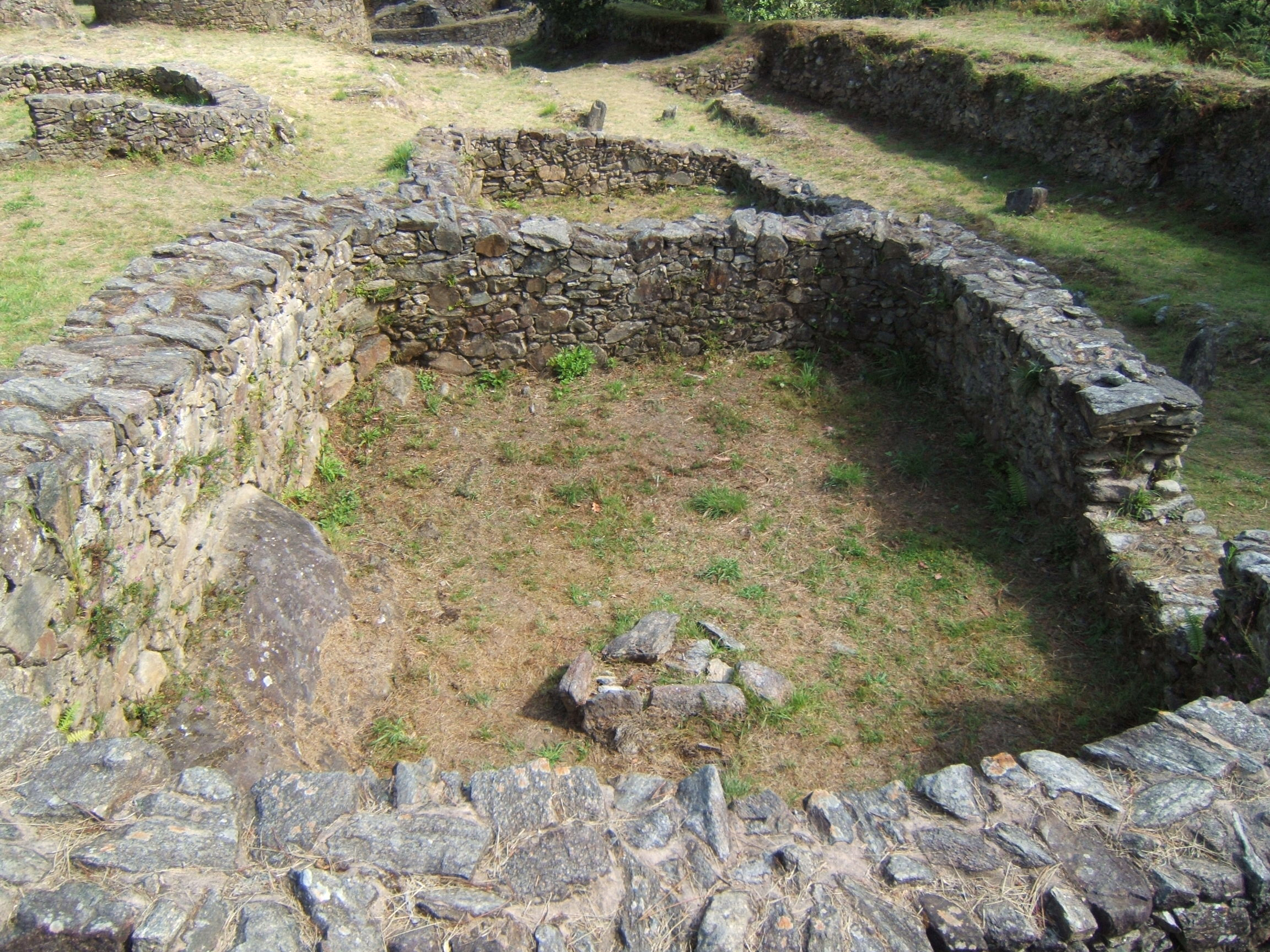
Castro de Borneiro.

Castro de Borneiro is an archeological site in Galicia, Spain. A castro is an iron-age walled settlement, or oppidum, and the site is an example of remnants of the Castro culture in Northern Spain which dates as far back as the 9th century BCE, though this site was inhabited from the 4th to the 1st century BCE. It is a textbook example from that period, and has been the focus of several excavations and alterations to accommodate visitors.

== Location ==
Castro de Borneiro is located in Castro (A Cibdá), which belongs to the parish of Borneiro, in the municipality of Cabana de Bergantiños (La Coruña). It is 500 meters from the AC-430, the road between Ponteceso and Baio.

== Description ==
The castro, which is located at an altitude of 200 m on an east-facing slope near a stream, was the first Galician castro to have been scientifically dated, using Carbon-14 dating. No signs of Romanization have been found at the site.

After being discovered in 1924 by Isidro Parga Pondal and Pérez Bustamante, excavations began in the 1930s, led by Sebastián García-Paz, and were resumed by Jorge Juan Eiroa in the 1970s. More thorough work was carried out in the 1980s at the hand of Ana Romero Masià (1952-). Multiple fragments of autochthonous ceramics, bronze and iron vases, stone walls, melting casts, glass bead, etc. were found at the site. The objects are currently exhibited in the Archeological and Historical Museum of La Coruña. To date, a total of 36 structures have been excavated, about three quarters of the total.

A first collection of structures, which is 90 by 55 meters, is surrounded by a moat and two defensive walls, except on the east side, where the abrupt slope of the hillside serves as a natural defense.

In addition to the main enclosure, there is an area known as the extra-mural district, which coincides with the entrance to the castro. This second collection consists of a great oblong dwelling, two fountains with drains and a circular oven, which, during its time, must have been covered by a dome. The dwellings are circular or rectangular with rounded corners, and stand out in comparison with those of other sites because of their great size.

Dolmen de Dombate is located a few kilometers from the site.

== See also ==
- Castro Culture
- Oppidum
- Castros in Spain
- The Lighthouse Way
