= Grigory Gurkin =

Russian painter (1870–1937)

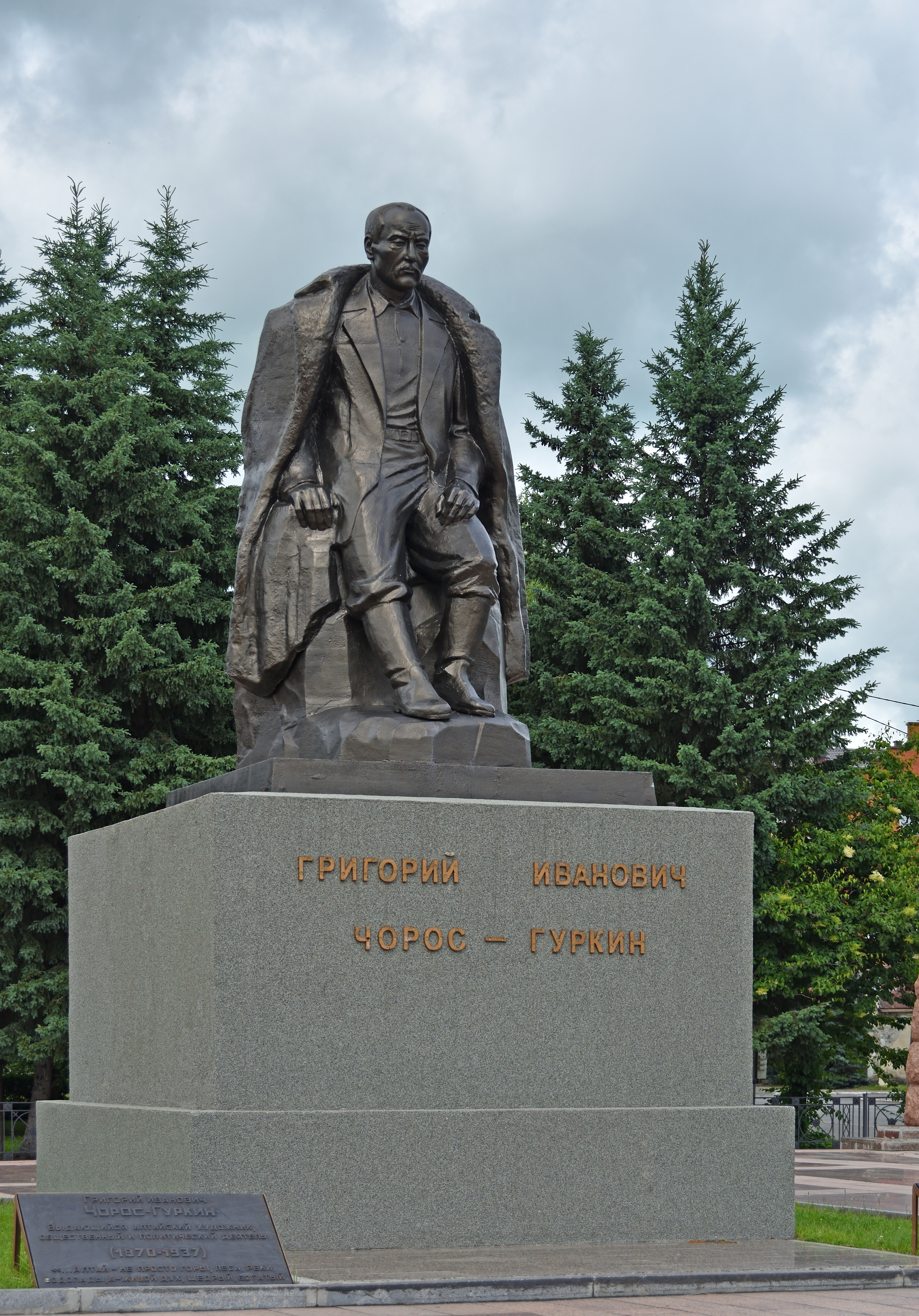
- Monument to Choros Gurkin, Gorno-Altaysk
- Born: 12 January 1870; Ulala, Russian Empire
- Died: 11 October 1937 (aged 67); Soviet Union
- Known for: Painting
- Movement: Realism, Symbolism

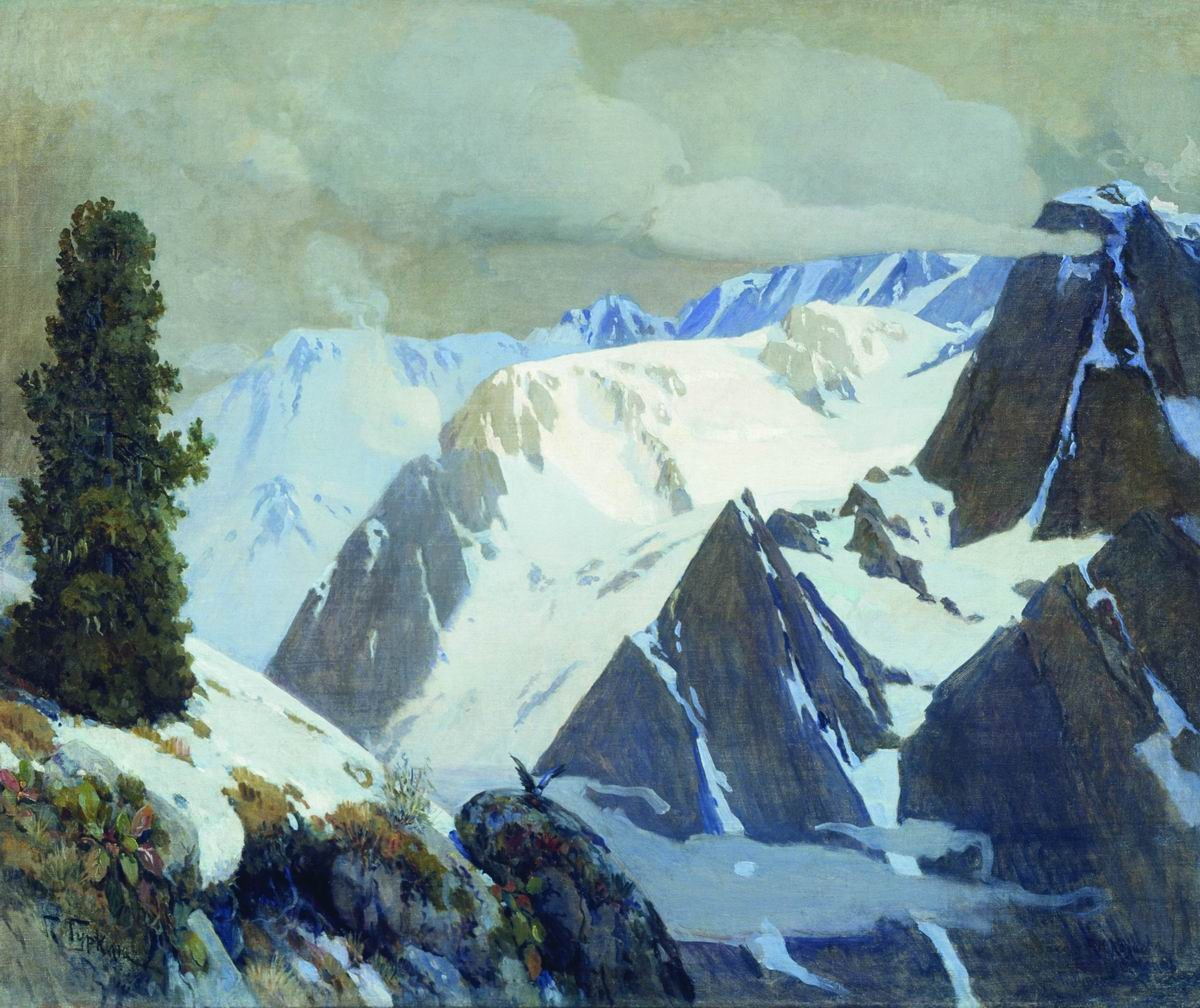
Khan-Altai (1912)

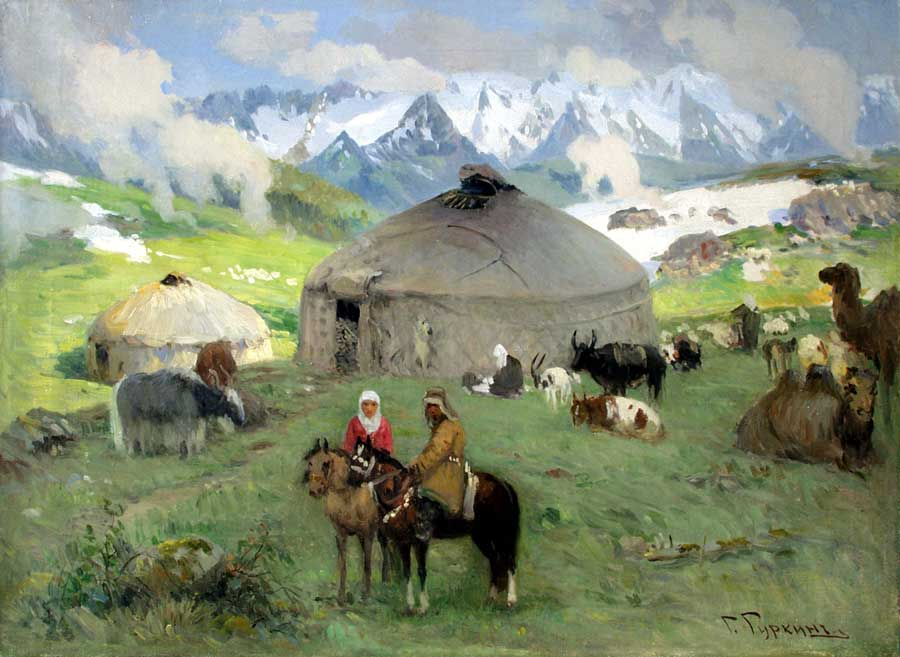
Nomads in the Mountains

Grigory Ivanovich Gurkin (Russian: Григо́рий Ива́нович Гу́ркин; 24 January 1870 – 11 October 1937) was a Russian landscape painter, the first professional artist of Altai ethnic origin. He is notable for his Altai mountain landscapes.

== Biography ==
Gurkin was born in 1870 in the selo of Ulala, currently Gorno-Altaysk. He was ethnic Altaian from the family of Choros (his name is sometimes indicated as Choros-Gurkin). In 1878 he was sent to the icon-painting school in Ulala, and eventually he became a professional icon-painter. Subsequently, he became a supporter of the Altai religion Burkhanism. He worked in Ulala and Biysk. In 1897, he started his studies in the Imperial Academy of Arts in Saint Petersburg with Ivan Shishkin and Alexander Kiselyov.

In 1903, Gurkin returned to Altai and started to work as a teacher in the selo of Anos, travelling every summer to remote regions of Altai Mountains. The closest city with the developed art scene was Tomsk, where Gurkin participated in art exhibitions. He was the member of Tomsk Society of Art Lovers (the main Tomsk art scene society) since 1909.

In February 1918, after the October Revolution, representatives of Altay tribes in Ulala decided to establish the Karakorum Government, which had the purpose of uniting all Altay lands into a national state. Gurkin became the chairman of the government. In 1919, the government was dismissed by the forces loyal to Alexander Kolchak, and Gurkin escaped to Mongolia, where he lived for a year. In 1921, with the help of the Red Partisans, led by their commander Sergey Kochetov, he moved to the independent Tuva. There he continued to depict the everyday life and traditions of the locals, including the shamanism.

In 1925, Gurkin returned to the Soviet Union. In the 1920s and 1930s, he was involved in education, in particular, he created illustrations to Altay epic poems and to primary school books. In 1937, during the Great Purge, Grigory Gurkin was arrested and subsequently executed.
