= Anos, Spain =

Anos Anos, San Esteban, Santo Estevo de Anos
- Village
- Anos Anos (Europe)
- Coordinates: 43.168389°N 8.913444°W
- Country: Spain

Population (2019)
  - Total: 299

Anos, also known by the longer names of Santo Estevo de Anos (Galician) and San Estaban de Anos (Spanish) is a village in Spain. It is a parish of the municipality of Cabana de Bergantiños, in the autonomous community of Galicia in northwestern Spain. In 2019, it had a population of 299. It is also home to a number of places of interest. The Igrexa de Santo Estevo de Anos church is located in an area of Anos called O cruceiro.
