= Cabana de Bergantiños =

Municipality in A Coruña, Spain

Coordinates: 43°13′9″N 8°58′48″W

- Municipality
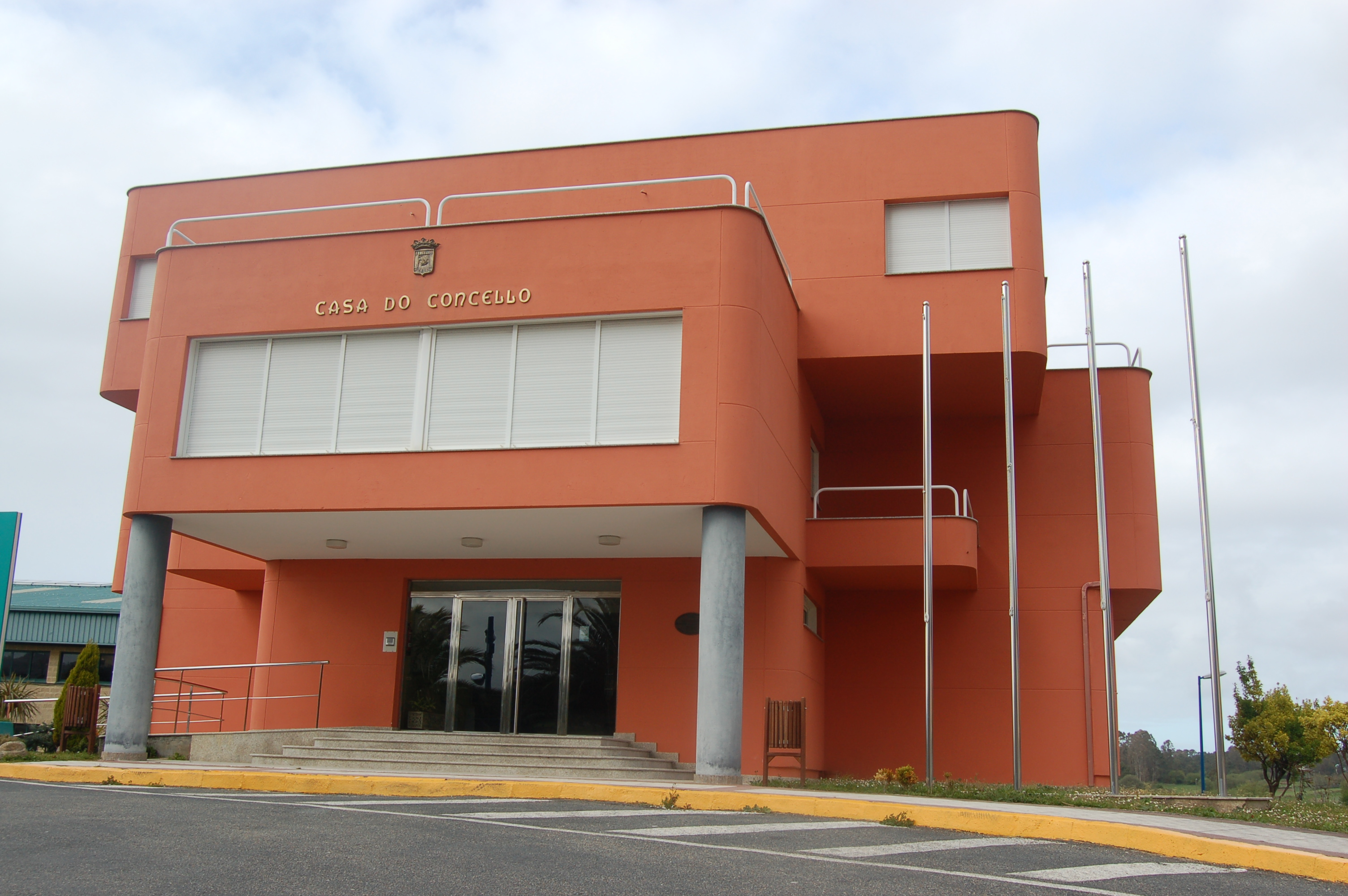
- Cabana de Bergantiños town hall

- Coat of arms
- Nickname: Bergantiños
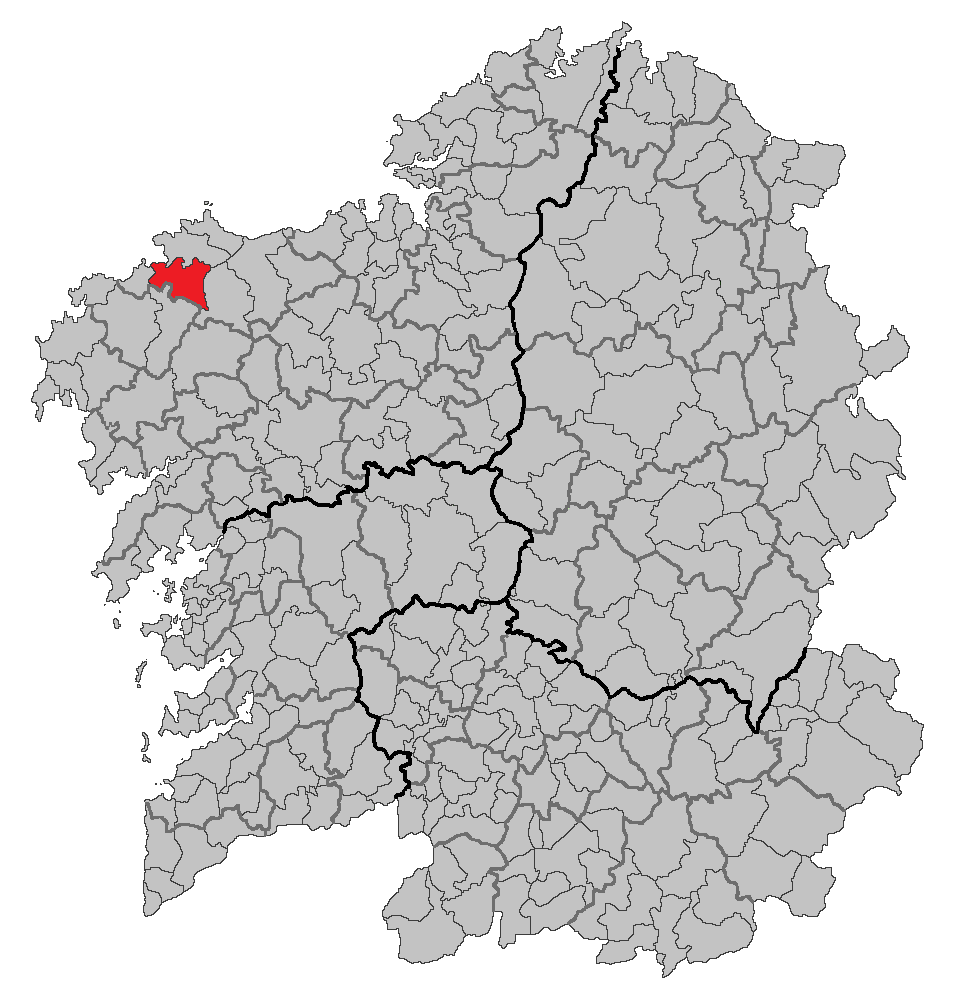
- Location of Cabana de Bergantiños within Galicia
- Country: Spain
- Autonomous community: Galicia
- Province: A Coruña

Population (2025-01-01)
  - Total: 4,067
- Time zone: UTC+1 (CET)
  - Summer (DST): UTC+2 (CEST)

Cabana de Bergantiños or Cabana is a municipality in the Province of A Coruña, in the autonomous community of Galicia in northwestern Spain. It used to be known as Cesullas.

== Main sights ==
- Castro de Borneiro: an Iron Age hillfort.
- Dolmen of Dombate: a dolmen of the Neolithic.
- Torre da Penela: tower of an ancient castle.
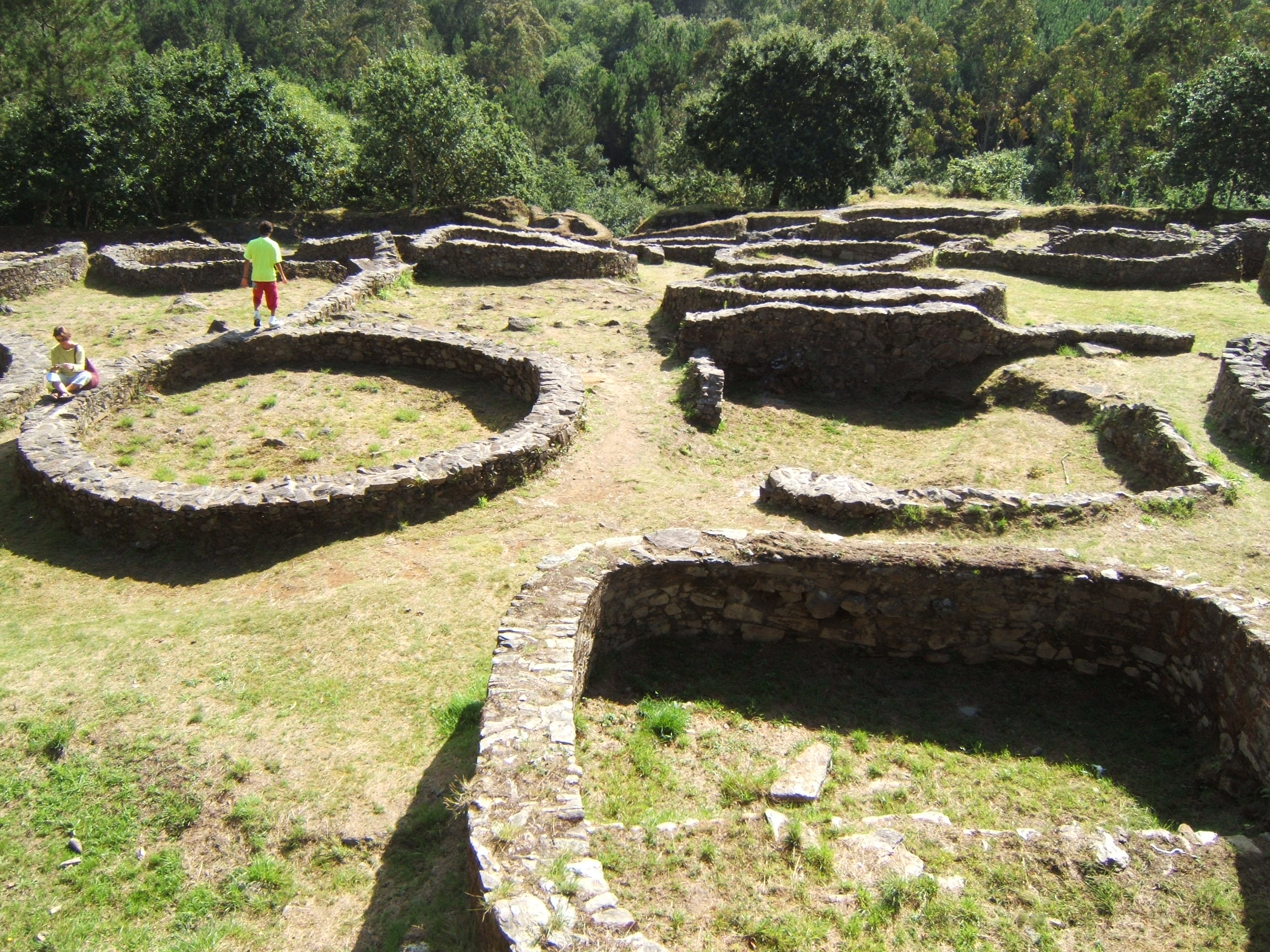
Castro de Borneiro

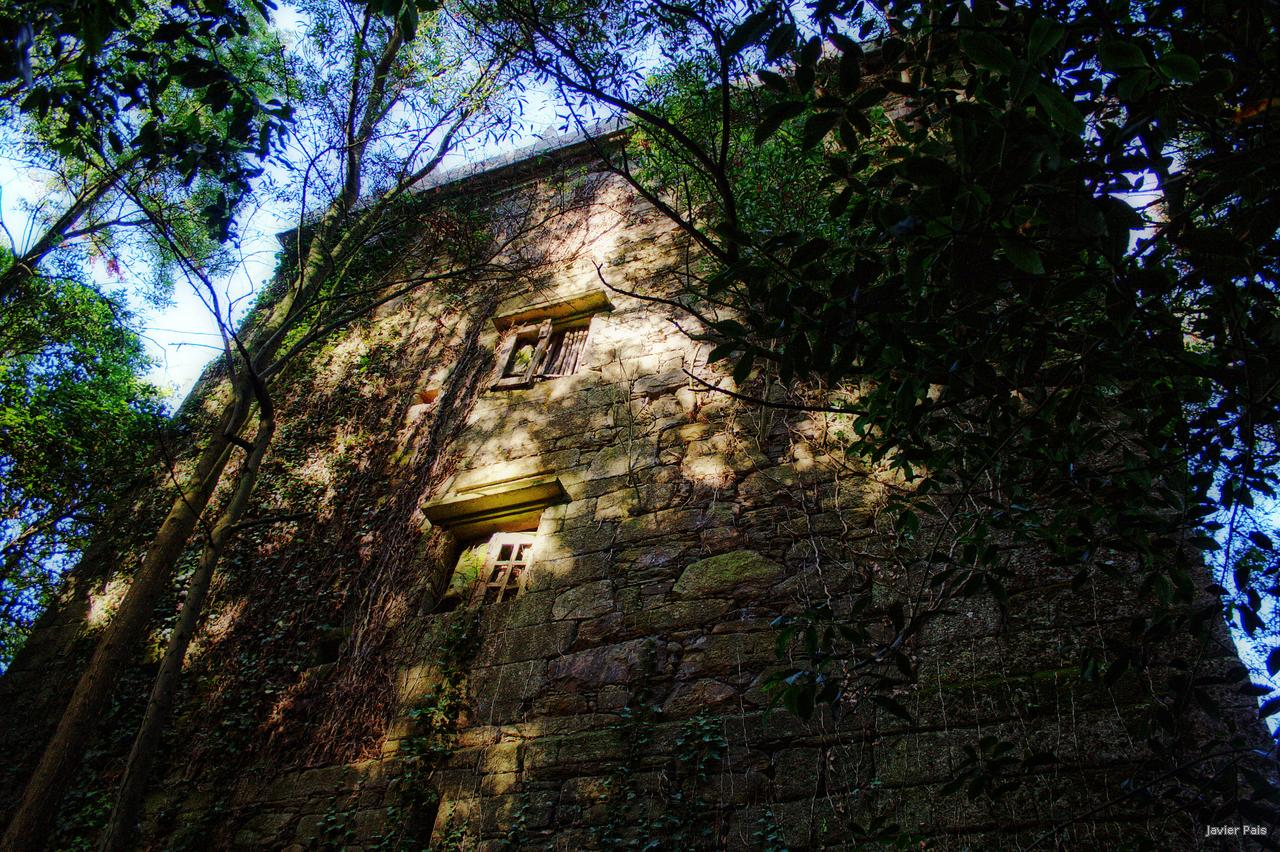
Torre da Penela

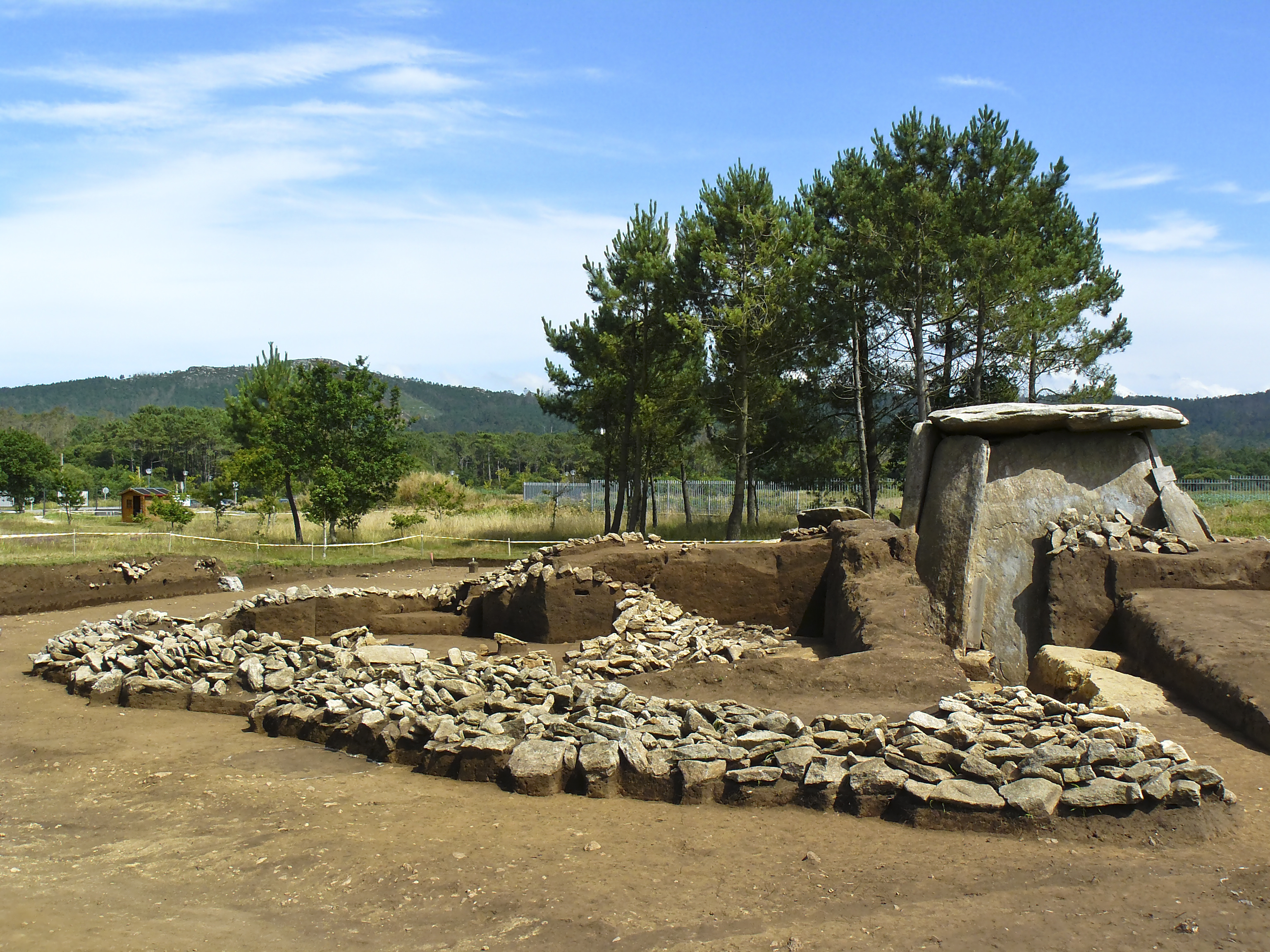
The dolmen of Dombate during an archeological excavation

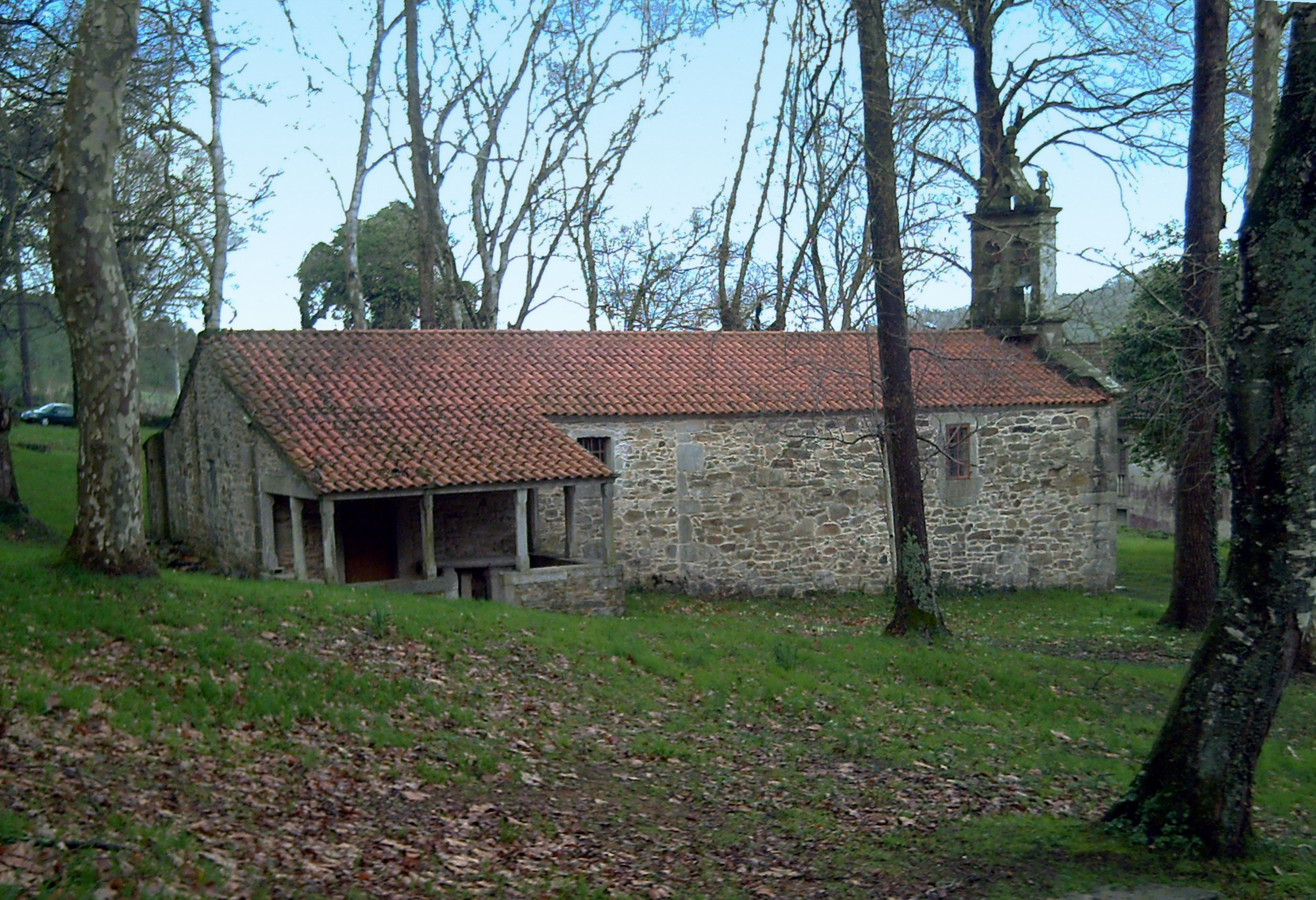
San Fins chapel

== Demography ==
From: INE Archiv

== See also ==
- The Lighthouse Way
- List of municipalities in A Coruña
