= Karakorum Government =

1918–1922 independent state

Confederated Republic of Altai
- 1918–1922
- Flag (until 1921)

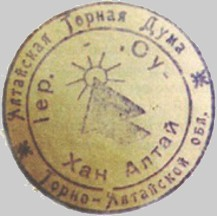
- seal of the Governor General of Karakorum

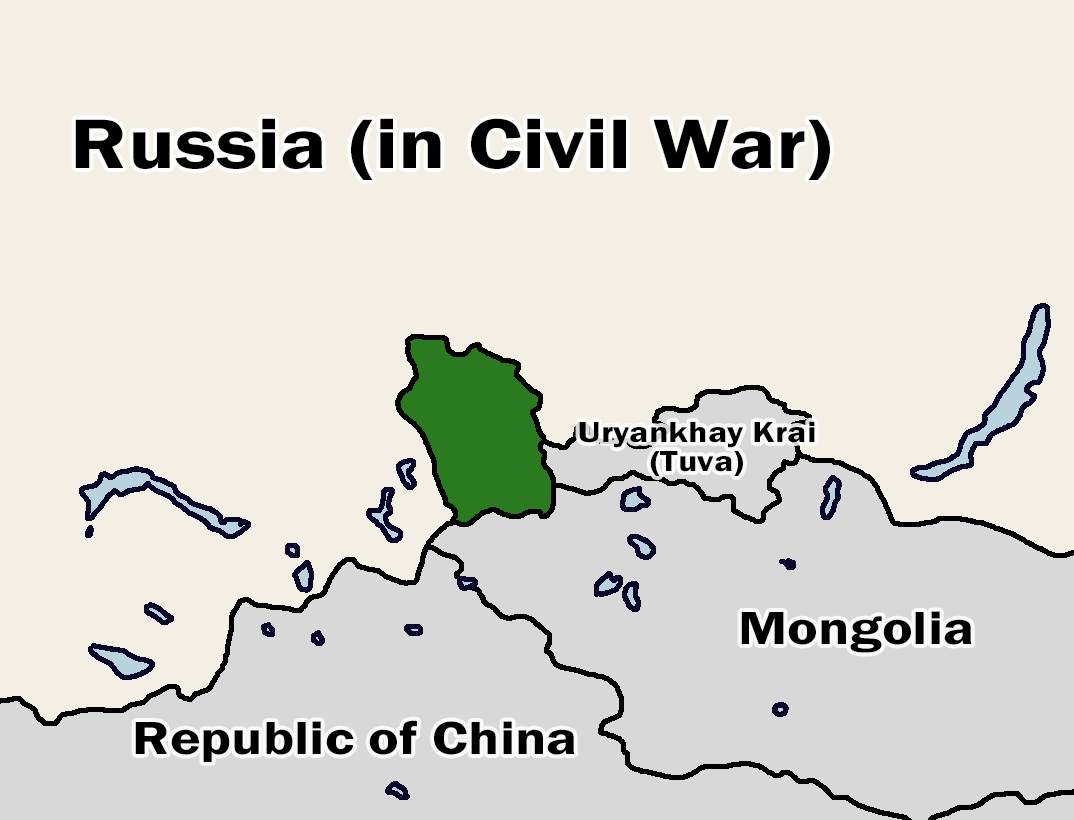
- The territory of the Karakorum Government
- Capital: Ulala
- Demonym: Altaian

Government
  - Chairman of the Karakorum-Altay: Grigory Gurkin
  - Head of the Constituent Congress of the High Altai: Vasily Anuchin
- History
  - Established: March 1918
  - Disestablished: April 1922
Preceded by	Succeeded by
Russian Republic	Russian Socialist Federative Soviet Republic; Oirot Autonomous Oblast
- Today part of: Altai
- 1. This country is also known as the Confederated Republic of Altai and the Karakorum-Altai Region

The Karakorum Government or Confederated Republic of Altai was a republic created as an attempt to create an independent Altai. It lasted from 1918 to 1922, when it was annexed by the Russian Soviet Federative Socialist Republic.

== Background ==
The areas of southern Siberia (today's Altai, Tuva, Khakassia, and neighboring areas) which were conquered by the Russian Tsardom in the 18th century (except Tuva, which was part of Mongolia under Qing rule until it became a protectorate of Russia in 1914), comprised diverse Siberian-Turkic peoples, which, by the 1910s were approximately 50% of the population of the area. They rejected Russian rule and (in general but not fully) opposed Orthodox Christianity. By the 1900s, a new religious movement rose up, Burkhanism, emerged in response to the needs of a new people—the Altai-kizhi, or Altaians, who sought to distinguish themselves from the neighboring and related tribes and for whom Burkhanism became a religious form of their ethnic identity.

Thousands of Altaians gathered for prayer meetings, initially in the Tereng Valley. These were violently suppressed by mobs of Russians, instigated by the Altaian Spiritual Mission, who were afraid of the potential of the competing religion to decrease the Orthodox Christian flock in Altai. The prime motivating factor for the adoption of this new faith was Altaians' fear of displacement by Russian colonists, Russification, and subjection to taxation and conscription on the same basis as Russian peasants. This movement and the opposition to Russification created a common sense of nationality and desire for self determination, which was to be fulfilled in the chaos of the Russian Civil War.

== History ==
The second Congress of the high Altai was called in March 1918 and officially created the Confederated Republic of Altai. The pro-Burkhanist government was founded by Altai painter Grigoriy Gurkin and by Russian writer and publicist Vasily Anuchin. Officially, the republic was not a fully independent entity, but rather an administrative entity with some autonomy. In practice, it was relatively independent due to the chaos of the Russian Civil War. This was intended to include not only Altai but also neighboring republics of Tuva and Khakassia, and declared as the first step to rebuilding the 17th century Oirat state (at least including the Turkic-speaking peoples that had been its subjects). The republic was eventually invaded by white forces in the civil war, then by the Soviet 5th Army and destroyed in April 1920, although resistance continued well into 1922.
