= Ust-Kan, Altai Republic =

Rural locality in Russia

Ust-Kan Усть-Кан
- Selo

Other transcription(s)
  - Altai: Кан Оозы
  - Kazakh: Қан
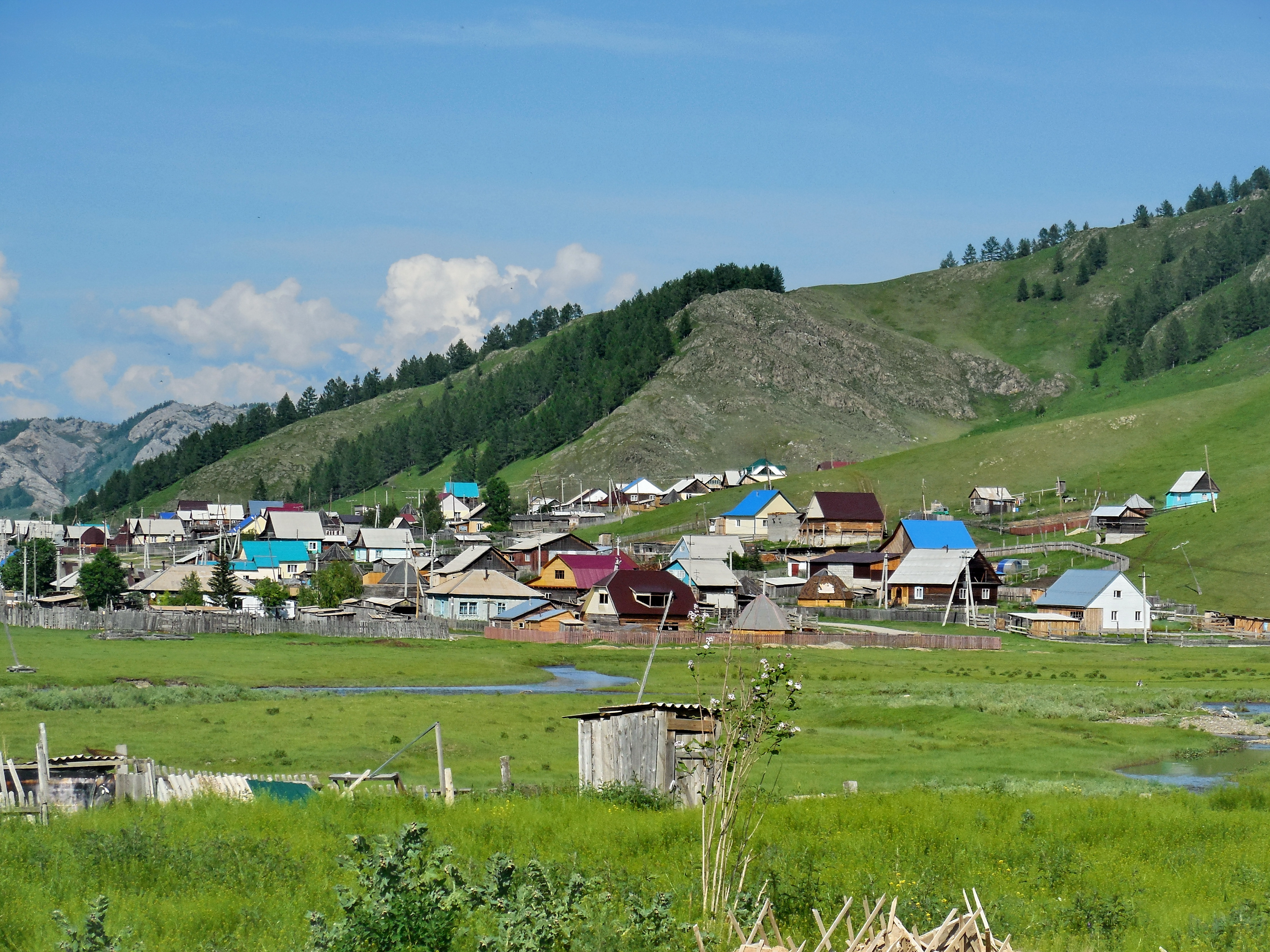

- Flag
- Interactive map of Ust-Kan
- Location of Ust-Kan Ust-Kan (Altai Republic)
- Coordinates: 50°55′59″N 84°45′55″E
- Country: Russia
- Federal subject: Altai Republic
- Administrative district: Ust-Kansky District
- SelsovietSelsoviet: Ust-Kansky
- Founded: 1876
- Elevation: 1,010 m (3,310 ft)

Population (2010 Census)
  - Total: 4,123
  - Estimate (2021): 4,892 (+18.7%)

Administrative status
  - Capital of: Ust-Kansky District, Ust-Kansky Selsoviet

Municipal status
  - Municipal district: Ust-Kansky Municipal District
  - Rural settlement: Ust-Kanskoye Rural Settlement
  - Capital of: Ust-Kansky Municipal District, Ust-Kanskoye Rural Settlement
- Time zone: UTC+6 (MSK+3)
- Postal code: 649450
- OKTMO ID: 84635465101

Ust-Kan (Russian: Усть-Ка́н, romanized: Ust'-Kan; Altay: Кан-Оозы, romanized: Qan-Ôzı; Kazakh: Қан, romanized: Qan) is a rural locality (a selo) and the administrative center of Ust-Kansky District of the Altai Republic, Russia. Population: 4,123 (2010 census); 3,528 (2002 census); 3,022 (1989 Soviet census).
