= Ust-Kansky District =

Ust-Kansky District Усть-Канский район (Russian)
- District

Other transcription(s)
  - Altai: Кан-Оозы аймак
  - Kazakh: Қан ауданы
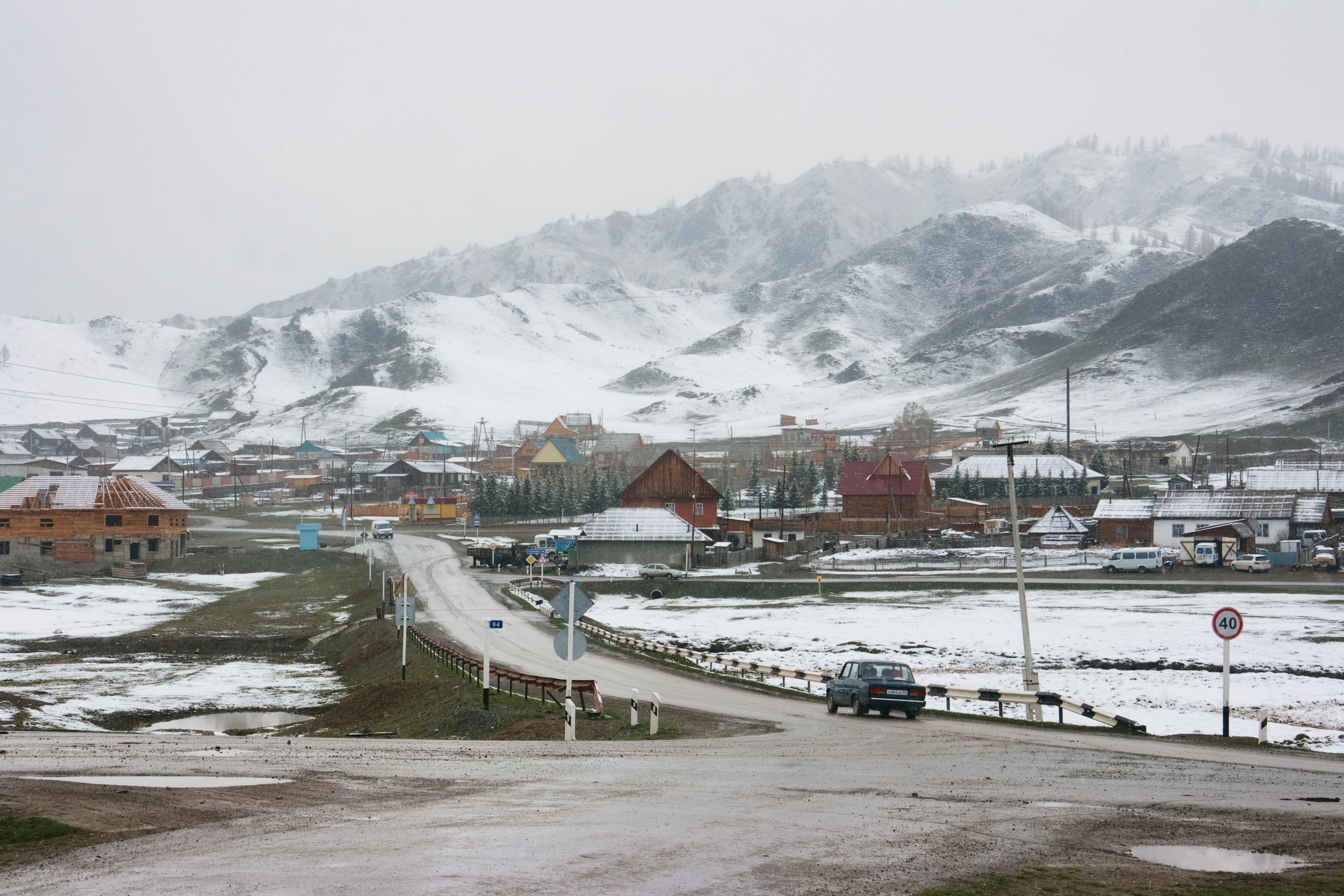
- The selo of Ust-Kan, the administrative center of Ust-Kansky District

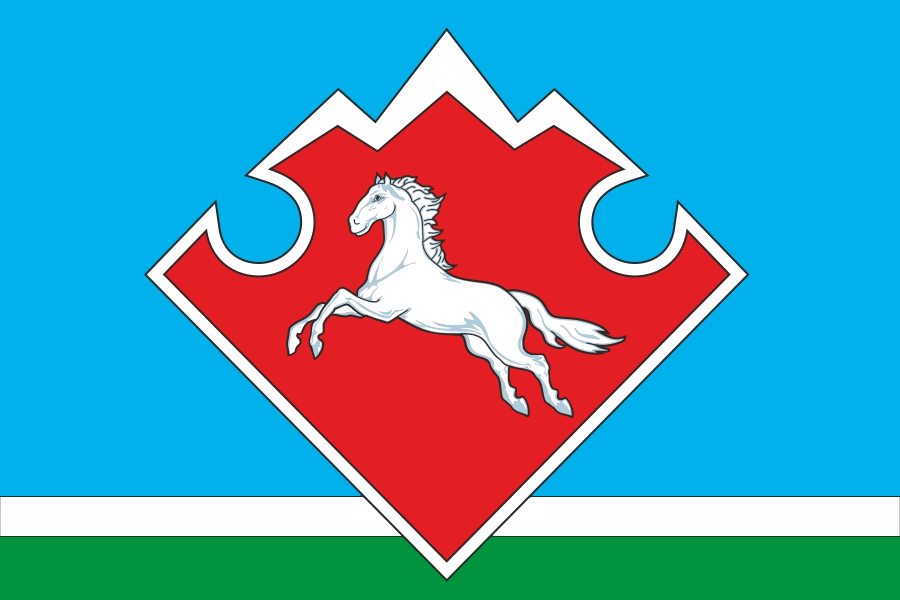
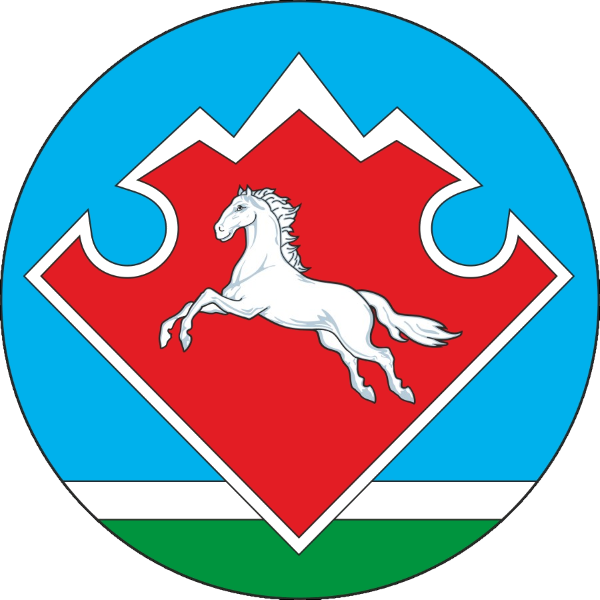
- Flag Coat of arms
- Location of Ust-Kansky District in the Altai Republic
- Coordinates: 50°55′N 84°46′E
- Country: Russia
- Federal subject: Altai Republic
- Established: 1924
- Administrative center: Ust-Kan

Area
  - Total: 6,244 km^{2} (2,411 sq mi)

Population (2010 Census)
  - Total: 15,007
  - Density: 2.403/km^{2} (6.225/sq mi)
  - Urban: 0%
  - Rural: 100%

Administrative structure
  - Administrative divisions: 11 Rural settlements
  - Inhabited localities: 24 rural localities

Municipal structure
  - Municipally incorporated as: Ust-Kansky Municipal District
  - Municipal divisions: 0 urban settlements, 11 rural settlements
- Time zone: UTC+6 (MSK+3)
- OKTMO ID: 84635000
- Website: http://www.moust-kan.ru

Population of Ust-Kansky District
- 2010 Census: 15,007
- 2002 Census: 15,482
- 1989 Census: 16,123
- 1979 Census: 14,704

Ust-Kansky District (Russian: Усть-Ка́нский райо́н, Ust'-Kanskiy rayon; Altay: Кан-Оозы аймак, romanized: Qan-Ôzı aymaq; Kazakh: Қан ауданы, romanized: Qan awdanı) is an administrative and municipal district (raion), one of the ten in the Altai Republic, Russia. It is located in the west of the republic. The area of the district is 6,244 square kilometers (2,411 sq mi). Its administrative center is the rural locality (a selo) of Ust-Kan. As of the 2010 Census, the total population of the district was 15,007, with the population of Ust-Kan accounting for 27.5% of that number.

== Administrative and municipal status ==
Within the framework of administrative divisions, Ust-Kansky District is one of the ten in the Altai Republic. As a municipal division, the district is incorporated as Ust-Kansky Municipal District. Both administrative and municipal districts are divided into the same eleven rural settlements, comprising twenty-four rural localities. The selo of Ust-Kan serves as the administrative center of both the administrative and municipal district.
