= Chemal =

Chemal Чемал
- Selo

Other transcription(s)
  - Altai: Чамал
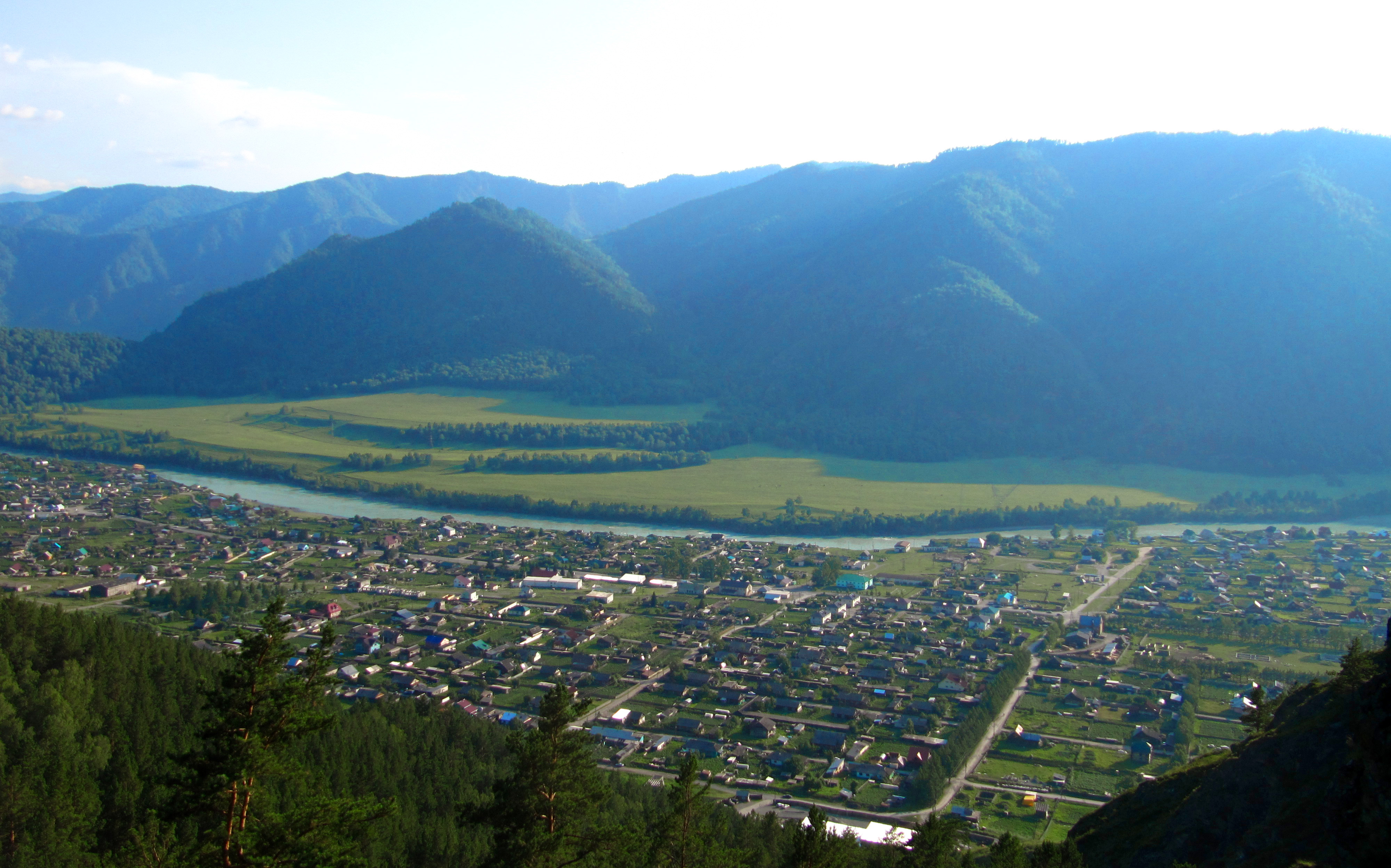

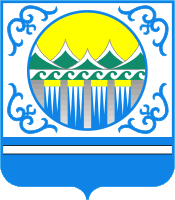
- Coat of arms
- Interactive map of Chemal
- Location of Chemal Chemal (Altai Republic)
- Coordinates: 51°23′52″N 86°01′24″E
- Country: Russia
- Federal subject: Altai Republic
- Administrative district: Chemalsky District
- SelsovietSelsoviet: Chemalsky
- Founded: 1842

Population (2010 Census)
  - Total: 3,602
  - Estimate (2016): 4,011 (+11.4%)

Administrative status
  - Capital of: Chemalsky District, Chemalsky Selsoviet

Municipal status
  - Municipal district: Chemalsky Municipal District
  - Rural settlement: Chemalskoye Rural Settlement
  - Capital of: Chemalsky Municipal District, Chemalskoye Rural Settlement
- Time zone: UTC+6 (MSK+3)
- Postal code: 649240
- OKTMO ID: 84643455101

Chemal (Russian: Чемал, Chemal; Altay: Чамал, Çamal) is a rural locality (a selo) and the administrative center of Chemalsky District of the Altai Republic, Russia. Population: 3,602 (2010 census); 3,266 (2002 census);

== Climate ==
Chemal has a warm-summer humid continental climate (Köppen climate classification Dwb) with mild summers and very cold winters.

Climate data for Chemal
Month	Jan	Feb	Mar	Apr	May	Jun	Jul	Aug	Sep	Oct	Nov	Dec	Year
Record high °C (°F)	15.2 (59.4)	16.4 (61.5)	24.9 (76.8)	33.6 (92.5)	37.3 (99.1)	39.0 (102.2)	39.5 (103.1)	40.6 (105.1)	36.3 (97.3)	28.9 (84.0)	23.2 (73.8)	17.2 (63.0)	40.6 (105.1)
Mean daily maximum °C (°F)	−5.8 (21.6)	−1.1 (30.0)	7.5 (45.5)	15.5 (59.9)	21.5 (70.7)	25.6 (78.1)	27.0 (80.6)	25.4 (77.7)	19.5 (67.1)	12.6 (54.7)	2.3 (36.1)	−4.2 (24.4)	12.2 (53.9)
Daily mean °C (°F)	−11.7 (10.9)	−9.2 (15.4)	−1.6 (29.1)	6.7 (44.1)	12.5 (54.5)	17.4 (63.3)	19.1 (66.4)	17.1 (62.8)	11.2 (52.2)	5.1 (41.2)	−3.3 (26.1)	−9.2 (15.4)	4.5 (40.1)
Mean daily minimum °C (°F)	−15.9 (3.4)	−14.7 (5.5)	−7.7 (18.1)	0.1 (32.2)	5.6 (42.1)	11.0 (51.8)	13.4 (56.1)	11.4 (52.5)	5.8 (42.4)	0.5 (32.9)	−7.2 (19.0)	−13.1 (8.4)	−0.9 (30.4)
Record low °C (°F)	−45 (−49)	−37.7 (−35.9)	−31.1 (−24.0)	−22.2 (−8.0)	−7.8 (18.0)	−0.7 (30.7)	3.5 (38.3)	1.3 (34.3)	−7.8 (18.0)	−21.1 (−6.0)	−38.2 (−36.8)	−33.9 (−29.0)	−45 (−49)
Average precipitation mm (inches)	8 (0.3)	9 (0.4)	16 (0.6)	39 (1.5)	65 (2.6)	91 (3.6)	105 (4.1)	82 (3.2)	50 (2.0)	28 (1.1)	22 (0.9)	10 (0.4)	525 (20.7)
Source: Pogoda.ru.net
