= Chemalsky District =

Chemalsky District Чемальский район (Russian)
- District

Other transcription(s)
  - Altay: Чамал аймак
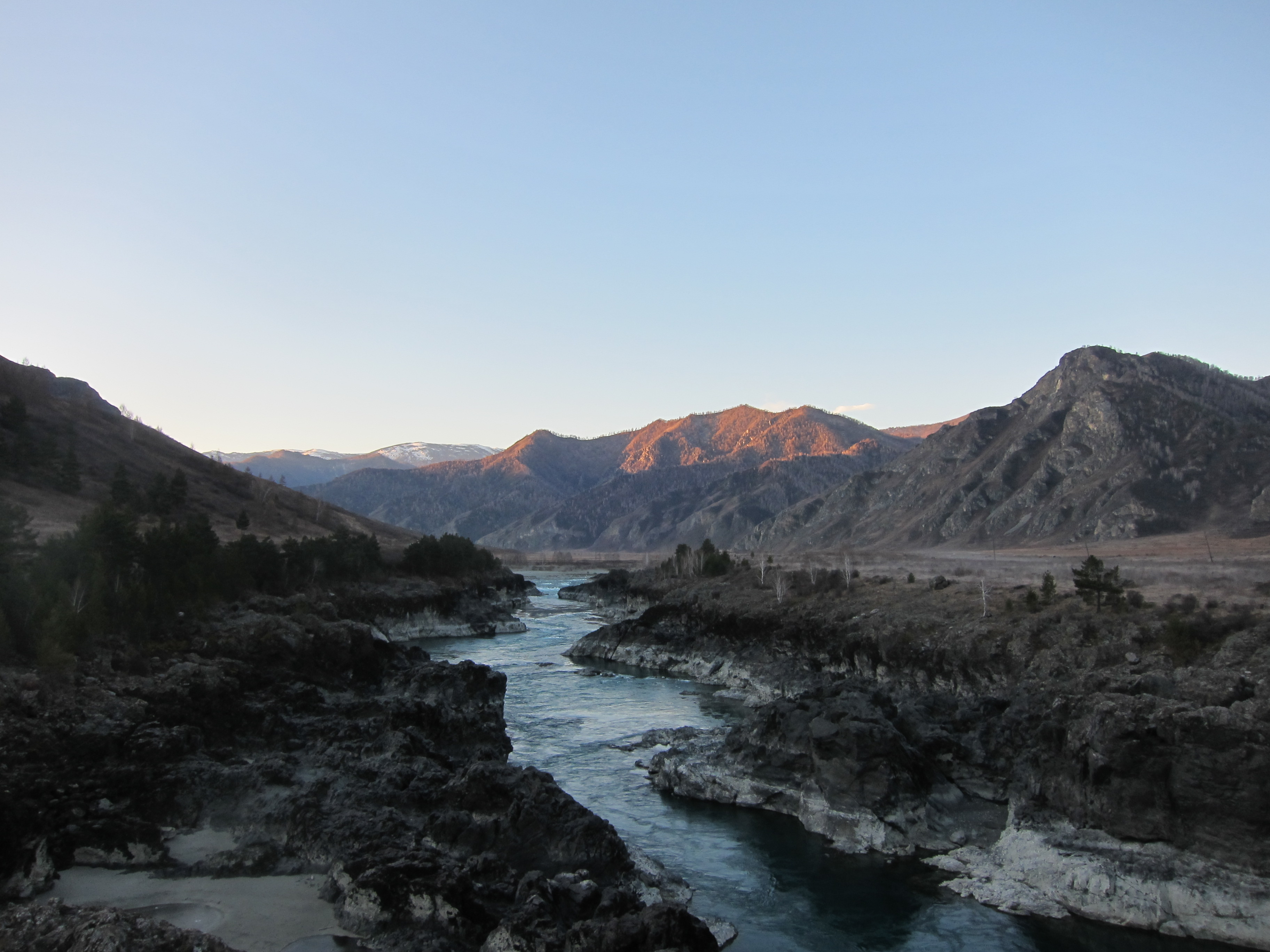
- The Katun River in Chemalsky District

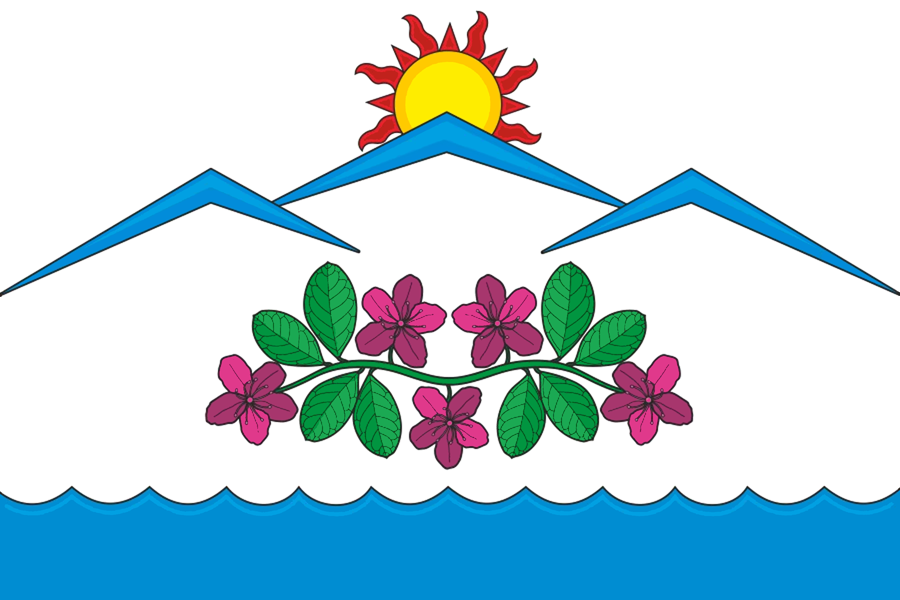
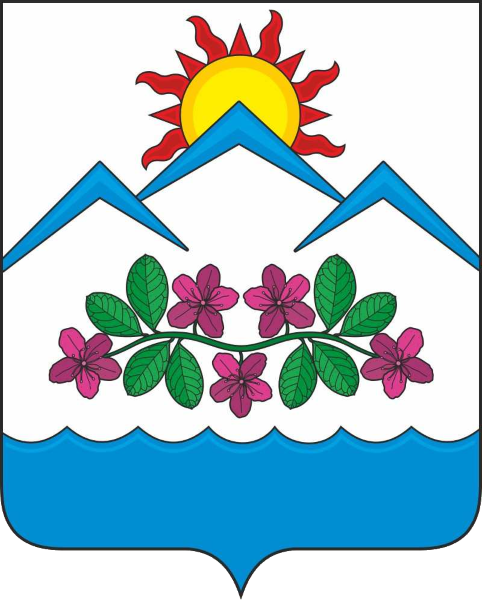
- Flag Coat of arms
- Location of Chemalsky District in the Altai Republic
- Coordinates: 51°25′N 86°00′E
- Country: Russia
- Federal subject: Altai Republic
- Established: August 26, 1992
- Administrative center: Chemal

Government
  - Type: Local government
  - Head: Rodion Bukachakov

Area
  - Total: 3,016 km^{2} (1,164 sq mi)

Population (2010 Census)
  - Total: 9,441
  - Density: 3.130/km^{2} (8.107/sq mi)
  - Urban: 0%
  - Rural: 100%

Administrative structure
  - Administrative divisions: 7 Rural settlements
  - Inhabited localities: 19 rural localities

Municipal structure
  - Municipally incorporated as: Chemalsky Municipal District
  - Municipal divisions: 0 urban settlements, 7 rural settlements
- Time zone: UTC+6 (MSK+3)
- OKTMO ID: 84643000
- Website: http://www.chemal-altai.ru

Population of Chemalsky District
- 2010 Census: 9,441
- 2002 Census: 9,023

Chemalsky District (Russian: Чема́льский райо́н, Chemal'skiy rayon; Altay: Чамал аймак, Çamal aymak) is an administrative and municipal district (raion), one of the ten in the Altai Republic, Russia. It is located in the northwest of the republic. The area of the district is 3,016 square kilometers (1,164 sq mi). Its administrative center is the rural locality (a selo) of Chemal. As of the 2010 Census, the total population of the district was 9,441, with the population of Chemal accounting for 38.2% of that number.

== History ==
The district was established on August 26, 1992, when it was split from Shebalinsky District.

== Administrative and municipal status ==
Within the framework of administrative divisions, Chemalsky District is one of the ten in the Altai Republic. As a municipal division, the district is incorporated as Chemalsky Municipal District. Both administrative and municipal districts are divided into the same seven rural settlements, comprising nineteen rural localities. The selo of Chemal serves as the administrative center of both the administrative and municipal district.
