= Amur (disambiguation) =

The Amur is a major river in Russia and China, forming part of the border between these countries.

Amur may also refer to:

== Places ==
- Amur, Altai Republic, a rural locality in Ust-Koksinsky District, the Altai Republic, Russia
- Amur Oblast, a federal subject of Russia
- Amur Bay, a body of water in Peter the Great Gulf
- Amur State University, a university in Russia
- Amur Liman, the estuary of the river
- Amur Point, a point on the east shore of Moresby Island, British Columbia, Canada

== Sports ==
- Golden Amur, a defunct Russian ice hockey team
- Amur Khabarovsk, a Russian ice hockey team

== Transportation ==
- Amur-class motorship, a classification of passenger ships from Russia
- Amur-class submarine, a classification of Russian submarine
- Amur (launch vehicle), a partially-reusable Russian launch vehicle being designed in 2020 for first flight ~2026.

== Organisms ==
- Amur bitterling (Amur bitterling), a fish
- Amur catfish (Silurus asotus), a fish
- Amur falcon (Falco amurensis), a bird
- Amur hedgehog (Erinaceus amurensis), a mammal
- Amur lemming (Lemmus amurensis), a mammal
- Amur maple (Acer ginnala), a tree
- Amur honeysuckle (Lonicera maackii), a shrub
- Amur leopard (Panthera pardus orientalis), a leopard subspecies
- Amur peppervine (Ampelopsis glandulosa var. brevipedunculata), a plant
- Amur privet (Ligustrum obtusifolium), a plant
- Amur silver-grass (Miscanthus sacchariflorus), a plant
- Amur sleeper (Perccottus glenii), a fish
- Amur tiger (Panther tigris tigris), another name for a Siberian tiger
- Amur viper (Gloydius saxatilis), a snake
- Amur virus, an RNA virus
- Amur wagtail (Motacilla alba leucopsis), a bird

== People with the surname ==
- G. S. Amur, Indian writer
- K. S. Amur, Indian mathematician

== Other uses ==
- Amur (company), former Russian manufacturing company
- Amur, a tiger, part of the tiger-goat pair Amur and Timur in a Russian zoo

== See also ==
- Amursky (disambiguation)
- Amursk
- Amour (disambiguation)
- Ammer (disambiguation)
- Amurian Plate, a tectonic plate
