= Karagay =

Set index of articles associated with the same name

Karagay (Russian: Карагай) is the name of several rural localities in Russia:

- Karagay, Altai Republic, a selo in Karagayskoye Rural Settlement of Ust-Koksinsky District of the Altai Republic
- Karagay, Arkhangelsky District, Republic of Bashkortostan, a village in Uzunlarovsky Selsoviet of Arkhangelsky District of the Republic of Bashkortostan
- Karagay, Kuyurgazinsky District, Republic of Bashkortostan, a village in Ilkineyevsky Selsoviet of Kuyurgazinsky District of the Republic of Bashkortostan
- Karagay, Republic of Khakassia, a village in Butrakhtinsky Selsoviet of Tashtypsky District of the Republic of Khakassia
- Karagay, Kirov Oblast, a village in Pashinsky Rural Okrug of Afanasyevsky District of Kirov Oblast
- Karagay, Perm Krai, a selo in Karagaysky District of Perm Krai
- Karagay, Samara Oblast, a settlement in Krasnoarmeysky District of Samara Oblast
- Karagay, Republic of Tatarstan, a village in Leninogorsky District of the Republic of Tatarstan
- Karagay, Tyumen Oblast, a village in Vagaysky District of Tyumen Oblast
