= Krasnoyarka =

Krasnoyarka (Russian: Красноярка) is the name of several rural localities in Russia.

== Altai Krai ==
As of 2022, three rural localities in Altai Krai bear this name:

- Krasnoyarka, Novichikhinsky District, Altai Krai, a settlement in Solonovsky Selsoviet of Novichikhinsky District
- Krasnoyarka, Topchikhinsky District, Altai Krai, a selo in Krasnoyarsky Selsoviet of Topchikhinsky District
- Krasnoyarka, Ust-Pristansky District, Altai Krai, a selo in Krasnoyarsky Selsoviet of Ust-Pristansky District

== Altai Republic ==
As of 2022, two rural localities in the Altai Republic bear this name:

- Krasnoyarka, Amurskoye Rural Settlement, Ust-Koksinsky District, Altai Republic, a settlement in Amurskoye Rural Settlement of Ust-Koksinsky District
- Krasnoyarka, Ust-Koksinskoye Rural Settlement, Ust-Koksinsky District, Altai Republic, a settlement in Ust-Koksinskoye Rural Settlement of Ust-Koksinsky District

== Kemerovo Oblast ==
As of 2022, two rural localities in Kemerovo Oblast bear this name:

- Krasnoyarka, Demyanovskaya Rural Territory, Leninsk-Kuznetsky District, Kemerovo Oblast, a village in Demyanovskaya Rural Territory of Leninsk-Kuznetsky District
- Krasnoyarka, Podgornovskaya Rural Territory, Leninsk-Kuznetsky District, Kemerovo Oblast, a settlement in Podgornovskaya Rural Territory of Leninsk-Kuznetsky District

== Kurgan Oblast ==
As of 2022, two rural localities in Kurgan Oblast bear this name:

- Krasnoyarka, Kirovsky Selsoviet, Mishkinsky District, Kurgan Oblast, a village in Kirovsky Selsoviet of Mishkinsky District
- Krasnoyarka, Maslinsky Selsoviet, Mishkinsky District, Kurgan Oblast, a village in Maslinsky Selsoviet of Mishkinsky District

== Novosibirsk Oblast ==
As of 2022, two rural localities in Novosibirsk Oblast bear this name:

- Krasnoyarka, Tatarsky District, Novosibirsk Oblast, a selo in Tatarsky District
- Krasnoyarka, Vengerovsky District, Novosibirsk Oblast, a village in Vengerovsky District

== Omsk Oblast ==
As of 2022, four rural localities in Omsk Oblast bear this name:

- Krasnoyarka, Omsky District, Omsk Oblast, a selo in Krasnoyarsky Rural Okrug of Omsky District
- Krasnoyarka, Sherbakulsky District, Omsk Oblast, a selo in Krasnoyarsky Rural Okrug of Sherbakulsky District
- Krasnoyarka, Kaylinsky Rural Okrug, Ust-Ishimsky District, Omsk Oblast, a village in Kaylinsky Rural Okrug of Ust-Ishimsky District
- Krasnoyarka, Utuskunsky Rural Okrug, Ust-Ishimsky District, Omsk Oblast, a village in Utuskunsky Rural Okrug of Ust-Ishimsky District

== Orenburg Oblast ==
As of 2022, two rural localities in Orenburg Oblast bear this name:

- Krasnoyarka, Buguruslansky District, Orenburg Oblast, a selo in Zavyalovsky Selsoviet of Buguruslansky District
- Krasnoyarka, Severny District, Orenburg Oblast, a selo in Krasnoyarsky Selsoviet of Severny District

== Samara Oblast ==
As of 2022, one rural locality in Samara Oblast bears this name:

- Krasnoyarka, Samara Oblast, a settlement in Sergiyevsky District

== Sverdlovsk Oblast ==
As of 2022, one rural locality in Sverdlovsk Oblast bears this name:

- Krasnoyarka, Sverdlovsk Oblast, a settlement under the administrative jurisdiction of the Town of Serov

== Tomsk Oblast ==
As of 2022, one rural locality in Tomsk Oblast bears this name:

- Krasnoyarka, Tomsk Oblast, a selo in Zyryansky District
