= Soochong virus =

Virus classification
- (unranked): Virus
- Realm: Riboviria
- Kingdom: Orthornavirae
- Phylum: Negarnaviricota
- Class: Bunyaviricetes
- Order: Elliovirales
- Family: Hantaviridae
- Genus: Orthohantavirus (?)
- Virus: Soochong virus

Synonyms
- Amur virus

Species of virus

Soochong virus (SOOV) is a zoonotic negative sense single-stranded RNA virus. It may be a member of the genus Orthohantavirus, but it has not been definitively classified as a species and may only be a strain. It is one of four rodent-borne Hantaviruses found in the Republic of Korea. It is the etiologic agent for Hantavirus hemorrhagic fever with renal syndrome (HFRS). The other species responsible for HFRS in Korea are Seoul virus, Haantan virus, and Muju virus.

Soochong was isolated from four Korean field mice (Apodemus peninsulae) captured in August 1997 at Mt. Gyebang in Hongcheon-gun, Mt. Gachil, Inje-gun, Gangwon Province, and in September 1998 at Mt. Deogyu, Muju-gun, Jeollabuk Province.

== Transmission ==
This species of Hantavirus has not been shown to transfer from person-to-person. Transmission by aerosolized rodent excreta still remains the only known way the virus is transmitted to humans. In general, drop-let and/or fomite transfer has not been shown in the hantaviruses in either the hemorrhagic or pulmonary forms.

== See also ==
- Conjunctival suffusion
- List of cutaneous conditions
- Sweating sickness, which may have been caused by a hantavirus
- 1993 Four Corners hantavirus outbreak
