= Abay, Altai Republic =

Abay Абай
- Selo
- Location within Altai Republic Location within Russia
- Coordinates: 50°25′N 85°03′E
- Country: Russia
- Region: Altai Republic
- District: Ust-Koksinsky District
- Time zone: UTC+7:00

Abay (Russian: Абай; Altay: Абай) is a rural locality (a selo) in Ust-Koksinsky District, the Altai Republic, Russia. The population was 362 as of 2016. There are 4 streets.

== Geography ==
Abay is located 52 km northwest of Ust-Koksa (the district's administrative centre) by road. Amur is the nearest rural locality.
