= Tyungur =

Tyungur Тюнгур
- Village
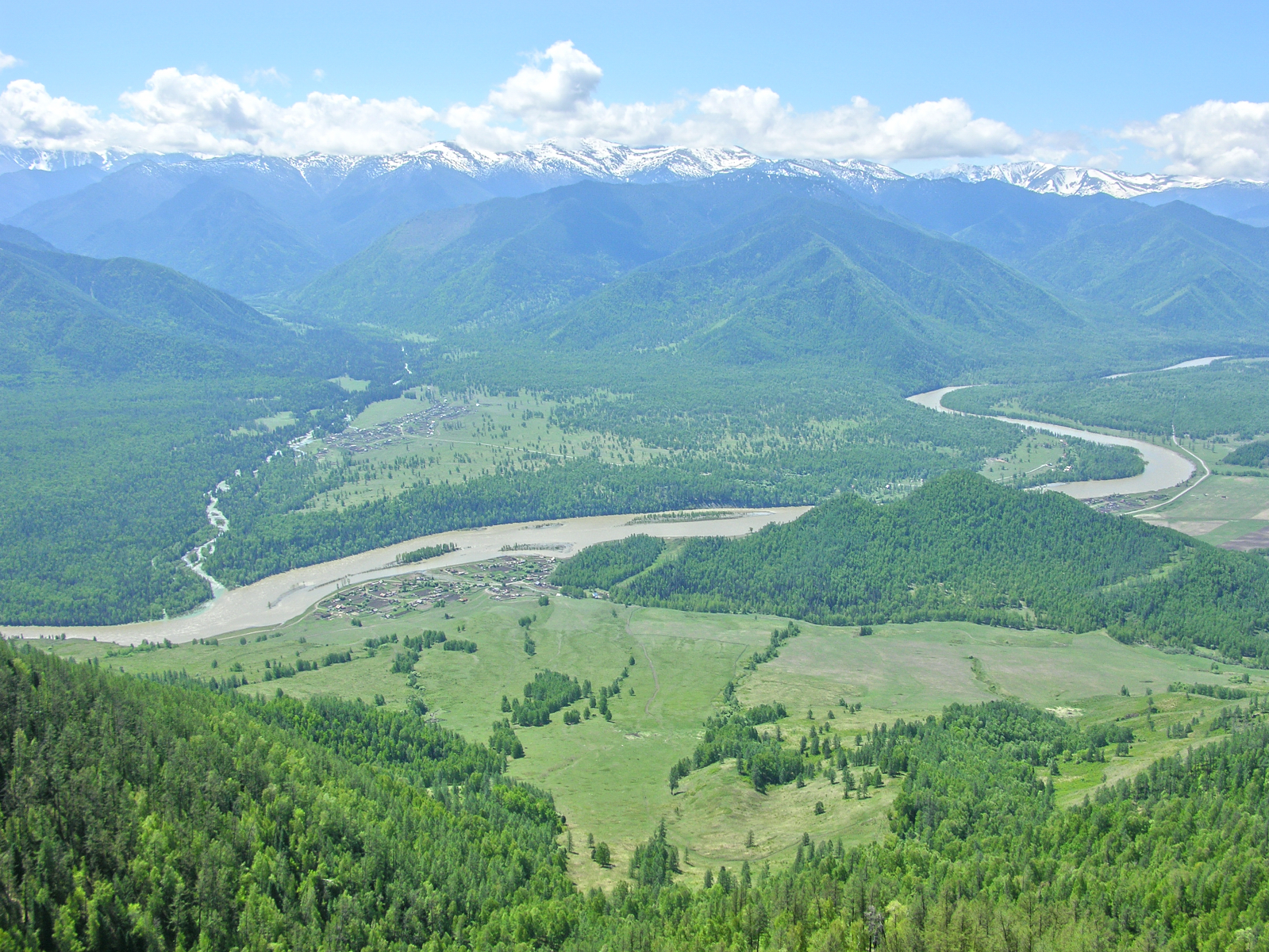
- Village of Tungur with Katun Mountains in the background (English)

- Location within Altai Republic Location within Russia
- Coordinates: 50°09′N 86°18′E
- Country: Russia
- Region: Altai Republic
- District: Ust-Koksinsky District
- Time zone: UTC+7:00

Tyungur (Russian: Тюнгур; Altay: Тӱҥӱр, Tüñür) is a rural locality (a selo) in Katandinskoye Rural Settlement of Ust-Koksinsky District, the Altai Republic, Russia. The population was 348 as of 2016. There are 12 streets.

== History ==
Pavel Kuzmin established this village in the year 1898, near the river mouth of the Tyungur River, the reason of the village's name. The village initially consisted of two homes, however by the year 1926, there were already 50 homes and 292 people.

== Geography ==
Tyungur is located on the left bank of the Katun River, 60 km southeast of Ust-Koksa (the district's administrative centre) by road. Kucherla is the nearest rural locality.
