= Multa =

Multa Мульта
- Village
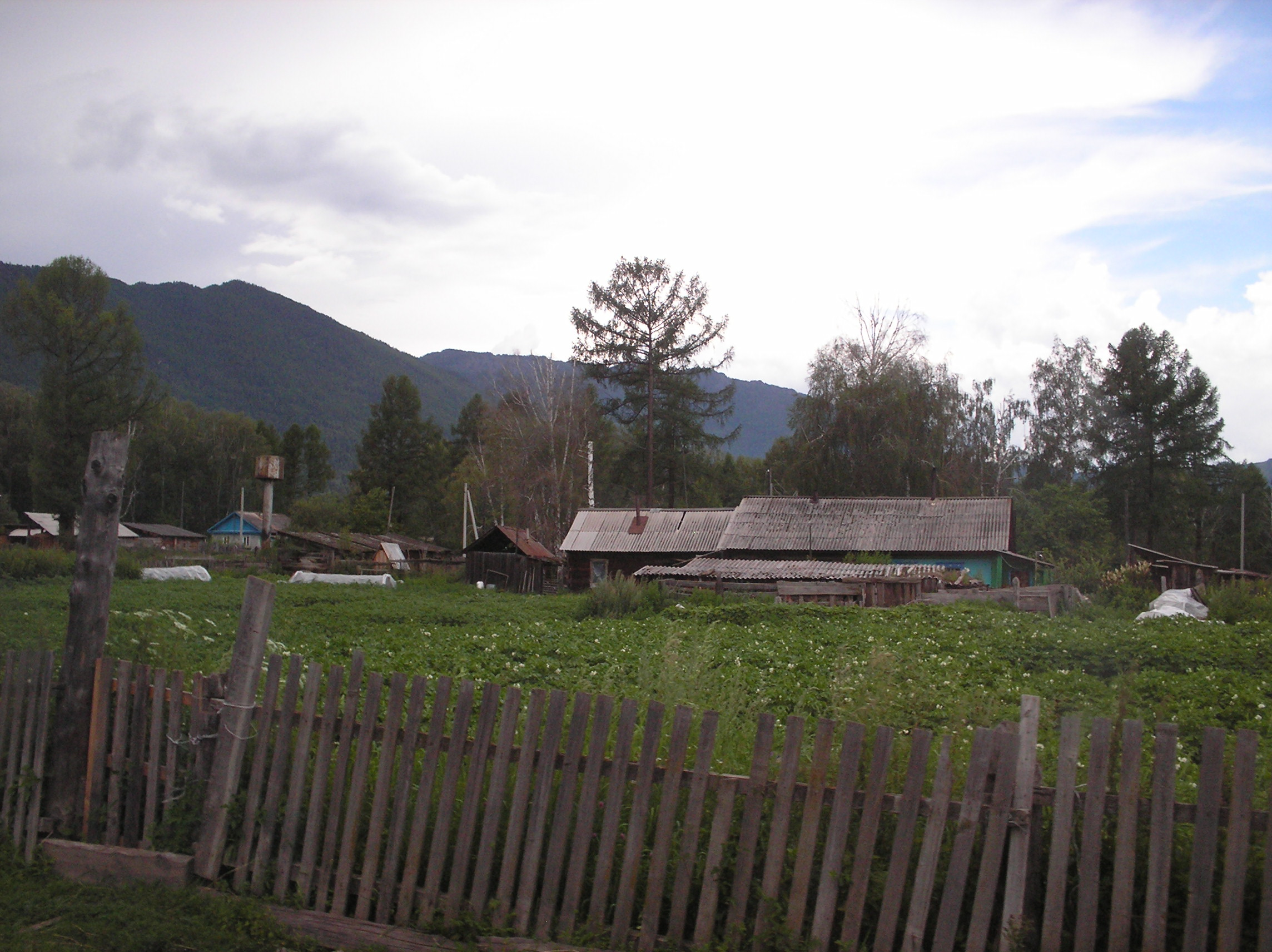

- Location within Altai Republic Location within Russia
- Coordinates: 50°10′N 85°57′E
- Country: Russia
- Region: Altai Republic
- District: Ust-Koksinsky District
- Time zone: UTC+7:00

Multa (Russian: Мульта; Altay: Мый Туу, Mıy Tuu) is a rural locality (a selo) in Verkh-Uymonskoye Rural Settlement of Ust-Koksinsky District, the Altai Republic, Russia. The population was 704 as of 2016. There are 10 streets.

== Geography ==
Multa is located on the right bank of the Katun River, 33 km southeast of Ust-Koksa (the district's administrative centre) by road. Zamulta is the nearest rural locality.
