= Gachilbong =

Gachilbong may refer to:

- Gachilbong (Inje County/Yanggu County), a mountain in South Korea
- Gachilbong (Inje County), a mountain in South Korea
