= Amursky (rural locality) =

Amursky (Russian: Амурский; masculine), Amurskaya (Амурская; feminine), or Amurskoye (Амурское; neuter) is the name of several rural localities in Russia:

- Amursky, Altai Krai, a settlement in Biysky District of Altai Krai
- Amursky, Chelyabinsk Oblast, a settlement in Bredinsky District of Chelyabinsk Oblast
- Amurskoye, a selo in Belogorsky District of Amur Oblast
