= Amur, Altai Republic =

Amur Амур
- Selo
- Location within Altai Republic Location within Russia
- Coordinates: 50°23′N 85°07′E
- Country: Russia
- Region: Altai Republic
- District: Ust-Koksinsky District
- Time zone: UTC+7:00

Amur (Russian: Амур; Altay: Амыр, Amır) is a rural locality (a selo) and the administrative centre of Amurskoye Rural Settlement, Ust-Koksinsky District, the Altai Republic, Russia. The population was 763 as of 2016. There are 11 streets.

== Geography ==
Amur is located 47 km northwest of Ust-Koksa (the district's administrative centre) by road. Abay is the nearest rural locality.
