= Adolf Weil =

Adolf Weil may refer to:

- Adolf Weil (physician) (1848/49–1916), German physician
- Adolf Weil (motorcyclist) (1938–2011), German Grand Prix motocross racer
