= Karagay, Altai Republic =

Karagay Карагай
- Selo
- Location within Altai Republic Location within Russia
- Coordinates: 50°23′N 84°37′E
- Country: Russia
- Region: Altai Republic
- District: Ust-Koksinsky District
- Time zone: UTC+7:00

Karagay (Russian: Карагай; Altay: Карагай) is a rural locality (a selo) and the administrative centre of Karagayskoye Rural Settlement, Ust-Koksinsky District, the Altai Republic, Russia. The population was 446 as of 2016. There are 14 streets.

== Geography ==
Karagay is located 92 km northwest of Ust-Koksa (the district's administrative centre) by road. Kurdyum is the nearest rural locality.
