= Amursky =

Amursky (masculine), Amurskaya (feminine), or Amurskoye (neuter) may refer to:

- Amursky District, a district of Khabarovsk Krai, Russia
- Amursky (rural locality) (Amurskaya, Amurskoye), name of several rural localities in Russia
- Amur Oblast (Amurskaya Oblast), a federal subject of Russia
