= Leptospirosis =

Blood infection caused by bacteria

- Other names: Rat fever, field fever, rat catcher's yellows, pretibial fever
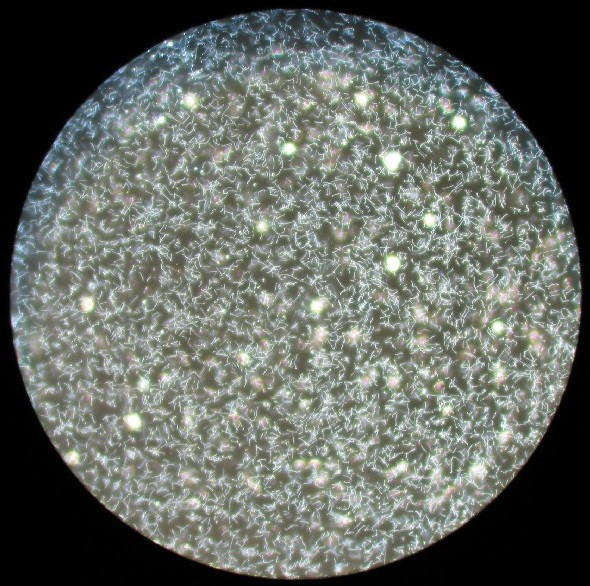
- Leptospira magnified 200-fold with a dark-field microscope
- Specialty: Infectious disease
- Symptoms: None, headaches, muscle pains, fevers
- Complications: Bleeding from the lungs, meningitis, kidney failure
- Usual onset: One to two weeks
- Causes: Leptospira typically spread by rodents
- Risk factors: Exposure to infected animals, especially their urine, or fresh water or damp soil contaminated with infectious urine
- Diagnostic method: Testing blood for antibodies against the bacterium or its DNA
- Differential diagnosis: Malaria, enteric fever, rickettsiosis, dengue
- Prevention: Personal protective equipment, hygiene measures, doxycycline
- Treatment: Doxycycline, penicillin, ceftriaxone
- Prognosis: Risk of death ~7.5%
- Frequency: One million people per year
- Deaths: 58,900 per year

Leptospirosis is a blood infection caused by bacteria of the genus Leptospira that can infect humans, dogs, rodents, and many other wild and domesticated animals. Signs and symptoms can range from none to mild (headaches, muscle pains, and fevers) to severe (bleeding in the lungs or meningitis). Weil's disease (/ˈvaɪlz/ VILES), the acute, severe form of leptospirosis, causes the infected individual to become jaundiced (skin and eyes become yellow), develop kidney failure, and bleed. Bleeding from the lungs associated with leptospirosis is known as severe pulmonary haemorrhage syndrome.

More than 10 genetic types of Leptospira cause disease in humans. Both wild and domestic animals can spread the disease, most commonly rodents. The bacteria are spread to humans through animal urine or feces, or water or soil contaminated with animal urine and feces, coming into contact with the eyes, mouth, or nose, or breaks in the skin. In developing countries, the disease occurs most commonly in pest control, farmers, and low-income people who live in areas with poor sanitation. In developed countries, it occurs during heavy downpours and is a risk to pest controllers, sewage workers, and those involved in outdoor activities in warm and wet areas. Diagnosis is typically by testing for antibodies against the bacteria or finding bacterial DNA in the blood.

Efforts to prevent the disease include protective equipment to block contact when working with potentially infected animals, washing after contact, and reducing rodents in areas where people live and work. The antibiotic doxycycline is effective in preventing leptospirosis infection. Human vaccines are of limited usefulness; vaccines for other animals are more widely available. Treatment when infected is with antibiotics such as doxycycline, penicillin, or ceftriaxone. Mortality from severe disease forms, Weil's disease and severe pulmonary haemorrhage syndrome, is high (>10% and >50%, respectively) even when optimal treatment is provided. When the lungs are involved, the risk of death increases to the range of 50–70%.

An estimated one million severe cases of leptospirosis in humans occur every year, causing about 58,900 deaths. The disease is most common in tropical areas of the world, but may occur anywhere. Outbreaks may arise after heavy rainfall. The disease was first described by physician Adolf Weil in 1886 in Germany. Infected animals may have no, mild, or severe symptoms. These may vary by the type of animal. In some animals, Leptospira live in the reproductive tract, leading to transmission during mating.

== Signs and symptoms ==
Schematic depiction of the symptoms and signs of leptospirosis

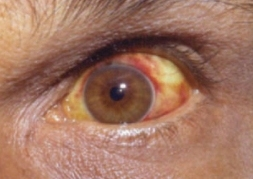
Conjunctival suffusion (red conjunctiva) together with jaundice is a specific feature of leptospirosis.

The symptoms of leptospirosis usually appear one to two weeks after infection, but the incubation period can be as long as a month. The illness is biphasic in a majority of symptomatic cases. Symptoms of the first phase (acute or leptospiremic phase) last five to seven days. In the second phase (immune phase), the symptoms resolve as antibodies against the bacteria are produced. Additional symptoms develop in the second phase. The phases of illness may not be distinct, especially in patients with severe illness. About 90% of those infected experience mild symptoms, while 10% experience severe leptospirosis.

Leptospiral infection in humans causes a range of symptoms, though some infected persons may have none. The disease begins suddenly with fever accompanied by chills, intense headache, severe muscle aches, and abdominal pain. A headache brought on by leptospirosis causes throbbing pain and is characteristically located at the head's bilateral temporal or frontal regions. The person could also have pain behind the eyes and a sensitivity to light. Muscle pain usually involves the calf muscle and the lower back. The most characteristic feature of leptospirosis is the conjunctival suffusion (conjunctivitis without exudate), which is rarely found in other febrile illnesses. Other characteristic findings on the eye include subconjunctival bleeding and jaundice. A rash is rarely found in leptospirosis. When one is found, alternative diagnoses such as dengue fever and chikungunya fever should be considered. Dry cough is observed in 20–57% of people with leptospirosis. Thus, this clinical feature can mislead a doctor to diagnose the disease as a respiratory illness. Additionally, gastrointestinal symptoms such as nausea, vomiting, abdominal pain, and diarrhoea frequently occur. Vomiting and diarrhoea may contribute to dehydration. The abdominal pain can be due to acalculous cholecystitis or inflammation of the pancreas. Rarely, the lymph nodes, liver, and spleen may be enlarged and palpable.

Resolution of symptoms occurs for one to three days. The immune phase starts after this and can last from four to 30 days, and can vary from brain to kidney complications. The hallmark of the second phase is inflammation of the membranes covering the brain. Signs and symptoms of meningitis include severe headache and neck stiffness. Kidney involvement is associated with reduced or absent urine output.

The classic form of severe leptospirosis, known as Weil's disease, is characterised by liver damage (causing jaundice), kidney failure, and bleeding, which happens in 5–10% of those infected. Lung and brain damage can also occur. For those with signs of inflammation of membranes covering the brain and the brain itself, altered level of consciousness can happen. A variety of neurological problems such as paralysis of half of the body, complete inflammation of a whole horizontal section of spinal cord, and Guillain-Barré syndrome are the complications. Signs of bleeding such as petechiae, ecchymoses, nose bleeding, blackish stools due to bleeding in the stomach, vomiting blood, and bleeding from the lungs can also be found. Prolongation of prothrombin time in coagulation testing is associated with severe bleeding manifestations. However, low platelet count is not associated with severe bleeding. Pulmonary haemorrhage is alveolar haemorrhage (bleeding into the alveoli of the lungs) leading to massive coughing up of blood, and causing acute respiratory distress syndrome, where the risk of death is more than 50%. Rarely, inflammation of the heart muscles, inflammation of membranes covering the heart, abnormalities in the heart's natural pacemaker and abnormal heart rhythms may occur.

== Cause ==
=== Bacteria ===
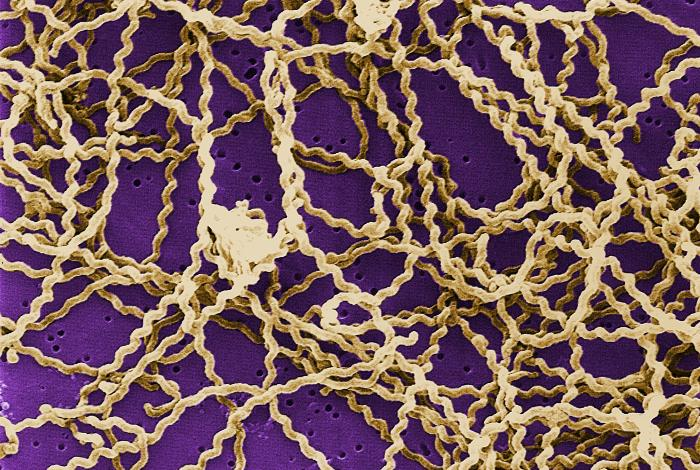
Scanning electron micrograph of a number of Leptospira sp. bacteria atop a 0.1 μm polycarbonate filter

Leptospirosis is caused by spirochaete bacteria that belong to the genus Leptospira, which are aerobic, right-handed helical, and 6–20 micrometers long. Like Gram-negative bacteria, Leptospira species have an outer membrane studded with lipopolysaccharide (LPS) on the surface, an inner membrane, and a layer of peptidoglycan in the cell wall. However, unlike Gram-negative bacteria, the peptidoglycan layer in Leptospira lies closer to the inner than the outer membrane. This results in a fluid outer membrane loosely associated with the cell wall. In addition, Leptospira bacteria have a flagellum located in the periplasm, associated with corkscrew-style movement. Chemoreceptors at the poles of the bacteria sense various substrates and change the direction of their movement. The bacteria are traditionally seen using dark-field microscopy without staining.

In total, 66 species of Leptospira have been identified. Based on their genomic sequence, they are divided into two clades and four subclades: P1, P2, S1, and S2. The 19 members of the P1 subclade include the eight species that can cause severe disease in humans: L. alexanderi, L. borgpetersenii, L. interrogans, L. kirschneri, L. mayottensis, L. noguchii, L. santarosai, and L. weilii. The P2 clade comprises 21 species that may cause mild disease in humans. The remaining 26 species comprise the S1 and S2 subclades, which include "saprophytes" known to consume decaying matter (saprotrophic nutrition). Pathogenic Leptospira species do not multiply in the environment. They require high humidity for survival, but can remain alive in environments such as stagnant water or contaminated soil. The bacteria can be killed by temperatures of 50 °C (122 °F) and can be inactivated by 70% ethanol, 1% sodium hypochlorite, formaldehyde, detergents, and acids.

Leptospira species are also classified based on their serovar. The diverse sugar composition of the lipopolysaccharide on the surface of the bacteria is responsible for the antigenic difference between serovars. About 300 pathogenic serovars of Leptospira are recognised. Antigenically related serovars (belonging to the same serogroup) may belong to different species because of horizontal gene transfer of LPS biosynthetic genes between different species. Currently, the cross-agglutination absorption test and DNA–DNA hybridisation are used to classify Leptospira species, but are time-consuming. Therefore, total genomic sequencing could potentially replace these two methods as the new gold standard of classifying Leptospira species.

=== Transmission ===
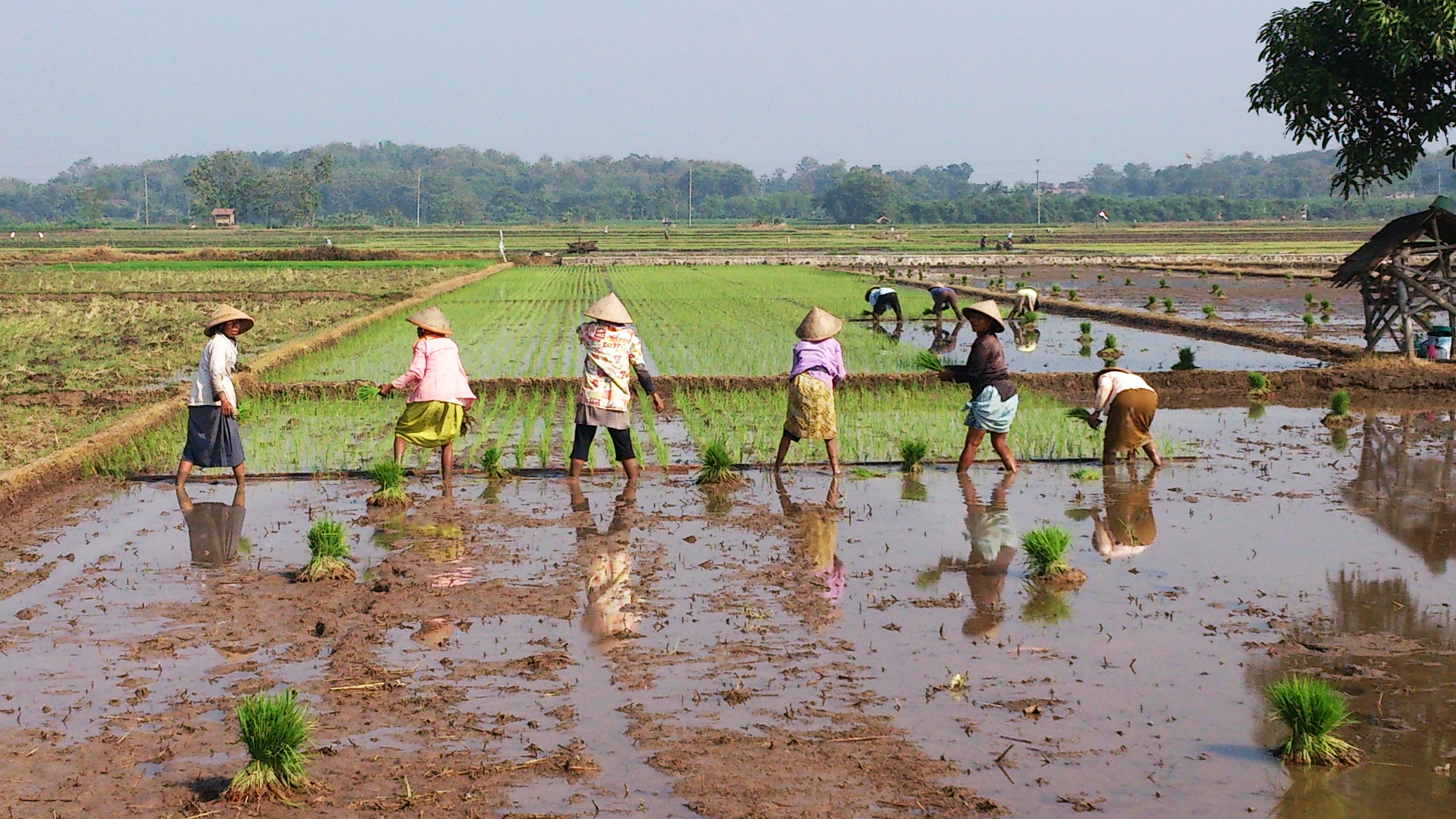
Working in a paddy field barefoot is a risk factor for leptospirosis.

The survival of Leptospira bacteria is influenced by environmental factors, with transmission dynamics affected by climate change, extreme weather events, urbanisation, and interactions between human and animal populations. The bacteria thrive in warm and humid climates due to their preference for environments that maintain high moisture content and optimal temperatures for metabolic activity and motility. The bacteria can be found in ponds, rivers, puddles, sewers, agricultural fields, and moist soil. Pathogenic Leptospira have been found in the form of aquatic biofilms, which may aid survival in the environment.

The number of cases of leptospirosis is directly related to the amount of rainfall, making the disease seasonal in temperate climates and year-round in tropical climates. The risk of contracting leptospirosis depends upon the risk of disease carriage in the community and the frequency of exposure. In rural areas, farming and animal husbandry are the major risk factors for contracting leptospirosis. Poor housing and inadequate sanitation also increase the risk of infection. In tropical and subtropical areas, the disease often becomes widespread after heavy rains or after flooding.

Leptospira bacteria are found mostly in mammals, but cold-blooded animals such as frogs, snakes, turtles, and toads have been shown to have the infection. Whether reservoirs of human infection exist is unknown. Rats, mice, and moles are important primary hosts, but other mammals, including dogs, deer, rabbits, hedgehogs, cattle, sheep, swine, raccoons, opossums, and skunks can also carry the disease. In Africa, a number of wildlife hosts have been identified as carriers, including the banded mongoose, Egyptian fox, Rusa deer, and shrews. Various mechanisms are known whereby animals can infect each other. Dogs may lick the urine of an infected animal off the grass or soil, or drink from an infected puddle. House-bound domestic dogs have contracted leptospirosis, apparently from licking the urine of infected mice in the house. Leptospirosis can also be transmitted by the semen of infected animals. Bacteria can be consistently present in animal urine and may persist for years.

Humans are the accidental host of Leptospira. Humans become infected through contact with water or moist soil that contains urine and feces from infected animals. The bacteria enter through cuts, abrasions, ingestion of contaminated food, or contact with mucous membrane of the body (e.g., mouth, nose, and eyes). Occupations at risk of contracting leptospirosis include farmers, fishermen, garbage collectors, and sewage workers. The disease is also related to adventure tourism and recreational activities. It is common among water-sports enthusiasts in specific areas, including triathlons, water rafting, canoeing, and swimming, as prolonged immersion in water promotes the entry of the bacteria. However, Leptospira species are unlikely to penetrate intact skin. The disease is not known to spread between humans, and bacterial dissemination in recovery period is extremely rare in humans. Once humans are infected, bacterial shedding from the kidneys usually persists for up to 60 days.

Rarely, leptospirosis can be transmitted through an organ transplant. Infection through the placenta during pregnancy is also possible. It can cause miscarriage and infection in infants. Leptospirosis transmission through eating raw meat of wildlife animals has also been reported (e.g. psychiatric patients with allotriophagy).

Transmission of Leptospirosis is via direct or indirect contact with urine from infected animals. These animals can include livestock, rodents, and pet animals. Humans serve as incidental hosts when infections come into contact with broken skin or mucous membranes, or with contaminated soil or water. Inadequate sanitation and hygiene during flooding events increase the transmission rate.

Leptospirosis risk factors include exposures such as farming, swage management, and contact with infected animals. Along with environmental exposure to contaminated water. Leptospirosis outbreaks correlate with heavy rainfall and flooding events. Communities in tropical areas and urban slums are primarily affected.

== Pathogenesis ==
Ways of Leptospira bacteria infecting human cells and blood stream

When animals ingest the bacteria, they circulate in the bloodstream, then lodge themselves into the kidneys through the glomerular or peritubular capillaries. The bacteria then pass into the lumens of the renal tubules and colonise the brush border and proximal convoluted tubule. This causes the continuous shedding of bacteria in the urine without the animal experiencing significant ill effects. This relationship between the animal and the bacteria is known as a commensal relationship, and the animal is known as a reservoir host.

Humans are the accidental host of Leptospira. The pathogenesis of leptospirosis remains poorly understood despite research efforts. The bacteria enter the human body through a breach in the skin or the mucous membrane, then into the bloodstream. The bacteria later attach to the endothelial cells of the blood vessels and extracellular matrix (a complex network of proteins and carbohydrates present between cells). The bacteria use their flagella to move between cell layers. They bind to cells such as fibroblasts, macrophages, endothelial cells, and kidney epithelial cells. They also bind to several human proteins such as complement proteins, thrombin, fibrinogen, and plasminogen using surface leptospiral immunoglobulin-like (Lig) proteins such as LigB and LipL32, whose genes are found in all pathogenic species.

Through the innate immune system, endothelial cells of the capillaries in the human body are activated by the presence of these bacteria. The endothelial cells produce cytokines and antimicrobial peptides against the bacteria. These products regulate the coagulation cascade and movements of white blood cells. Macrophages presented in humans are able to engulf Leptospira. However, Leptospira can reside and proliferate in the cytoplasmic matrix after being ingested by macrophages. Those with severe leptospirosis can experience a high level of cytokines such as interleukin 6, tumour necrosis factor alpha (TNF-α), and interleukin 10. The high level of cytokines causes sepsis-like symptoms, which are life-threatening instead of helping to fight against the infection. Those who have a high risk of sepsis during a leptospirosis infection are found to have the HLA-DQ6 genotype, possibly due to superantigen activation, which damages bodily organs.

Leptospira LPS only activates toll-like receptor 2 (TLR2) in monocytes in humans. The lipid A molecule of the bacteria is not recognised by human TLR4 receptors. Therefore, the lack of Leptospira recognition by TLR4 receptors probably contributes to the leptospirosis disease process in humans.

Although various mechanisms in the human body fight against the bacteria, Leptospira is well adapted to such an inflammatory condition created by it. In the bloodstream, it can activate host plasminogen to become plasmin that breaks down extracellular matrix, degrades fibrin clots and complemental proteins (C3b and C5) to avoid opsonisation. It can also recruit complement regulators such as Factor H, C4b-binding protein, factor H-like binding protein, and vitronectin to prevent the activation of membrane attack complex on its surface. It also secretes proteases to degrade complement proteins such as C3. It can bind to thrombin, which decreases the fibrin formation. Reduced fibrin formation increases the risk of bleeding. Leptospira also secretes sphingomyelinase and haemolysin that target red blood cells.

Leptospira spreads rapidly to all organs through the bloodstream. They mainly affect the liver. They invade spaces between hepatocytes, causing apoptosis. The damaged hepatocytes and hepatocyte intercellular junctions cause bile leakage into the bloodstream, causing elevated levels of bilirubin, resulting in jaundice. Congested liver sinusoids and perisinusoidal spaces have been reported. Meanwhile, in the lungs, petechiae or frank bleeding can be found at the alveolar septum and spaces between alveoli. Leptospira secretes toxins that cause mild to severe kidney failure or interstitial nephritis. The kidney failure can recover completely or lead to atrophy and fibrosis. Rarely, inflammation of the heart muscles, coronary arteries, and aorta are found.

== Diagnosis ==
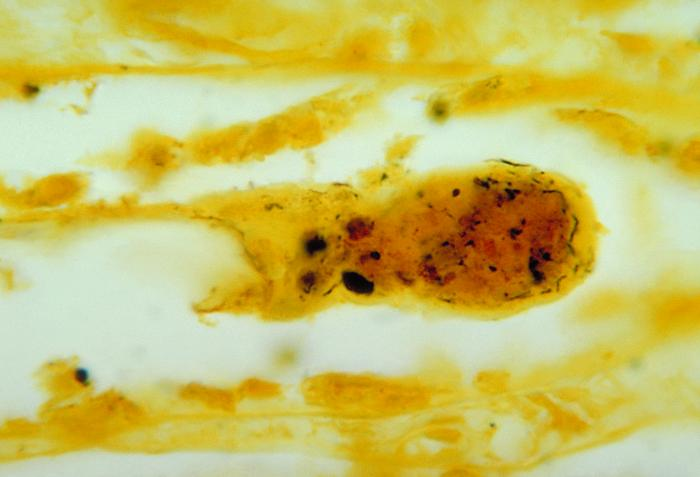
Kidney tissue, using a silver staining technique, revealing the presence of Leptospira bacteria

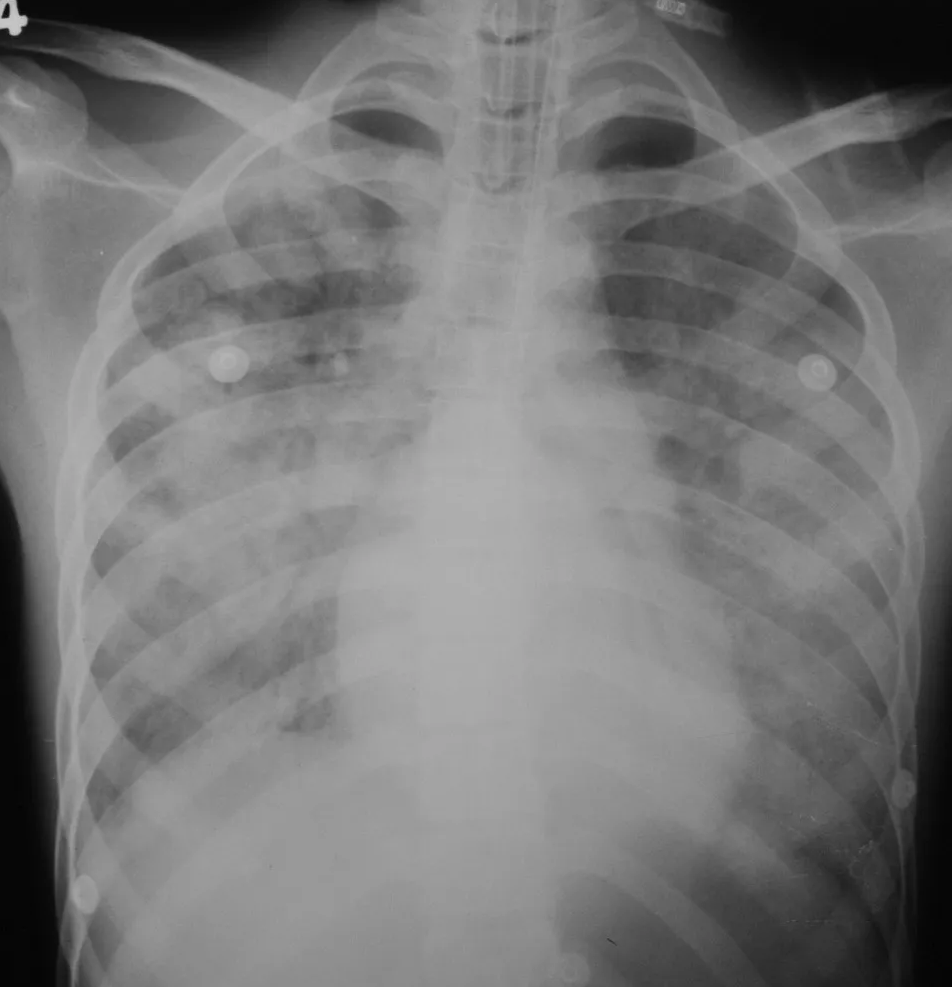
Diffuse lungs bleeding due to leptospirosis infection

=== Laboratory tests ===
For those who are infected, a complete blood count may show a high white cell count and a low platelet count. When a low haemoglobin count is present together with a low white cell count and thrombocytopenia, bone marrow suppression should be considered. Erythrocyte sedimentation rate and C-reactive protein may also be elevated.

The kidneys are commonly involved in leptospirosis. Blood urea and creatinine levels will be elevated. Leptospirosis increases potassium excretion in urine, which leads to a low potassium level and a low sodium level in the blood. Urinalysis may reveal the presence of protein, white blood cells, and microscopic haematuria. Because the bacteria settle in the kidneys, urine cultures will be positive for leptospirosis starting after the second week of illness until 30 days of infection.

For those with liver involvement, transaminases and direct bilirubin are elevated in liver function tests. The Icterohaemorrhagiae serogroup is associated with jaundice and elevated bilirubin levels. Hemolytic anaemia contributes to jaundice. A feature of leptospirosis is acute haemolytic anaemia and conjugated hyperbilirubinemia, especially in patients with glucose-6-phosphate dehydrogenase deficiency. Abnormal serum amylase and lipase levels (associated with pancreatitis) are found in those who are admitted to hospital due to leptospirosis. Impaired kidney function with creatinine clearance less than 50 ml/min is associated with elevated pancreatic enzymes.

For those with severe headaches who show signs of meningitis, a lumbar puncture can be attempted. If infected, cerebrospinal fluid (CSF) examination shows lymphocytic predominance with a cell count of about 500/mm^{3}, protein between 50 and 100 mg/mL and normal glucose levels. These findings are consistent with aseptic meningitis.

==== Serological tests ====
Rapid detection of Leptospira can be done by quantifying the IgM antibodies using an enzyme-linked immunosorbent assay (ELISA). Typically, L. biflexa antigen is used to detect the IgM antibodies. This test can quickly determine the diagnosis and help in early treatment. However, the test specificity depends upon the type of antigen used and the presence of antibodies from previous infections. The presence of other diseases such as Epstein–Barr virus infection, viral hepatitis, and cytomegalovirus infection can cause false-positive results. Other rapid screening tests have been developed such as dipsticks, latex, and slide agglutination tests.

The microscopic agglutination test (MAT) is the reference test for the diagnosis of leptospirosis. MAT is a test where serial dilutions of patient sera are mixed with different serovars of Leptospira. The mixture is then examined under a dark field microscope to look for agglutination. The highest dilution where 50% agglutination occurs is the result. MAT titres of 1:100 to 1:800 are diagnostic of leptospirosis. A fourfold or greater rise in titre of two sera taken at symptoms' onset and three to 10 days of disease onset confirms the diagnosis. During the acute phase of the disease, MAT is not specific in detecting a serotype of Leptospira because of cross-reactivity between the serovars. In the convalescent phase, MAT is more specific in detecting the serovar types. MAT requires a panel of live antigens and requires laborious work.

==== Molecular tests ====
Leptospiral DNA can be amplified by using polymerase chain reaction (PCR) from serum, urine, aqueous humour, CSF, and autopsy specimens. It detects the presence of bacteria faster than MAT during the first few days of infection without waiting for the appearance of antibodies. As PCR detects the presence of leptospiral DNA in the blood it is useful even when the bacteria are killed by antibiotics.

=== Imaging ===
In those who have lung involvement, a chest X-ray may demonstrate diffuse alveolar opacities.

=== Diagnostic criteria ===
In 1982, the World Health Organization (WHO) proposed the Faine's criteria for the diagnosis of leptospirosis. It consists of three parts: A (clinical findings), B (epidemiological factors), and C (lab findings and bacteriological data). Since the original Faine's criteria only included culture and MAT in part C, which is difficult and complex to perform, the modified Faine's criteria were proposed in 2004 to include ELISA and slide agglutination tests, which are easier to perform. In 2012, modified Faine's criteria (with amendment) were proposed to include shortness of breath and coughing up blood in the diagnosis. In 2013, India recommended modifying Faine's criteria in the diagnosis of leptospirosis.

== Prevention ==
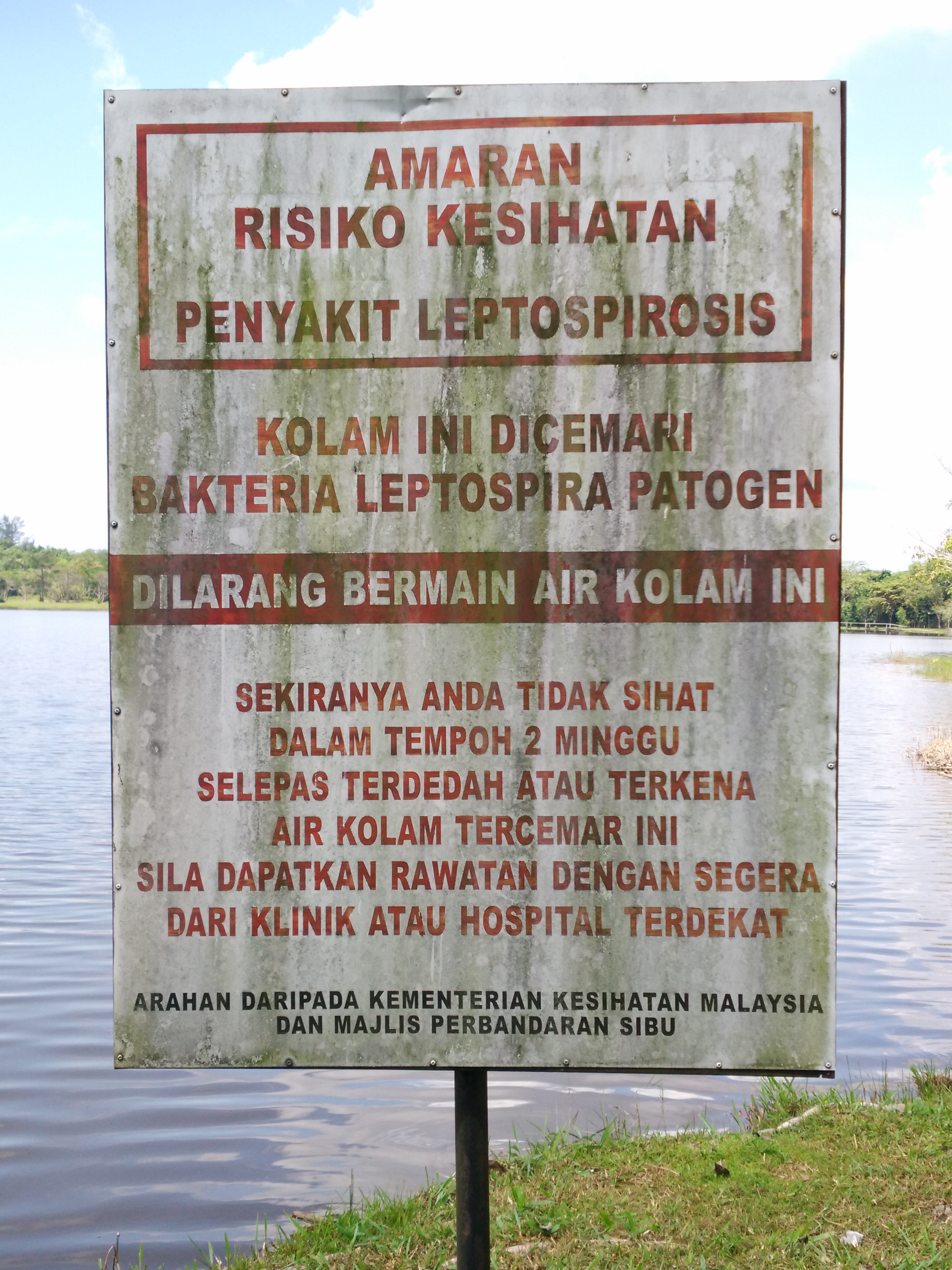
A notice board by a lakeside in Sarawak, Malaysia, that warns against swimming in the lake as it has tested positive for pathogenic Leptospira

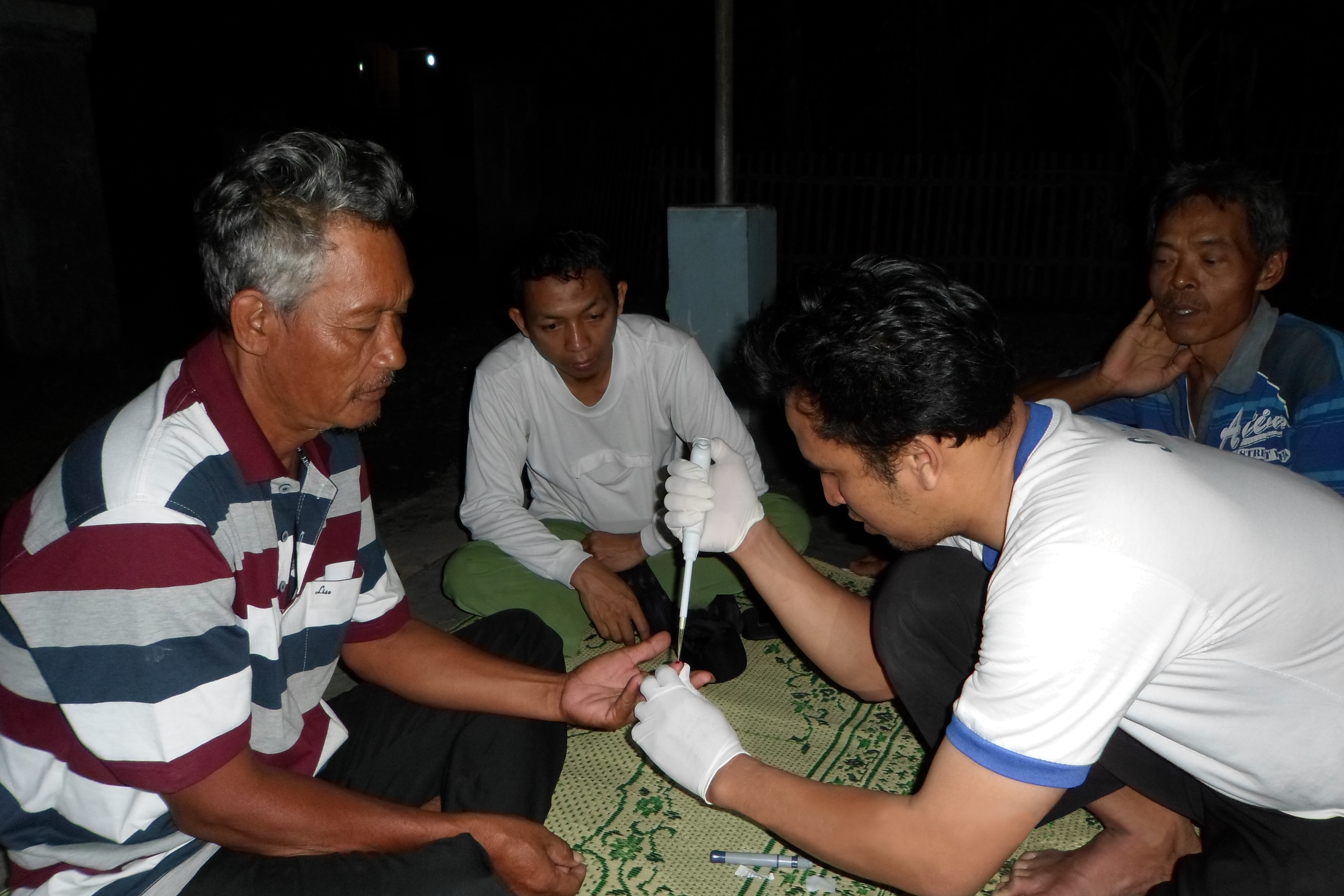
Blood samples being taken from a group of residents in Boyolali Regency, Indonesia, for leptospirosis screening tests

Rates of leptospirosis can be reduced by improving housing, infrastructure, and sanitation standards. Rodent abatement efforts and flood mitigation projects can also help to prevent it. Proper use of personal protective equipment (PPE) by people who have a high risk of occupational exposure can prevent leptospirosis infections in most cases.

There is no human vaccine suitable for worldwide use. Only a few countries, such as Cuba, Japan, France, and China, have approved inactivated vaccines with limited protective effects. Side effects such as nausea, injection site redness and swelling have been reported after the vaccine was injected. Since the immunity induced by one Leptospiraserovar is only protective against that specific one, trivalent vaccines have been developed. They do not confer long-lasting immunity to humans or animals. Vaccines for other animals are more widely available. Vaccination of livestock and domestic animals, particularly dogs and cattle, is an effective measure in preventing both animal illness and zoonotic transmission to humans.

Doxycycline is given once a week as a prophylaxis and is effective in reducing the rate of leptospirosis infections amongst high-risk individuals in flood-prone areas. In one study, it reduced the number of leptospirosis cases in military personnel undergoing exercises in the jungles. In another study, it reduced the number of symptomatic cases after exposure to leptospirosis under heavy rainfall in endemic areas.

== Treatment ==
Most leptospiral cases resolve spontaneously. Early initiation of antibiotics may prevent the progression to severe disease. Therefore, in resource-limited settings, antibiotics can be started once leptospirosis is suspected after history taking and examination.

For mild leptospirosis, antibiotic recommendations such as doxycycline, azithromycin, ampicillin, and amoxicillin were based solely on in vitro testing. In 2001, the WHO recommended oral doxycycline (2 mg/kg up to 100 mg every 12 hours) for five to seven days for those with mild leptospirosis. Tetracycline, ampicillin, and amoxicillin can also be used in such cases. However, in areas where both rickettsia and leptospirosis are endemic, azithromycin and doxycycline are the drugs of choice. Doxycycline is not used in cases where the patient suffers from liver damage as it has been linked to hepatotoxicity.

Based on a 1988 study, intravenous (IV) benzylpenicillin (also known as penicillin G) is recommended for the treatment of severe leptospirosis. Intravenous benzylpenicillin (30 mg/kg up to 1.2 g every six hours) is used for five to seven days. Amoxicillin, ampicillin, and erythromycin may also be used for severe cases. Ceftriaxone (1 g IV every 24 hours for seven days) is also effective for severe leptospirosis. Cefotaxime (1 g IV every six hours for seven days) and doxycycline (200 mg initially followed by 100 mg IV every 12 hours for seven days) are equally effective as benzylpenicillin (1.5 million units IV every six hours for seven days). Therefore, there is no evidence on differences in death reduction when benzylpenicillin is compared with ceftriaxone or cefotaxime. Another study conducted in 2007 also showed no difference in efficacy between doxycycline (200 mg initially followed by 100 mg orally every 12 hours for seven days) or azithromycin (2 g on day one followed by 1 g daily for two more days) for suspected leptospirosis. There was no difference in the resolution of fever, and azithromycin is better tolerated than doxycycline.

Outpatients are given doxycycline or azithromycin. Doxycycline can shorten the duration of leptospirosis by two days, improve symptoms, and prevent the shedding of organisms in their urine. Azithromycin and amoxicillin are given to pregnant women and children. Rarely, a Jarisch–Herxheimer reaction can develop in the first few hours after antibiotic administration. However, according to a meta-analysis done in 2012, the benefit of antibiotics in the treatment of leptospirosis was unclear, although the use of antibiotics may reduce the duration of illness by two to four days. Another meta-analysis done in 2013 reached a similar conclusion.

For those with severe leptospirosis, including potassium wasting with high kidney output dysfunction, intravenous hydration and potassium supplements can prevent dehydration and hypokalemia. When acute kidney failure occurs, early initiation of haemodialysis or peritoneal dialysis can help to improve survival. For those with respiratory failure, tracheal intubation with low tidal volume improves survival rates.

Corticosteroids have been proposed to suppress inflammation in leptospirosis because Leptospira infection can induce the release of chemical signals which promote inflammation of blood vessels in the lungs. However, there is insufficient evidence to determine whether the use of corticosteroids is beneficial.

== Prognosis ==
The overall risk of death for leptospirosis is 5–10%. For those with jaundice, the case fatality can increase up to 15%. For those infected who present with confusion and neurological signs, there is a high risk of death. Other factors that increase the risk of death include reduced urine output, age more than 36 years, and respiratory failure. With proper care, most of those infected will recover completely. Those with acute kidney failure may develop persistent mild kidney impairment after they recover. In those with severe lung involvement, the risk of death is 50–70%. Thirty percent of people with acute leptospirosis complained of long-lasting symptoms characterised by weakness, muscle pain, and headaches.

=== Eye complications ===
Eye problems can occur in 10% of those who recovered from leptospirosis in the range from two weeks to a few years post-infection. Most commonly, eye complications can occur at six months after the infection. This is due to the immune privilege of the eye, which protects it from immunological damage during the initial phase of leptospiral infection. These complications can range from mild anterior uveitis to severe panuveitis (which involves all three vascular layers of the eye). The uveitis more commonly happens in young to middle-aged males and those working in agricultural farming. In up to 80% of those infected, Leptospira DNA can be found in the aqueous humour of the eye. Eye problems usually have a good prognosis following treatment or are self-limiting. In anterior uveitis, only topical steroids and mydriatics (an agent that causes dilation of the pupil) are needed while in panuveitis, it requires periocular corticosteroids. Leptospiral uveitis is characterised by hypopyon, rapidly maturing cataract, free floating vitreous membranes, disc hyperemia and retinal vasculitis.

== Epidemiology ==
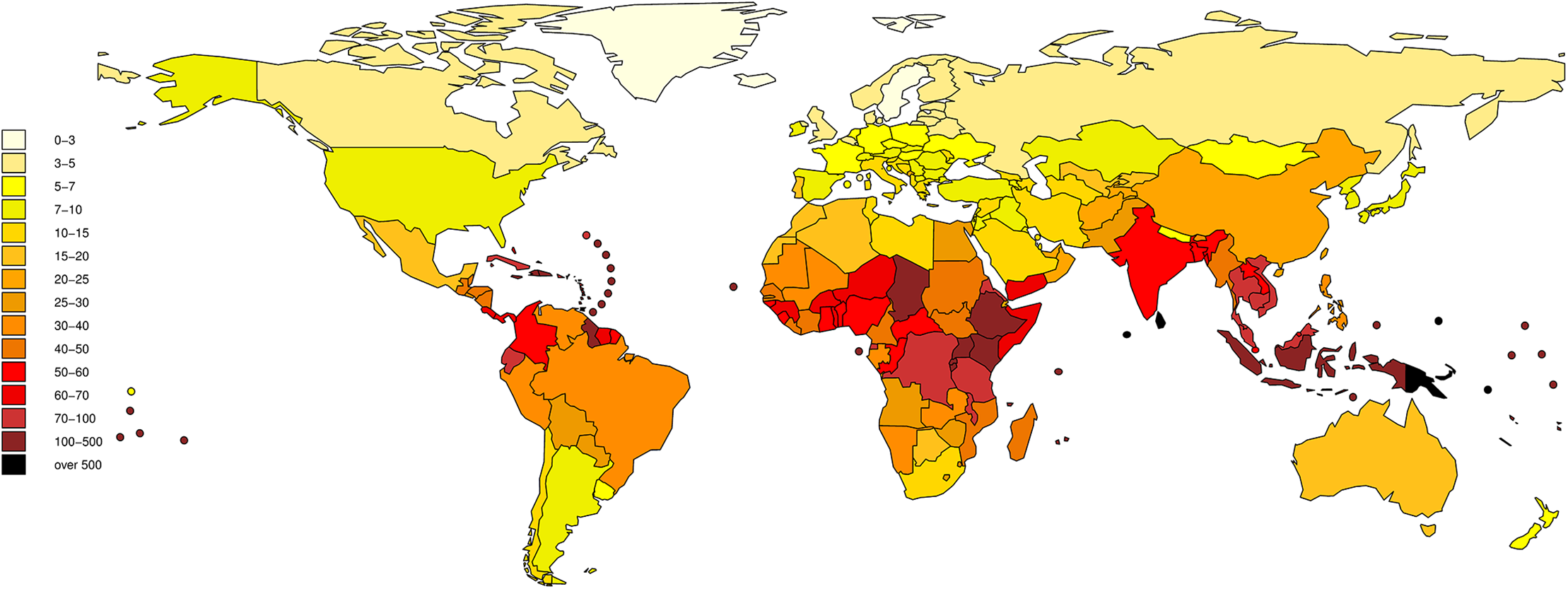
Global burden of leptospirosis calculated as disability-adjusted life year (DALY) lost per 100,000 people per year

It is estimated that one million severe cases of leptospirosis occur annually, with 58,900 deaths, with the highest disease burden occurring in tropical and subtropical regions, particularly in South and Southeast Asia, Latin America, and parts of Africa. Severe cases account for 5–15% of all leptospirosis cases. The disease is observed persistently in parts of Asia, Oceania, the Caribbean, Latin America and Africa. In the United States, there were 100 to 150 leptospirosis cases annually. About 50% of the reported cases occurred in Puerto Rico. Leptospirosis is found in both urban and rural areas in tropical, subtropical, and temperate regions. Human infection risk is increased by environmental conditions including flooding, poor sanitation, inadequate waste management, and urban overcrowding, especially in tropical and subtropical regions. The global health burden for leptospirosis can be measured by disability-adjusted life year (DALY). The score is 42 per 100,000 people per year, which is more than other diseases such as rabies and filariasis. The global rates of leptospirosis have been underestimated because most affected countries lack notification, or notification is not mandatory. Distinguishing clinical signs of leptospirosis from other diseases and lack of laboratory diagnostic services are other problems. The socioeconomic status of many of the world's population is closely tied to malnutrition; subsequent lack of micronutrients such as iron, calcium, and magnesium may lead to increased risk of infection and death due to leptospirosis infection.

The convergence of climate change impacts—such as rising temperatures, flooding and natural disasters, mass migration, poverty, and public health challenges—with insufficient health and sanitation infrastructure heightens the risk of leptospirosis. Urban poor populations in densely populated cities are at particularly high risk due to limited access to sanitation and exposure to contaminated floodwaters. In countries such as Brazil, India, and the Philippines, outbreaks often follow heavy rainfall and flooding events.

Leptospirosis is considered a neglected tropical disease (NTD), and its incidence may be significantly underreported due to diagnostic challenges and low awareness among healthcare providers.

The disease burden is higher among populations in low- and middle-income countries, where environmental factors and poor hygiene contribute to its spread and transmission.

=== Public health interventions ===
Leptospirosis is widely recognised as a One Health issue because transmission is shaped by interactions among humans, animals, and the environment. Effective control of leptospirosis requires coordinated public health strategies that integrate human, animal, and environmental health approaches. Surveillance systems are essential for early detection of outbreaks, particularly in regions prone to flooding and extreme weather events. Integrated pest management, including rodent control programs and improved waste management, plays a critical role in reducing environmental contamination.

Community-based interventions, such as health education and improved sanitation infrastructure, are also important in reducing exposure risk, especially in low-income urban settings. In addition, collaboration between veterinary and public health sectors enables vaccination of livestock and domestic animals, reducing transmission at the human-animal interface. These combined strategies reflect the application of the One Health approach in preventing and controlling leptospirosis.

Environmental factors such as heavy rainfall, flooding, and poor sanitation significantly increased the risk of leptospirosis transmission by allowing the spread of contaminated water. Additionally, urbanization and inadequate waste management promote the growth of rodent populations, which act as primary reservoirs for the bacteria.

Climate change is associated with a higher incidence of leptospirosis because extreme weather events create a suitable environment for outbreaks. The One Health approach highlights the significance of coordinated efforts among human health, veterinary health, and environmental health, and environmental management sectors to prevent and control the disease.

Leptospirosis disproportionately affects populations in environments where exposure is unavoidable, particularly in regions with inadequate drainage, poor sanitation, and frequent flooding. In these environments, individuals are routinely exposed to contaminated soil and water, which increases infection risk. These patterns underscore the role of environmental conditions and structural inequalities in shaping disease distribution.

== History ==
The disease was first described by Adolf Weil in 1886 when he reported an "acute infectious disease with enlargement of spleen, jaundice, and nephritis." Before Weil's description, the disease was known as "rice field jaundice" in ancient Chinese text, "autumn fever", "seven-day fever", and "nanukayami fever" in Japan; in Europe and Australia, the disease was associated with certain occupations and given names such as "cane-cutter's disease", "swine-herd's disease", and "Schlammfieber" (mud fever). It has been known historically as "black jaundice", or "dairy farm fever" in New Zealand. Leptospirosis was postulated as the cause of an epidemic among Native Americans along the coast of what is now New England during 1616–1619. The disease was most likely brought to the New World by Europeans.

Leptospira was first observed in 1907 in a post mortem kidney tissue slice by Arthur Stimson using silver deposition staining technique. He called the organism Spirocheta interrogans because the bacteria resembled a question mark. In 1908, a Japanese research group led by Ryukichi Inada and Yutaka Ito first identified this bacterium as the causative agent of leptospirosis and noted its presence in rats in 1916. Japanese coal mine workers frequently contracted leptospirosis. In Japan, the organism was named Spirocheta icterohaemorrhagiae. The Japanese group also experimented with the first leptospiral immunisation studies in guinea pigs. They demonstrated that by injecting the infected guinea pigs with sera from convalescent humans or goats, passive immunity could be provided to the guinea pigs. In 1917, the Japanese group discovered rats as the carriers of leptospirosis. Unaware of the Japanese group's work, two German groups independently and almost simultaneously published their first demonstration of transmitting leptospiral infection in guinea pigs in October 1915. They named the organism Spirochaeta nodosa and Spirochaeta Icterogenes respectively. In 1917, Hideyo Noguchi conducted a study to find whether if the jaundice, specifically in the context of Weil's disease, which often spreads through the urine of the infected rats, is found in the bodies of American rats as it does in European and Japanese rats. During his research, he later suggested the name of the new genus Leptospira meaning slim spiral that it falls under.

Leptospirosis was subsequently recognised as a disease of all mammalian species. In 1933, Dutch workers reported the isolation of Leptospira canicola, which specifically infects dogs. In 1940, the strain that specifically infects cattle was first reported in Russia. In 1942, soldiers at Fort Bragg, North Carolina, were recorded to have an infectious disease which caused a rash over their shinbones. This disease was later known to be caused by leptospirosis. By the 1950s, the number of serovars that infected various mammals had expanded significantly. In the 1980s, leptospirosis was recognised as a veterinary disease of major economic importance.

In 1982, there were about 200 serovars of Leptospira available for classification. The International Committee on Systematic Bacteriology's subcommittee on taxonomy of Leptospira proposed classifying these serovars into two big groups: L. interrogans containing pathogenic serovars and L. biflexa containing saprophytic serovars. In 1979, the leptospiral family of Leptospiraceae was proposed. In the same year, Leptospira illini was reclassified as the new genus Leptonema. In 2002, "Lepthangamushi syndrome" was coined to describe a series of overlapping symptoms of leptospirosis with Hantavirus hemorrhagic fever with renal syndrome, and scrub typhus caused by Orientia tsutsugamushi. In 2005, Leptospira parva was classified as Turneriella. With DNA–DNA hybridisation technology, L. interrogans was divided into seven species. More Leptospira species have been discovered since then. The WHO established the Leptospirosis Burden Epidemiology Reference Group (LERG) to review the latest disease epidemiological data of leptospirosis, formulate a disease transmission model, and identify gaps in knowledge and research. The first meeting was convened in 2009. In 2011, LERG estimated that the global yearly rate of leptospirosis is five to 14 cases per 100,000 population.

== Other animals ==
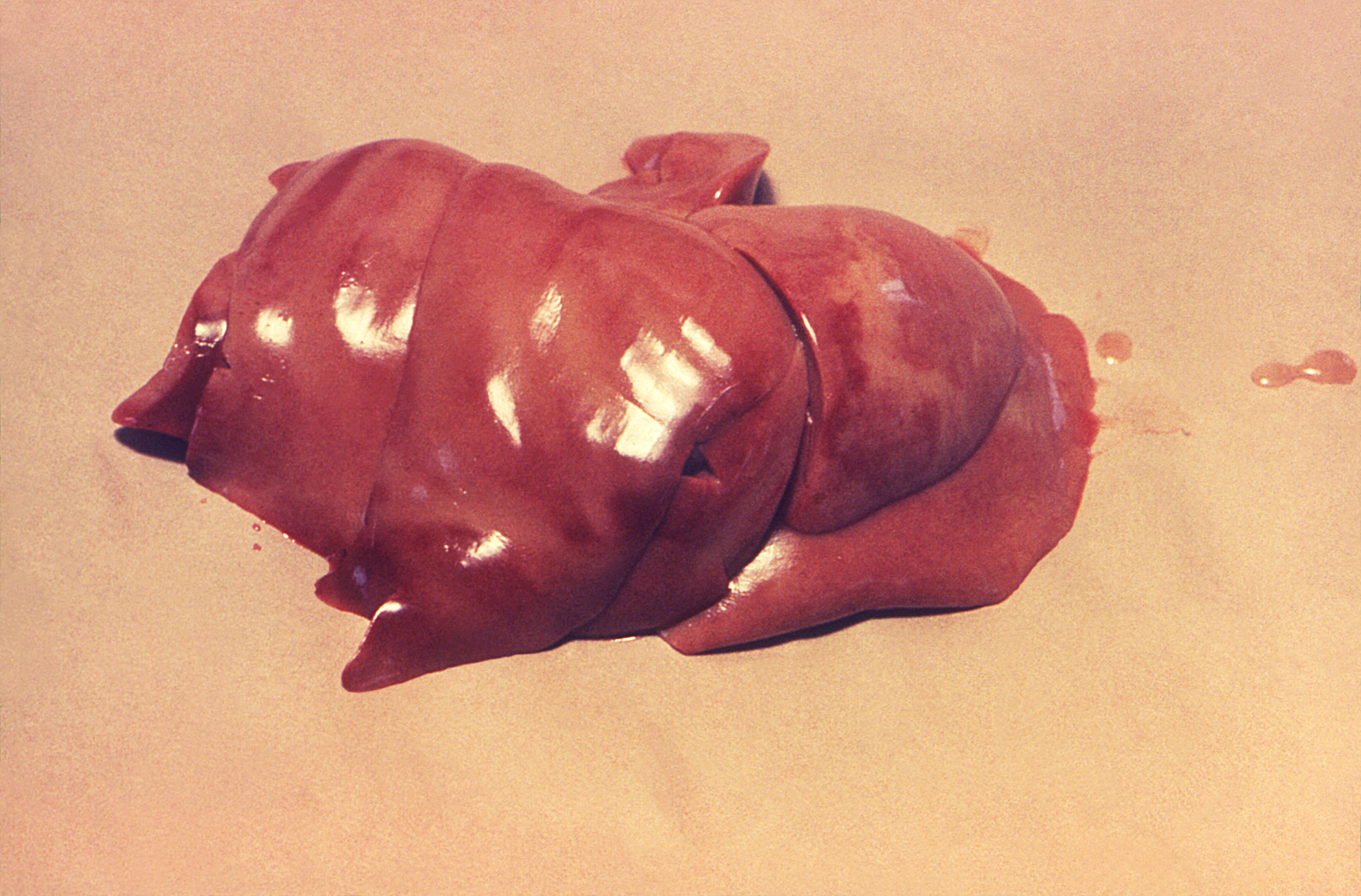
Liver of an unknown animal with multiple blackish necrotic patches secondary to leptospirosis infection

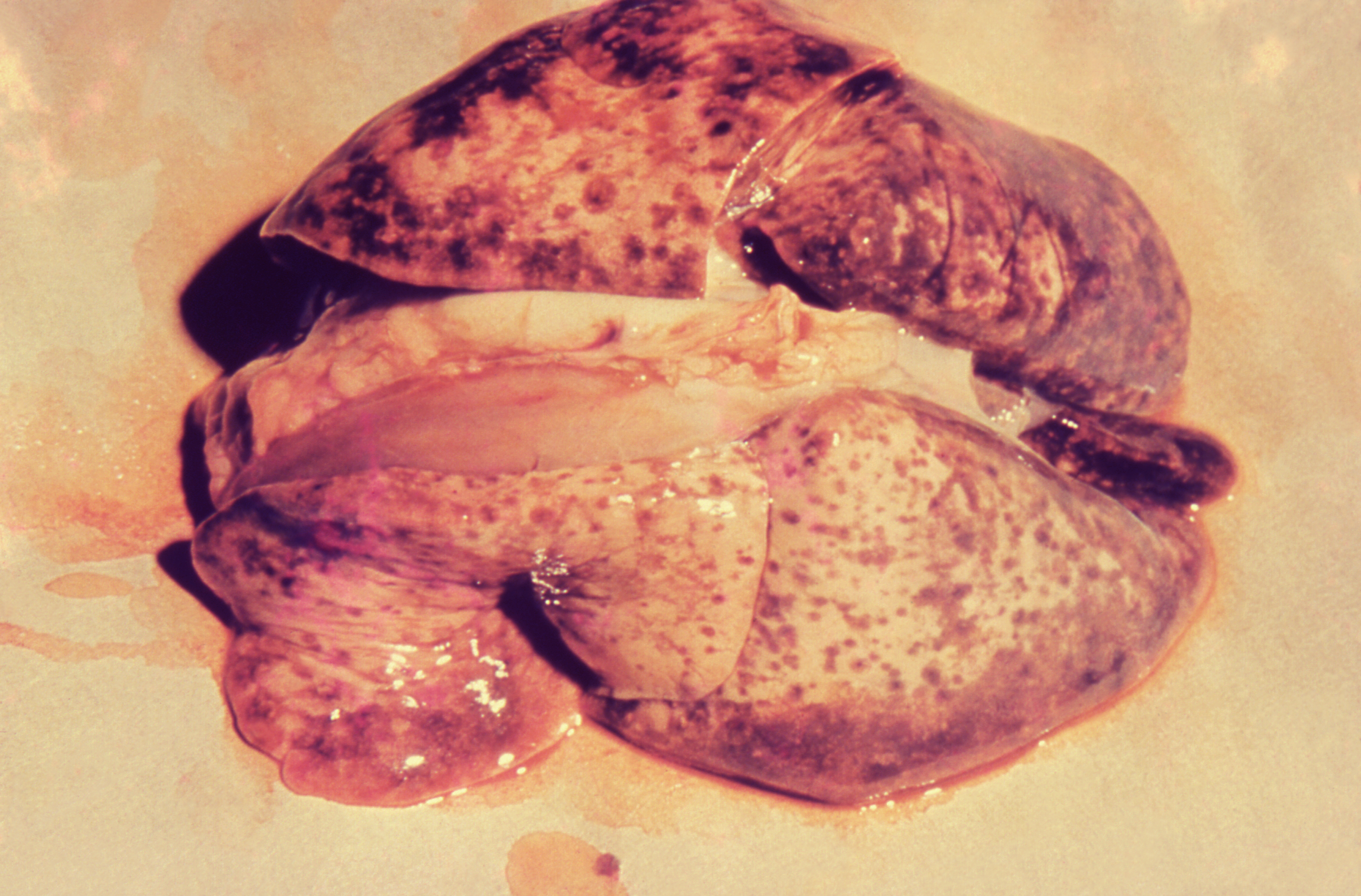
Lungs of a canine with multiple bleeding spots due to leptospirosis

Infected animals can have no, mild, or severe symptoms; the presenting symptoms may vary by the type of animal. In some animals, the bacteria live in the reproductive tract, leading to transmission during mating.

Animals also present with similar clinical features when compared to humans. Clinical signs can appear in 5–15 days in dogs. The incubation period can be prolonged in cats. Leptospirosis can cause abortions after 2–12 weeks in cattle, and 1–4 weeks of infection in pigs. The illness tends to be milder in reservoir hosts. The most commonly affected organs are the kidneys, liver, and reproductive system, but other organs can be affected. In dogs, the acute clinical signs include fever, loss of appetite, shivering, muscle pain, weakness, and urinary symptoms. Vomiting, diarrhoea, and abdominal pain may also be present. Petechiae and ecchymoses may be seen on mucous membranes. Bleeding from the lungs may also be seen in dogs. In chronic presentations, the affected dog may have no symptoms. In animals that have died of leptospirosis, their kidneys may be swollen with grey and white spots, mottling, or scarring. Their liver may be enlarged with areas of cell death. Petechiae and ecchymoses may be found in various organs. Inflammation of the blood vessels, inflammation of the heart, meningeal layers covering the brain and spinal cord, and uveitis are also possible. Equine recurrent uveitis (ERU) is the most common disease associated with Leptospira infection in horses in North America and may lead to blindness. ERU is an autoimmune disease involving antibodies against Leptospira proteins LruA and LruB cross-reacting with eye proteins. Live Leptospira can be recovered from the aqueous or vitreous fluid of many horses with Leptospira-associated ERU. Risk of death or disability in infected animals varies depending upon the species and age of the animals. In adult pigs and cattle, reproductive signs are the most common signs of leptospirosis. Up to 40% of cows may have a spontaneous abortion. Younger animals usually develop more severe disease. About 80% of dogs can survive with treatment, but the survival rate is reduced if the lungs are involved.

ELISA and microscopic agglutination tests are most commonly used to diagnose leptospirosis in animals. The bacteria can be detected in blood, urine, and milk or liver, kidney, or other tissue samples by using immunofluorescence or immunohistochemical or polymerase chain reaction techniques. Silver staining or immunogold silver staining is used to detect Leptospira in tissue sections. The organisms stain poorly with Gram stain. Dark-field microscopy can be used to detect Leptospira in body fluids, but it is neither sensitive nor specific in detecting the organism. A positive culture for leptospirosis is definitive, but the availability is limited, and culture results can take 13–26 weeks for a result, limiting its utility. Paired acute and convalescent samples are preferred for serological diagnosis of leptospirosis in animals. A positive serological sample from an aborted fetus is also diagnostic of leptospirosis.

Various antibiotics such as doxycycline, penicillins, dihydrostreptomycin, and streptomycin have been used to treat leptospirosis in animals. Fluid therapy, blood transfusion, and respiratory support may be required in severe disease. For horses with ERU, the primary treatment is with anti-inflammatory drugs.

Leptospirosis vaccines are available for animals such as pigs, dogs, cattle, sheep, and goats. Vaccines for cattle usually contain Leptospira serovar Hardjo and Pomona, for dogs, the vaccines usually contain serovar Icterohaemorrhagiae and Canicola. Vaccines containing multiple serovars do not work for cattle as well as vaccines containing a single serovar, yet the multivalent vaccines continue to be sold. Isolation of infected animals and prophylactic antibiotics are also effective in preventing leptospirosis transmission between animals. Environmental control and sanitation also reduce transmission rates.
