= Amur virus =

Virus classification
- (unranked): Virus
- Realm: Riboviria
- Kingdom: Orthornavirae
- Phylum: Negarnaviricota
- Class: Bunyaviricetes
- Order: Elliovirales
- Family: Hantaviridae
- Genus: Orthohantavirus (?)
- Virus: Amur virus

Synonyms
- Soochong virus

Species of virus

Amur virus (AMRV) is a zoonotic negative-sense single-stranded RNA virus. It may be a member of the genus Orthohantavirus, but it has not been definitively classified as a species and may only be a strain. It has been identified as a causative agent of hemorrhagic fever with renal syndrome.

== Genome ==
The complete genome sequence Amur virus has been isolated from a sample obtained from Apodemus peninsulae in Northeastern China. AMRV strains from China and Far East and Soochong virus (SOOV) (especially SOO-1/2 strains from Northeastern Korea) were found to share high identities of nucleotide sequences and were monophyletic distinct from Apodemus agrarius HTNV. Two genetic sublineages of SOOV exist, but findings suggest that AMRV and SOOV are different strains of the same hantavirus.

== Reservoir ==
The virus is reported to be carried by Korean field mice (Apodemus peninsulae) in the Far East of Russia, China, and Korea.

== See also ==
- Hantaviruses
- Viral hemorrhagic fever
- Pulmonary-renal syndrome
- RNA virus
- Murinae
