= Ammer =

Ammer may refer to:

- Amper, or called Ammer, is a river in Bavaria.
- Ammer (Neckar), a small river in Baden-Württemberg, Germany, tributary of the Neckar
- The upper course of the river Amper in Bavaria, Germany
- Thomas Ammer (1937–2024), German historian, imprisonment in 1958 for Anti-government political activism in East Germany
- Stefan Ammer (born 1942), German-Australian pianist, lecturer, teacher and professor of music
