= Krasnoyarka, Ust-Koksinskoye Rural Settlement, Ust-Koksinsky District, Altai Republic =

Krasnoyarka Красноярка
- Selo
- Location within Altai Republic Location within Russia
- Coordinates: 50°18′N 85°16′E
- Country: Russia
- Region: Altai Republic
- District: Ust-Koksinsky District
- Time zone: UTC+7:00

Krasnoyarka (Russian: Красноярка; Altay: Кызыл-Jар, Kızıl-Ĵar) is a rural locality (a selo) in Ust-Koksinsky District, the Altai Republic, Russia. The population was 1 as of 2016. There is 1 street.
