= Amur and Timur =

Tiger-goat friendship

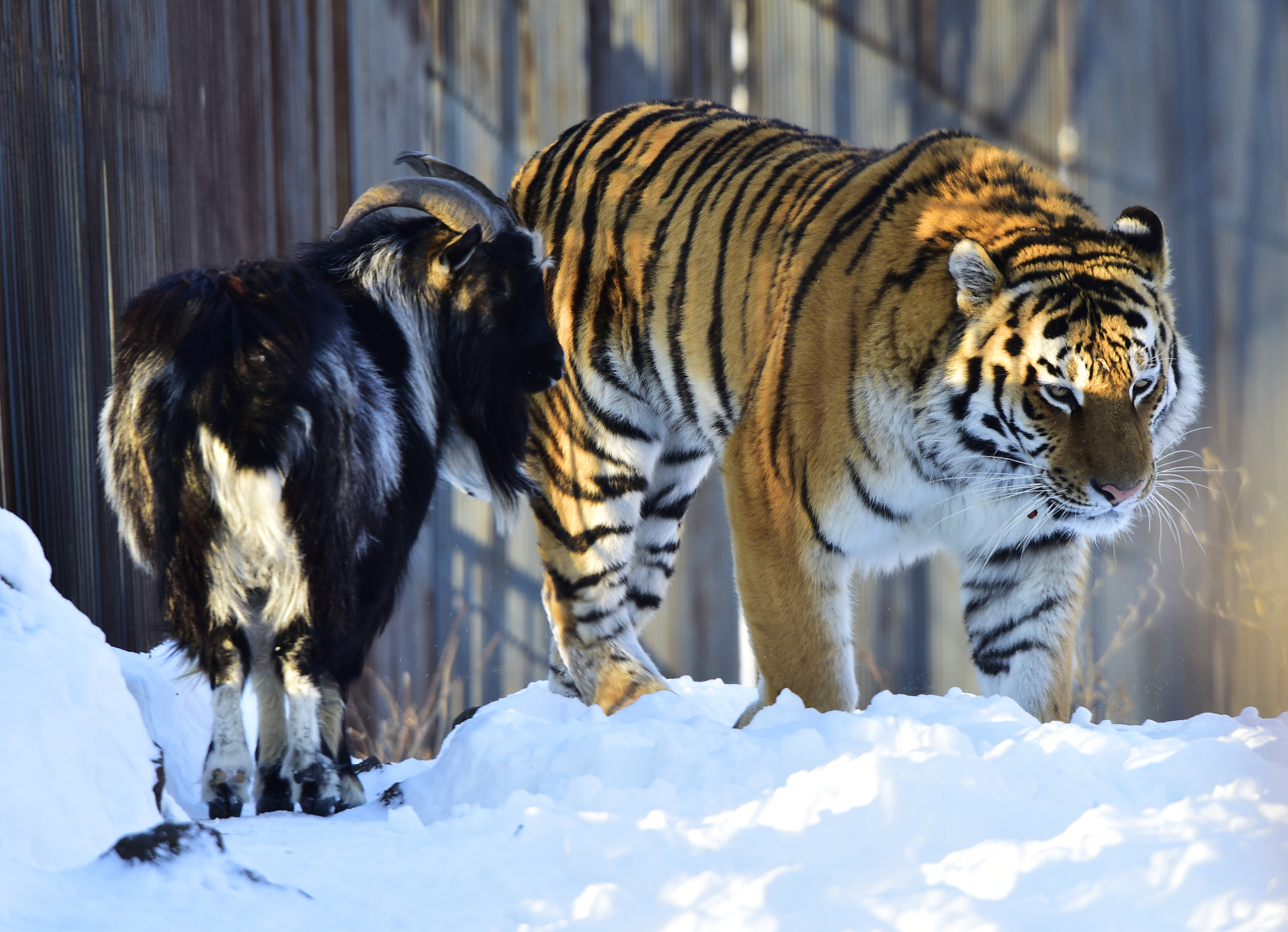
Timur (left) and Amur (right)

Amur and Timur (Russian: Амур и Тимур) are, respectively, a Siberian tiger and a goat who established an unlikely interspecies friendship in a safari park in Primorye in the Far East of Russia. In 2015, Timur was placed in Amur's enclosure as food but, by his confident behavior, established a rapport with Amur, who did not eat him. In 2016, the pair were separated after a fight and Timur was moved to the Exhibition of Achievements of National Economy (VDNKh) in Moscow. Timur died on November 5, 2019, aged 5, despite the average goat life expectancy ranging between 15 and 18 years.

== Pedigree ==
For a long time, nothing was known about the goat's past. Timur previously had another name – Baron. On November 2, 2015, Timur was sold by his owner to the safari park. Timur is presumed to be the father of seven kids.

Amur's grandfather, Almaz, lived in the zoological center of the Institute of Biology and Soil Science of the Far Eastern Branch of the Russian Academy of Sciences in the village of Gayvoron, Spassky District, and was the last representative of his species in this center. He died in the autumn of 2015. Amur's father, Barkhat, was born on May 8, 2003, at the zoological center of the Institute of Biology and Soil Science in Gayvoron. His mother, Rigma, was born in the wild and was found on November 16, 2006, at the age of four months. Both are kept in the Priamursky Zoo in Khabarovsk. Amur has a sister, Taiga, and a brother, Bartek, who were born on April 2, 2012 at Priamursky Zoo. They also have an older brother, Agat, who now lives at Perm Zoo in Amurka.

In early November 2012, Amur and Taiga were moved to the Shkotovsky Safari Park as part of the Eurasian Association of Zoos and Aquaria's Siberian tiger breeding program, while Bartek arrived at Royev Ruchey Zoo on March 19, 2013.

== The beginning of the friendship ==
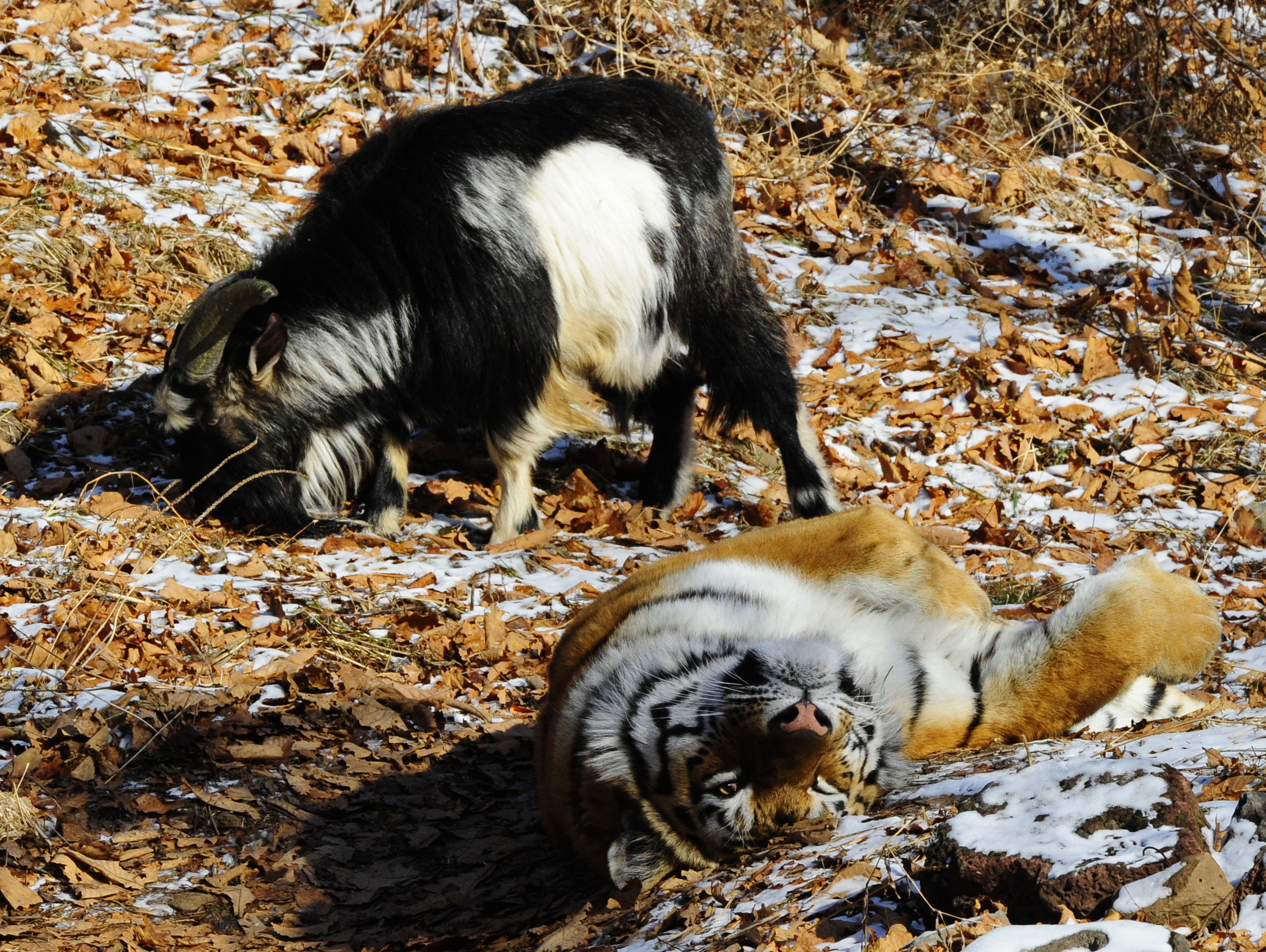
Amur and Timur on November 27, 2015

The friendship between Amur and Timur began at the Primosky Safari Park in November 2015, when a goat (who was nameless at the time) was given to the tiger, Amur to be eaten. The goat was released into the enclosure, but when the tiger approached, the goat tried to fight back by pointing its horns forward. Since the tiger in the park was fed several times a day, Amur was likely not too hungry at that moment. Perhaps, for this reason, the tiger abandoned its attempts to attack the goat. For its fearless behavior, the goat was named Timur. Over time, Timur occupied Amur's shelter; he began to sleep in his spot and, after a while, Amur had to give up his place and move to the roof of his shelter. After these events, the animals started living in the same enclosure (while the tiger continued to be fed as usual). A few days later, it was decided not to remove the goat from the tiger's enclosure, as its life was not in danger. According to the safari park's director, Dmitry Mezentsev:

"We have an enclosure for goats, they are cowardly, and their fate is to be eaten by predators, but Timur has his own destiny; with his courage, he showed that he deserves to live with the tiger, so he will stay here. We are not afraid for the goat's life, because if Amur wanted to eat him, he would have done so long ago—he is a large, strong predator and has dealt with prey much larger than Timur".

After some time, the animals began to walk together, sleep in the same place, and sometimes, eat together. Then they started playing together, including running and playing with a ball. Due to this unusual phenomenon, the event, which became known as the "Friendship of Amur and Timur," leaked onto the internet and subsequently attracted nationwide attention.

== Further events ==
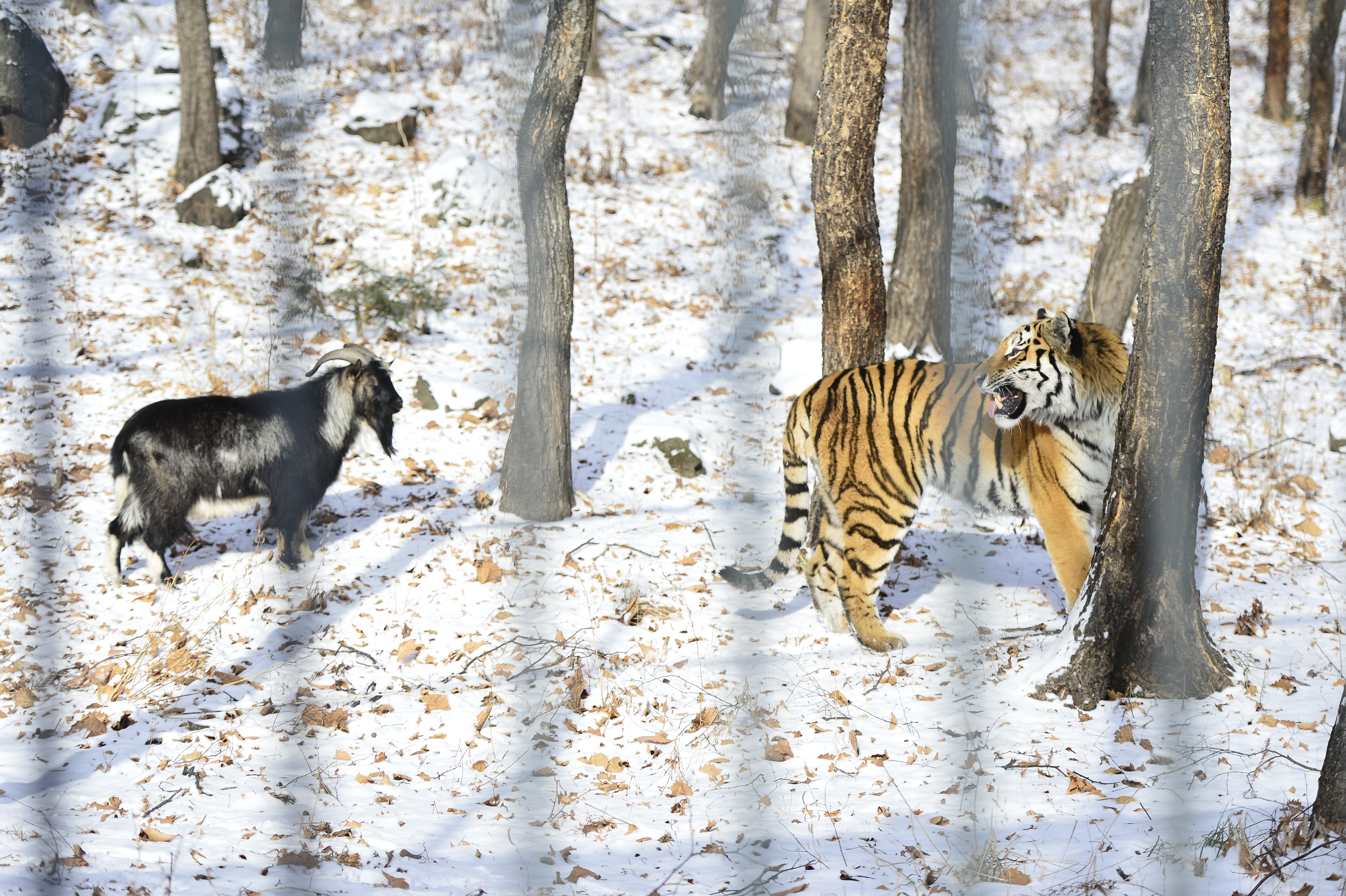
Amur and Timur on December 6, 2015

The story of Amur and Timur became very popular, mainly due to the touching nature of their friendship. Nevertheless, within a week, the safari park's website received numerous letters requesting that the tiger and the goat be separated. The Russian branch of the WWF also expressed its concern for Timur's safety.

Meanwhile, the friendship between Amur and Timur grew stronger, and their popularity increased. At the suggestion of visitors to the safari park, a charitable account was opened for the tiger and the goat. Official groups for Amur and Timur were created on the social networks VKontakte and Odnoklassniki, and an account was opened for them on Instagram. The safari park's website began a live stream of the tiger and goat's life. It became so popular that on December 30, 2015, the site crashed due to a massive influx of visitors.

In October 2015, the safari park management brought a tigress named Ussuri from Moscow for Amur. There were plans to mate her with Amur once the tigress reached reproductive age. During this time, Timur would be temporarily moved out due to the danger of being attacked by the tigress. After the two tigers mated, the tigress would be moved to a separate enclosure.

On January 26, 2016, a conflict occurred between the animals: Amur grabbed Timur by the scruff of the neck and threw him down a slope, after which the goat required veterinary care and assistance. The cause was presumed to be Timur's behavior, which had been irritating the tiger. After Timur's treatment, it was decided not to keep him in Amur's enclosure anymore, and they were only allowed to see each other under the supervision of park staff.

On November 8, 2019, Timur's caretaker, Elvira Golovina, announced on the Primorsky Safari Park website that the goat had died on November 5, 2019.

=== Reason for the phenomenon ===
There are various explanations for the friendship between Amur and Timur.

According to Sergey Aramilev, director of the Primorsky branch of the non-profit Amur Tiger Center, the tiger did not attack the goat because it was well-fed. Timur did not sense danger, and therefore, did not behave like a victim; it was also suggested that he displayed dominant traits in that episode.

"Why is this happening? In our opinion, society is morally and psychologically tired of endless conflicts, militarization trends, sanctions, and counter-sanctions. People want, as banal as it sounds, to diversify their lives with kindness, to weave a couple of cats into its fabric. There is a growing general tension in the world, a striving for death, aggression, and destruction. At some point, the powerful destructive wave became so huge that people unconsciously began to look for stories about love, kindness, and the instinct of self-preservation. If it weren't for the tiger and the goat, people would have switched to something else".

On June 24, 2016, a statement from Evgenia Patanovskaya, a former press secretary of the Primorsky Safari Park, was published in the press. She claimed that there were no friendly relations between the tiger and the goat: the goat was mistakenly brought to a well-fed tiger, which is why it wasn't eaten, and the park's PR department decided to develop a story out of it. The predator was fed every time it was near the goat. However, the park's director, Dmitry Mezentsev, refuted this information, starting by saying that Evgenia Patanovskaya was not a press secretary but worked in the park's zoo and veterinary department for only 7 days in mid-December.

In April 2017, the same park decided to repeat the experiment with a goat and a tiger. A six-month-old tiger cub named Sherkhan and a young goat named Timurid were placed in the same enclosure. However, they did not become friends, and the animals were separated.

== Criticism ==
Despite the popularity of the animals, their friendship was not universally viewed positively.

"This situation is a disgrace to the entire tiger species. It so happened that Amur's mother did not teach him how to get his own food: she did not teach him how to kill. And a tiger must do this, otherwise it will die. This is distorted behavior that is recorded in zoos all the time: a lion and a dog, a cat with a monkey, a tiger with a goat. The trouble is that people might think that you can be friends with a tiger, that it can love. This is not far from tragedy … We do not let strangers near the animals because it is very dangerous here. You should never treat predators as friends."
—Viktor Yudin, Ph.D. in Biology, senior researcher at the Institute of Biology and Soil Science, Far Eastern Branch of the Russian Academy of Sciences

"There is a certain risk for the goat. What if the tiger gets hungry, the zookeepers are an hour late, he will break its spine with one blow … The goat, left alone, did not drink or eat out of sorrow—that's our imagination."
—Nikolay Drozdov

"It's better to take the goat away, just so as not to upset the public, because this goat is already a star, and a world-class star at that. And it would probably be right not to risk him anymore."
—Edgard Zapashny
