= Karagay, Kuyurgazinsky District, Republic of Bashkortostan =

Karagay Карагай
- Village
- Location within Bashkortostan Location within Russia
- Coordinates: 52°50′N 55°45′E
- Country: Russia
- Region: Bashkortostan
- District: Kuyurgazinsky District
- Time zone: UTC+5:00

Karagay (Russian: Карагай; Bashkir: Ҡарағай, Qarağay) is a rural locality (a village) in Ilkineyevsky Selsoviet, Kuyurgazinsky District, Bashkortostan, Russia. The population was 46 as of 2010. There are 2 streets.

== Geography ==
Karagay is located 20 km north of Yermolayevo (the district's administrative centre) by road. Karagayka is the nearest rural locality.
