= Amursky, Altai Krai =

Amursky Амурский
- Settlement
- Location within Altai Krai Location within Russia
- Coordinates: 52°28′N 85°18′E
- Country: Russia
- Region: Altai Krai
- District: Biysky District
- Time zone: UTC+7:00

Amursky (Russian: Амурский) is a rural locality (a settlement) in Lesnoy Selsoviet, Biysky District, Altai Krai, Russia. The population was 306 as of 2013. There are 11 streets.

== Geography ==
Amursky is located 12 km southeast of Biysk (the district's administrative centre) by road. Lesnoye is the nearest rural locality.
