= Gachilbong (Inje County and Yanggu County) =

Mountain in South Korea

Highest point
- Elevation: 1,242 m (4,075 ft)

Geography
- Location: South Korea

Korean name
- Hangul: 가칠봉
- Hanja: 加七峰
- RR: Gachilbong
- MR: Kach'ilbong

Gachilbong (Korean: 가칠봉) is a mountain that sits on the boundary between the counties of Yanggu and Inje, in Gangwon Province, South Korea. It has an elevation of 1,242 m (4,075 ft).

== See also ==
- List of mountains in Korea
