= Thomas Ammer =

German historian (1937–2024)

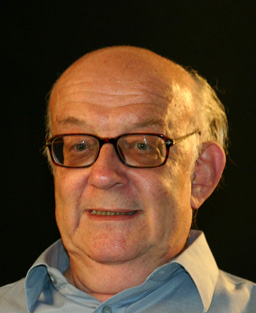
- Ammer in 2006
- Born: 19 July 1937; Eisenberg, Gau Thuringia, Germany
- Died: 11 October 2024 (aged 87); Euskirchen, North Rhine-Westphalia, Germany
- Occupation: Historian
- Political party: SPD (after 1964)

Thomas Ammer (19 July 1937 – 11 October 2024) was a German historian who as a young man studied to become a physician. He was arrested and imprisoned in 1958 for anti-government political activism in East Germany and he never qualified as a medical doctor. His 15-year prison sentence was cut short in August 1964 when his release was purchased by the West German government, and at the age of 27 he relocated to the German Federal Republic.

== Life ==
=== Early years ===
Thomas Ammer was born in a small town in Thuringia in what was then central southern Germany. His parents owned a craft-based business devoted to the production of historical key-board instruments. Ammer's father became associated with Communist opposition groups in 1943, and after 1945 when the ban on it was lifted, joined the German Communist Party; but he died in January 1946 when Thomas was not yet nine years old.

=== Eisenberger Circle ===
Germans!

What has Bolshevik rule given you up till now?

Deprivation of free expression, of the right to assemble, of a free press, of the right to strike.
Perpetuation of the war-time identity card system, ruthless profiteering and price increases from producers.

Do you want to see all this continuing? [If you don't, you should] vote with your fellow workers and against the so-called "National Front [league of quasi-political parties controlled by the ruling SED (party)].".

Deutscher!
Was hat dir die bisherige bolschewistische Herrschaft gebracht?

Entziehung der freien Meinungsäußerung, der Versammlungs− und Pressefreiheit, des Streikrechts.
Immer noch kriegsmäßiges Kartensystem, HO-Wucherpreise und rücksichtslose Ausbeutung.

Willst du das alles noch länger mitansehen? Deshalb stimme mit deinen verläßlichen Arbeitskameraden gegen die sogenannte Nationale Front!

Notice pasted to a wall by representatives of the Eisenberger Group

In 1953, Thomas Ammer and his school fellows including Reinhard Spalke, Günter Schwarz, Ludwig and Wilhelm Ziehr along with Johann Frömel formed a political group which later came to be known in the western media as the Eisenberger Group. The background was the violent military suppression in June 1953 of the strikes and street protests convulsing the German Democratic Republic. The group made it their business to highlight examples of politically arbitrary or despotic actions by the authorities. They prepared leaflets and decorated walls and trucks with slogans, anti-government messages and "modified" versions of the logo used by the country's ruling SED (party). Ammer was part of the leadership of the group.

In 1955 Ammer passed the exams that marked the end of his schooling and went on to study Medicine at the Friedrich Schiller University (FSU) in Jena. This greatly extended his network of contacts and the so-called (in retrospect) Eisenberger Circle expanded beyond its base of Eisenberg school students to become a significant opposition movement, albeit not one that ever boasted any sort of structured national organisation.

After 1945 the German Democratic Republic hosted several hundred thousand Soviet troops, but the country made do without any army of its own until the formal establishment, in March 1956, of the National People's Army (four months after the establishment of the Bundeswehr in West Germany). This prompted Ammer and other members of the Eisenberger group, on 26 January 1956, to signal opposition to German rearmament by setting fire to a shooting stand belonging to the Party Battle group's "Sports and Technology Association". Ammer was the man who got hold of the kindling wood and petrol/gasoline needed for the exploit. For 1957 the Eisenberger Circle planned an appeal to academics to resist the growing centralisation of control over the universities. To outsiders, group members kept their heads down and conformed, Jammer himself serving as FDJ secretary for his student year group. They had nevertheless been noticed by the Ministry for State Security (MfS / Stasi) who during 1957 succeeded in infiltrating their own spy, a Theology student called Juergen Keller, into the group.

=== Political detention ===
"We did not want to have to face the question that our parents faced from us regarding the Nazi regime: Why did you do nothing?"

„Wir wollten uns nicht die Frage stellen müssen, die wir unseren Eltern mit Blick auf das Nazi-Regime stellten: Warum habt ihr nichts getan?“

Thomas Ammer quoted in the Tag des Herrn

Starting with information obtained from the theology student, the Stasi launched a lengthy investigation process, apparently in May 1957. On 13 February 1958 they arrested Thomas Ammer and placed him inside the "MfS Investigation Prison" in Gera. By April 1958 almost 40 from the group had been taken into custody and another five, anticipating arrest, had fled to the safety of West Berlin. The Gera district court then handed out prison sentences totaling 116 years to the detainees. Thomas Ammer himself, seen as the "head" of the group, was sentenced on 27 September 1958, receiving the longest individual sentence, at 15 years, for "Treason against the state" ("Staatsverrat"). He was taken to the Super prison at Waldheim, later being transferred to the Brandenburg-Görden Prison. His final few weeks in detention would be spent inside the Stasi investigation prison at Berlin-Lichtenberg.

=== Life in West Germany ===
On 14 August 1964, after six years in prison, Ammer was among the first of the 33,755 political prisoners to have their freedom purchased under the terms of a (not uncontroversial) agreement concluded between East and West Germany in 1962. He was summarily delivered to the German Federal Republic where he was now able to embark on a period of study that covered Political sciences, Law and History, which took him to the universities of Tübingen, Bonn and Erlangen (by Nuremberg). He then took a job editing a magazine based in Switzerland, at the same time becoming an historian at the Social Sciences Academy in Erlangen. His work included publishing papers and articles that dealt with the German Democratic Republic and he was therefore still subject to surveillance from the East German State Security Ministry despite now living and working in West Germany. In 1968 he became a member of the West German Social Democratic Party (SPD), retaining his membership till 1982. In 1975 he obtained a research post at the Complete Germany Institute in Bonn. He stayed with The Institute till its mandate was overtaken by the march of history and it was dissolved in 1991: he continued to live in nearby Euskirchen, in a small house filled with his books. In 1992 he became an "expert member" on the Secretariat of the Commission set up by the German Bundestag to try and resolve some of the issues left over from the single-party dictatorship that had, until 1990, been the German Democratic Republic.

=== Death ===
Ammer died in Euskirchen, North Rhine-Westphalia on 11 October 2024, at the age of 87.

== Awards and honours ==
- Order of Merit of the Federal Republic of Germany (1998)

== Selected publications ==
- Universität zwischen Demokratie und Diktatur: Ein Beitrag zur Nachkriegsgeschichte der Universität Rostock, Cologne 1969.
- with Gunter Holzweissig: Die DDR, Bundesministerium der Verteidigung, Bonn 1979.
- Die Kritik an der DDR− und Deutschlandforschung der Bundesrepublik Deutschland in den wissenschaftlichen Zeitschriften und Medien der DDR 1962–1983 (Selected documents), Gesamtdeutsches Institut, Bonn 1983.
- Von der SED zur PDS, Gesamtdeutsches Institut, Bonn 1991.
- with Hans-Joachim Memmler (Ed.): Staatssicherheit in Rostock: Zielgruppen, Methoden, Auflösung, Köln 1991, ISBN 3-8046-0337-8.
- with Jürgen Weber (Ed.): Der SED-Staat: Neues über eine vergangene Diktatur, München 1994, ISBN 3-7892-8340-1.
- Widerstand und Opposition in Jena. In: Deutscher Bundestag (Hg.): Materialien der Enquete-Kommission „Aufarbeitung von Geschichte und Folgen der SED-Diktatur in Deutschland“, Vol. VII/1, Baden-Baden 1995, P. 128–139
- Die Gedanken sind frei. Widerstand an den Universitäten 1945 bis 1961. In Ulrike Poppe/Rainer Eckert/Ilko-Sascha Kowalczuk (Ed.): Zwischen Selbstbehauptung und Anpassung. Formen des Widerstands und der Opposition in der DDR, Berlin 1995, P. 142–161
- Deutschlandpolitische Konzeptionen der Opposition in der DDR 1949–1961. In: Deutscher Bundestag (Hrsg.): Materialien der Enquete-Kommission "Überwindung der Folgen der SED-Diktatur im Prozeß der Deutschen Einheit", Bd. VIII/1, Baden-Baden 1999, P. 491–510
- Widerstand an DDR-Oberschulen 1945–1968. In: Klaus-Dieter Henke/Peter Steinbach/Johannes Tuchel (Ed.): Opposition und Widerstand in der DDR, Köln 1999, P. 125–136
- with Otto Schmuck and Olaf Hillenbrand (Ed.): Die Zukunft der Europäischen Union: Osterweiterung und Fortsetzung des Einigungsweges als doppelte Herausforderung, Bundeszentrale für politische Bildung, Bonn 2000, ISBN 3-89331-373-7.
