= Karagay, Arkhangelsky District, Republic of Bashkortostan =

Karagay Карагай
- Village
- Location within Bashkortostan Location within Russia
- Coordinates: 54°27′N 57°09′E
- Country: Russia
- Region: Bashkortostan
- District: Arkhangelsky District
- Time zone: UTC+5:00

Karagay (Russian: Карагай; Bashkir: Ҡарағай, Qarağay) is a rural locality (a village) in Uzunlarovsky Selsoviet, Arkhangelsky District, Bashkortostan, Russia. The population was 18 as of 2010. There are two streets.

== Geography ==
Karagay is located 39 km east of Arkhangelskoye (the district's administrative centre) by road. Azovo is the nearest rural locality.
