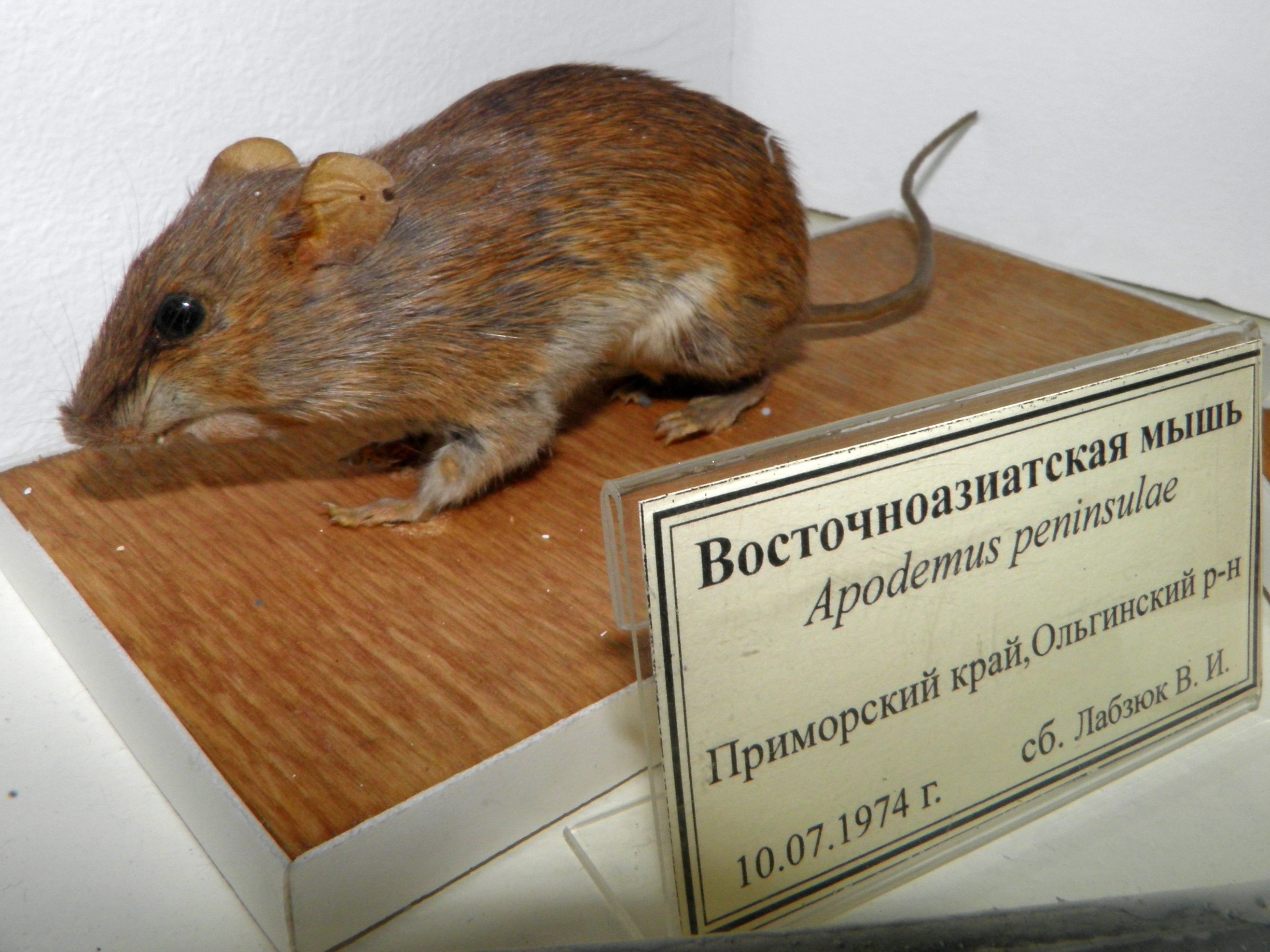

Conservation status
- Least Concern (IUCN 3.1)

Scientific classification
- Kingdom: Animalia
- Phylum: Chordata
- Class: Mammalia
- Order: Rodentia
- Family: Muridae
- Genus: Apodemus
- Species: A. peninsulae

Binomial name
- Apodemus peninsulae (Thomas, 1907)

= Korean field mouse =

Species of rodent

The Korean field mouse (Apodemus peninsulae), also known as the Korean wood mouse, is a species of mouse. It is distributed across Northeastern Asia, including the Russian Far East, northern China, the Korean Peninsula, Sakhalin, and Hokkaidō. It is not found on the Korean island of Jeju. The adult has a body length of 76–125 mm, with a tail of nearly equal length (75–112 mm).

== See also ==
- Soochong virus
