= Amurskoye =

Amurskoye Амурское
- Selo
- Location within Amur Oblast Location within Russia
- Coordinates: 50°44′N 128°44′E
- Country: Russia
- Region: Amur Oblast
- District: Belogorsky District
- Time zone: UTC+9:00

Amurskoye (Russian: Амурское) is a rural locality (a selo) and the administrative center of Amursky Selsoviet of Belogorsky District, Amur Oblast, Russia. The population was 946 as of 2018. There are 14 streets.

== Geography ==
Amurskoye is located 32 km southeast of Belogorsk (the district's administrative centre) by road. Vozzhayevka is the nearest rural locality.
