= Adolf Weil (physician) =

German pathologist and internist (1848–1916)

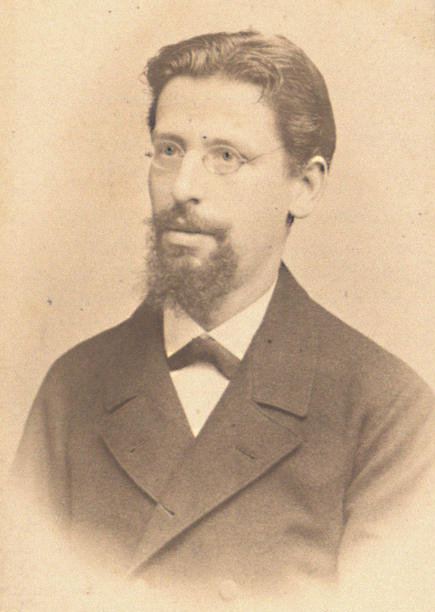
- Adolf Weil in 1886
- Born: 7 February 1848
- Died: 23 July 1916 (aged 68)

Adolf Weil (7 February 1848, Heidelberg – 23 July 1916, Wiesbaden) was a German physician after whom Weil's disease is named.

Weil studied medicine at the University of Heidelberg, and afterwards furthered his education in Berlin and Vienna. From 1872 to 1876 he was an assistant to Friedrich Theodor von Frerichs (1819–1885) in Berlin. In 1886, he was appointed professor of special pathology and therapy at the Imperial University of Dorpat, but resigned shortly afterwards, after contracting tuberculosis of the larynx and permanently losing his voice. Later he lived and worked in Ospitaletto, San Remo and Badenweiler, relocating to Wiesbaden in 1893, where he died in 1916.

In 1913, in collaboration with Emil Abderhalden (1877–1950) he isolated an alpha-amino acid known as norleucine. Among his written works was a treatise on the auscultation of arteries and veins, Die Auscultation der Arterien und Venen (1875), and a monograph titled Handbuch und Atlas der topographischen Percussion (Handbook and atlas of topographical percussion) (1877).

Shortly after receiving news that Weil's disease was caused by a spirochete, he died of acute hemoptysis.
