= Conjunctival suffusion =

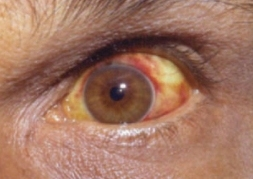
- Conjunctival suffusion (red conjunctiva) together with jaundice is a specific feature of leptospirosis
- Diagnostic method: Weil's disease, Hantavirus

Conjunctival suffusion is an eye finding occurring early in leptospirosis, which is caused by Leptospira interrogans. Conjunctival suffusion is characterized by redness of the conjunctiva that resembles conjunctivitis, but it does not involve inflammatory exudates. Swelling of the conjunctiva (chemosis) is seen along the corners of the eye (palpebral fissures).

About 30 percent of people with leptospirosis (also known as Weil's disease) develop conjunctival suffusion. When it does occur, it develops towards the end of the early phase of the illness. Even in severe cases, the suffusion occurs in the first phase of the illness.

Conjunctival suffusion may also occur in patients with a Hantavirus infection. In a 1994 study of 17 patients with Hantavirus infections, 3 had conjunctival suffusion.
