= Gachilbong (Inje County) =

Mountain in South Korea

Highest point
- Elevation: 1,164 m (3,819 ft)

Geography
- Location: South Korea

Korean name
- Hangul: 가칠봉
- Hanja: 加漆峰
- RR: Gachilbong
- MR: Kach'ilbong

Gachilbong (Korean: 가칠봉) is a mountain of South Korea. It has an elevation of 1,164 metres.

== See also ==
- List of mountains of Korea
