= Ust-Koksa =

Ust-Koksa Усть-Кокса
- Selo

Other transcription(s)
  - Altai: Кӧк-Суу Оозы
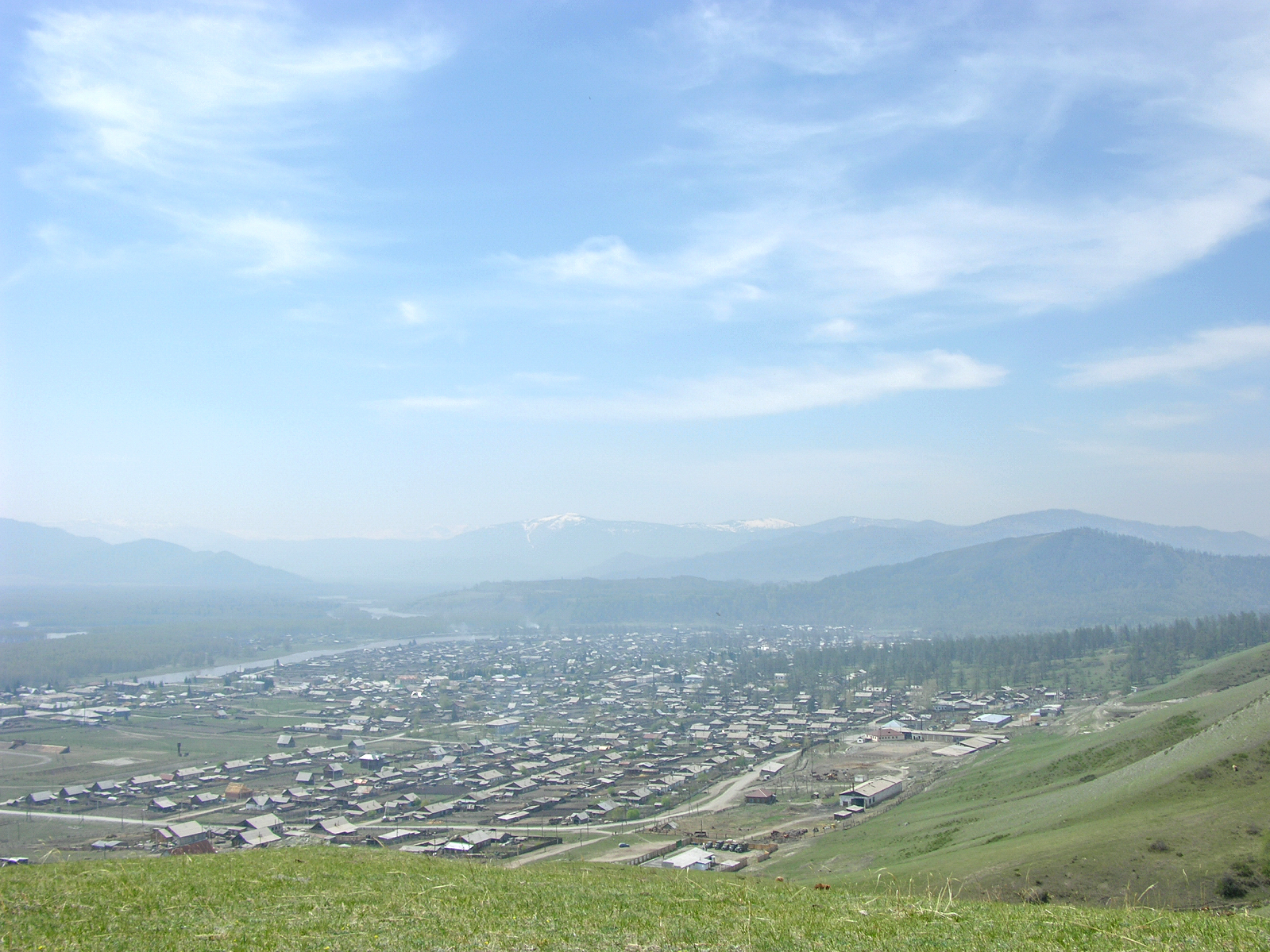

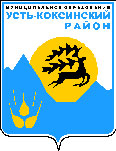
- Coat of arms
- Interactive map of Ust-Koksa
- Location of Ust-Koksa Ust-Koksa (Altai Republic)
- Coordinates: 50°16′12″N 85°36′56″E
- Country: Russia
- Federal subject: Altai Republic
- Administrative district: Ust-Koksinsky District
- SelsovietSelsoviet: Ust-Koksinsky
- Founded: 1807
- Elevation: 979 m (3,212 ft)

Population (2010 Census)
  - Total: 4,373
  - Estimate (2016): 4,437 (+1.5%)

Administrative status
  - Capital of: Ust-Koksinsky District, Ust-Koksinsky Selsoviet

Municipal status
  - Municipal district: Ust-Koksinsky Municipal District
  - Rural settlement: Ust-Koksinskoye Rural Settlement
  - Capital of: Ust-Koksinsky Municipal District, Ust-Koksinskoye Rural Settlement
- Time zone: UTC+6 (MSK+3)
- Postal code: 649490
- OKTMO ID: 84640475101

Ust-Koksa (Russian: Усть-Ко́кса, Altay: Кӧк-Суу Оозы, romanized: Kök-Sû Ôzı) is a rural locality (a selo) and the administrative center of Ust-Koksinsky District of the Altai Republic, Russia. Population: 4,373 (2010 census); 3,986 (2002 census); 3,526 (1989 Soviet census).

== Climate ==
Climate data for Ust-Koksa (extremes 1936-present)
Month	Jan	Feb	Mar	Apr	May	Jun	Jul	Aug	Sep	Oct	Nov	Dec	Year
Record high °C (°F)	5.7 (42.3)	8.4 (47.1)	17.2 (63.0)	27.3 (81.1)	33.2 (91.8)	33.4 (92.1)	36.5 (97.7)	36.4 (97.5)	31.2 (88.2)	23.7 (74.7)	12.6 (54.7)	8.2 (46.8)	36.5 (97.7)
Mean daily maximum °C (°F)	−14.4 (6.1)	−9.3 (15.3)	0.2 (32.4)	12.0 (53.6)	18.3 (64.9)	23.3 (73.9)	24.7 (76.5)	23.3 (73.9)	17.1 (62.8)	8.4 (47.1)	−3.5 (25.7)	−12.0 (10.4)	7.3 (45.2)
Daily mean °C (°F)	−20.0 (−4.0)	−15.8 (3.6)	−6.0 (21.2)	4.4 (39.9)	10.2 (50.4)	15.1 (59.2)	16.8 (62.2)	14.7 (58.5)	8.6 (47.5)	1.5 (34.7)	−8.5 (16.7)	−16.9 (1.6)	0.3 (32.6)
Mean daily minimum °C (°F)	−24.5 (−12.1)	−21.5 (−6.7)	−12.2 (10.0)	−2.1 (28.2)	3.0 (37.4)	8.1 (46.6)	10.2 (50.4)	7.9 (46.2)	2.0 (35.6)	−3.6 (25.5)	−12.5 (9.5)	−21.0 (−5.8)	−5.5 (22.1)
Record low °C (°F)	−48.5 (−55.3)	−43.9 (−47.0)	−37.8 (−36.0)	−25.0 (−13.0)	−10.7 (12.7)	−3.0 (26.6)	−1.2 (29.8)	−4.5 (23.9)	−9.8 (14.4)	−22.6 (−8.7)	−42.0 (−43.6)	−46.4 (−51.5)	−48.5 (−55.3)
Average precipitation mm (inches)	12.7 (0.50)	11.9 (0.47)	13.4 (0.53)	31.9 (1.26)	55.0 (2.17)	76.0 (2.99)	76.8 (3.02)	68.7 (2.70)	48.2 (1.90)	35.0 (1.38)	25.9 (1.02)	19.3 (0.76)	474.8 (18.7)
Source: pogoda.ru.net
