= Ust-Koksinsky District =

Ust-Koksinsky District Усть-Коксинский район (Russian)
- District

Other transcription(s)
  - Altai: Кӧк-Суу Оозы аймак
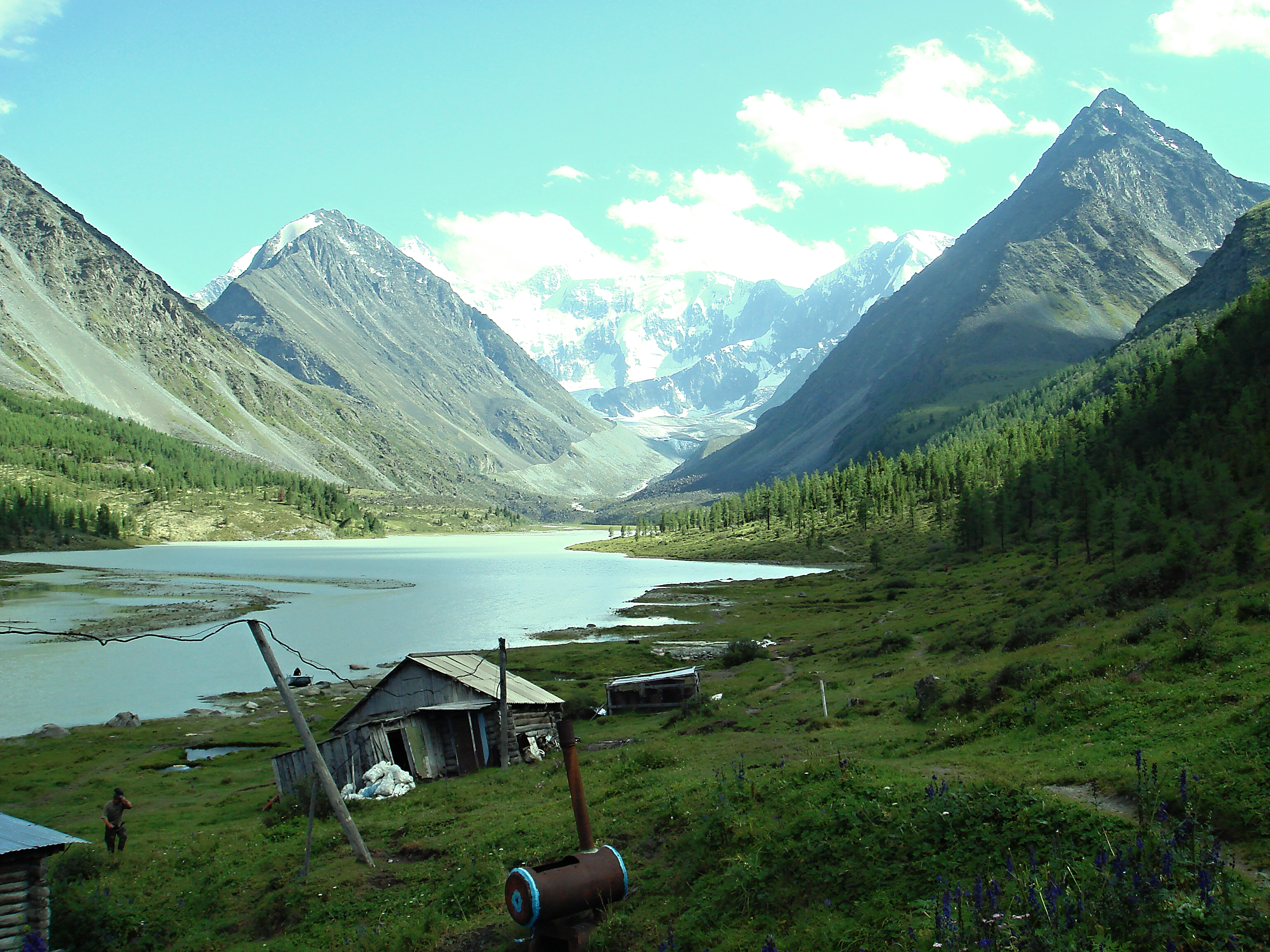
- Lake Akkemskoye, a protected area of Russia in Ust-Koksinsky District

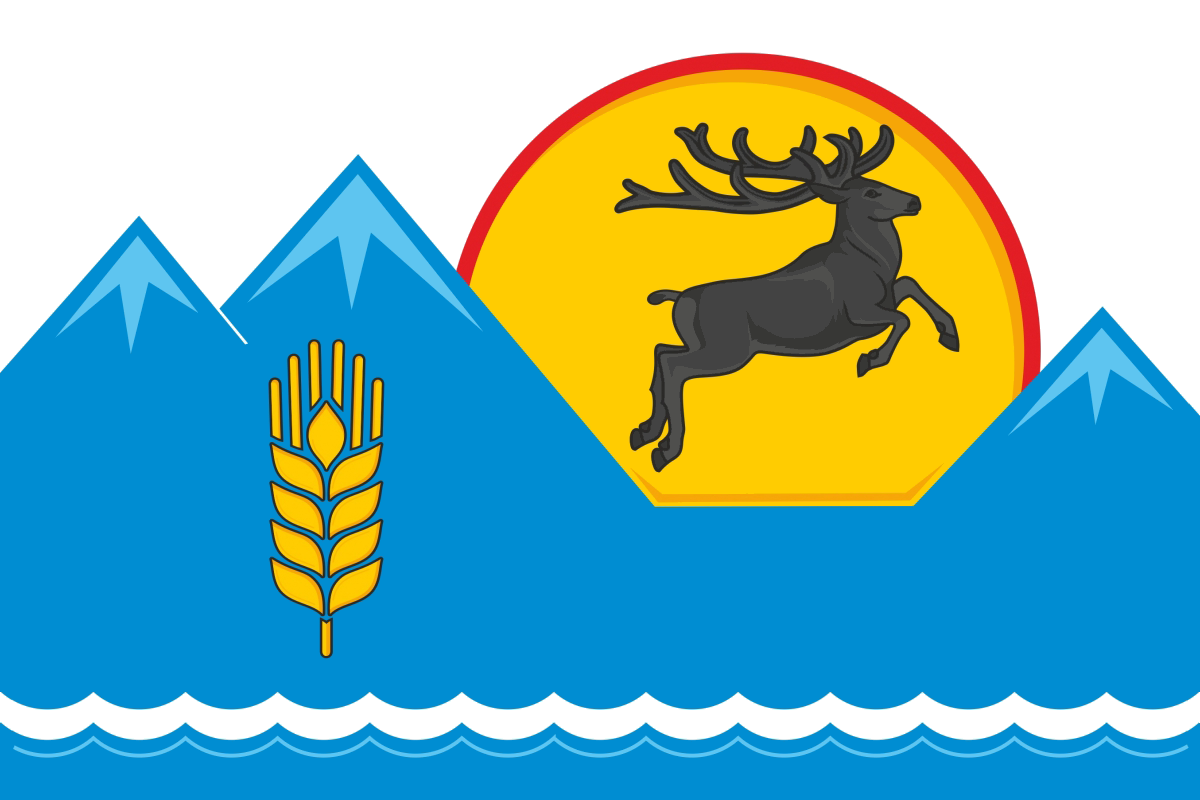
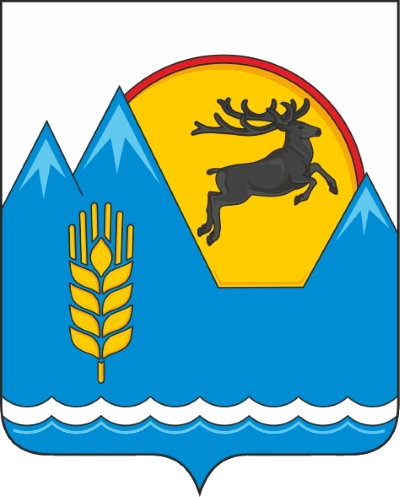
- Flag Coat of arms
- Location of Ust-Koksinsky District in the Altai Republic
- Coordinates: 51°57′N 85°57′E
- Country: Russia
- Federal subject: Altai Republic
- Established: October 19, 1923
- Administrative center: Ust-Koksa

Area
  - Total: 12,960 km^{2} (5,000 sq mi)

Population (2010 Census)
  - Total: 17,020
  - Density: 1.313/km^{2} (3.401/sq mi)
  - Urban: 0%
  - Rural: 100%

Administrative structure
  - Administrative divisions: 9 Rural settlements
  - Inhabited localities: 42 rural localities

Municipal structure
  - Municipally incorporated as: Ust-Koksinsky Municipal District
  - Municipal divisions: 0 urban settlements, 9 rural settlements
- Time zone: UTC+6 (MSK+3)
- OKTMO ID: 84640000
- Website: http://www.altay-ust-koksa.ru

Population of Ust-Koksinsky District
- 2010 Census: 17,020
- 2002 Census: 17,481
- 1989 Census: 16,734
- 1979 Census: 16,367

Ust-Koksinsky District (Russian: Усть-Ко́ксинский райо́н; Altay: Кӧк-Суу Оозы аймак, Kök-Suu Oozı aymak) is an administrative and municipal district (raion), one of the ten in the Altai Republic, Russia. It is located in the west and southwest of the republic. The area of the district is 12,960 square kilometers (5,000 sq mi). Its administrative center is the rural locality (a selo) of Ust-Koksa. As of the 2010 Census, the total population of the district was 17,020, with the population of Ust-Koksa accounting for 25.7% of that number.

== History ==
The district was established on October 19, 1923 as Uymonsky District (Уймонский район) within Oirot Autonomous Oblast. It was given its present name on April 10, 1933.

== Administrative and municipal status ==
Within the framework of administrative divisions, Ust-Koksinsky District is one of the ten in the Altai Republic. As a municipal division, the district is incorporated as Ust-Koksinsky Municipal District. Both administrative and municipal districts are divided into the same nine rural settlements, comprising forty-two rural localities. The selo of Ust-Koksa serves as the administrative center of both the administrative and municipal districts.

== Nature reserves ==
The district is home to two nature reserves: Katunsky State Natural Biosphere Reserve and Belukha Nature Park.
