= Pathogenic bacteria =

Disease-causing bacteria

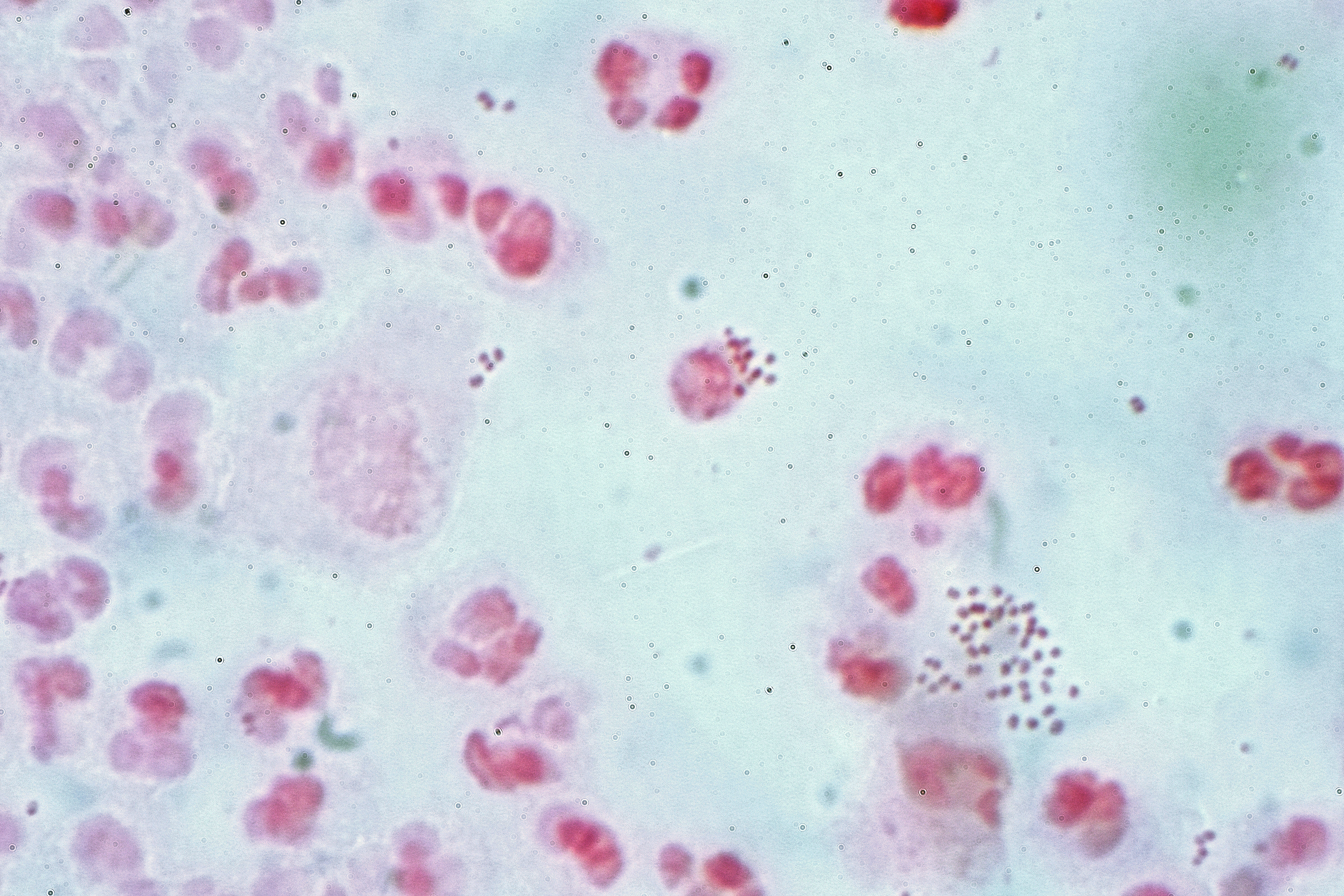
- Neisseria gonorrhoeae (small red dots) in pus from a man with a urethral discharge (Gram stain)

Pathogenic bacteria are bacteria that can cause disease. This article focuses on the bacteria that are pathogenic to humans. Most species of bacteria are harmless and many are beneficial but others can cause infectious diseases. The number of these pathogenic species in humans is estimated to be fewer than a hundred. By contrast, several thousand species are considered part of the gut flora, with a few hundred species present in each individual human's digestive tract.

The body is continually exposed to many species of bacteria, including beneficial commensals, which grow on the skin and mucous membranes, and saprophytes, which grow mainly in the soil and in decaying matter. The blood and tissue fluids contain nutrients sufficient to sustain the growth of many bacteria. The body has defence mechanisms that enable it to resist microbial invasion of its tissues and give it a natural immunity or innate resistance against many microorganisms.

Pathogenic bacteria are specially adapted and endowed with mechanisms for overcoming the normal body defences, and can invade parts of the body, such as the blood, where bacteria are not normally found. Some pathogens invade only the surface epithelium, skin or mucous membrane, but many travel more deeply, spreading through the tissues and disseminating by the lymphatic and blood streams. In some rare cases a pathogenic microbe can infect an entirely healthy person, but infection usually occurs only if the body's defence mechanisms are damaged by some local trauma or an underlying debilitating disease, such as wounding, intoxication, chilling, fatigue, and malnutrition. In many cases, it is important to differentiate infection and colonization, which is when the bacteria are causing little or no harm.

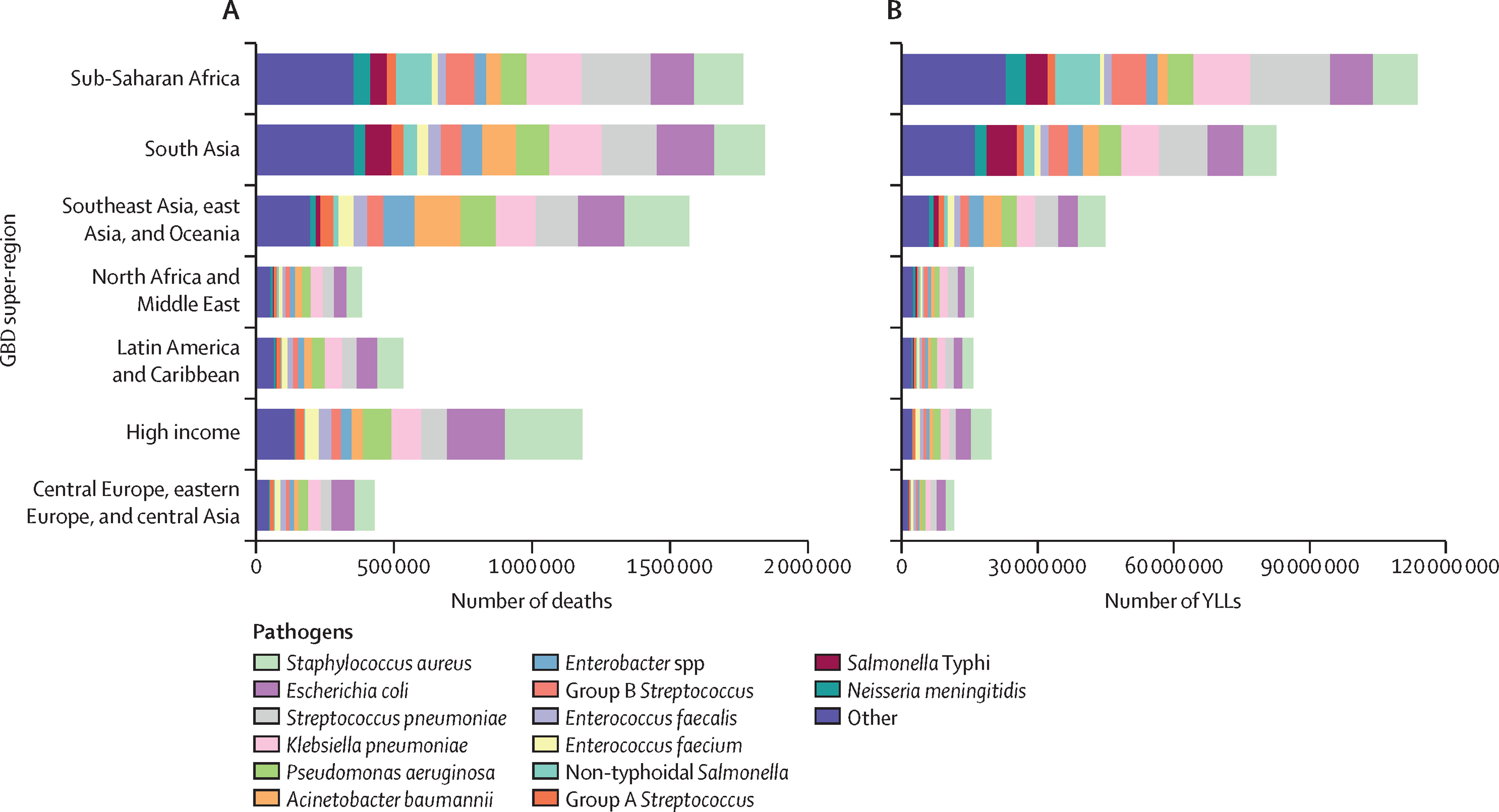
Global number of deaths (A) and YLLs (B), by pathogen and GBD super-region, 2019

Caused by Mycobacterium tuberculosis bacteria, one of the diseases with the highest disease burden is tuberculosis, which killed 1.4 million people in 2019, mostly in sub-Saharan Africa. Pathogenic bacteria contribute to other globally important diseases, such as pneumonia, which can be caused by bacteria such as Staphylococcus, Streptococcus and Pseudomonas, and foodborne illnesses, which can be caused by bacteria such as Shigella, Campylobacter, and Salmonella. Pathogenic bacteria also cause infections such as tetanus, typhoid fever, diphtheria, syphilis, and leprosy.

Pathogenic bacteria are also the cause of high infant mortality rates in developing countries. A GBD study estimated the global death rates from (33) bacterial pathogens, finding such infections contributed to one in 8 deaths (or ~7.7 million deaths), which could make it the second largest cause of death globally in 2019.

Most pathogenic bacteria can be grown in cultures and identified by Gram stain and other methods. Bacteria grown in this way are often tested to find which antibiotics will be an effective treatment for the infection. For hitherto unknown pathogens, Koch's postulates are the standard to establish a causative relationship between a microbe and a disease.

== Diseases ==
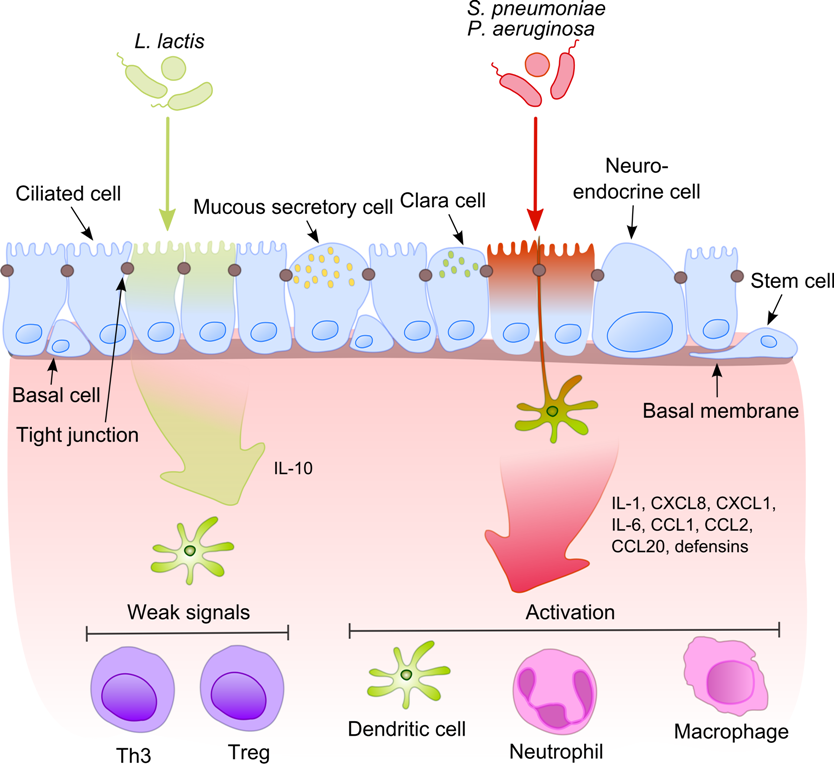
Commensals vs pathogenic bacteria in COPD

Each species has specific effect and causes symptoms in people who are infected. Some people who are infected with a pathogenic bacteria do not have symptoms. Immunocompromised individuals are more susceptible to pathogenic bacteria.

=== Pathogenic susceptibility ===
Some pathogenic bacteria cause disease under certain conditions, such as entry through the skin via a cut, through sexual activity or through compromised immune function.

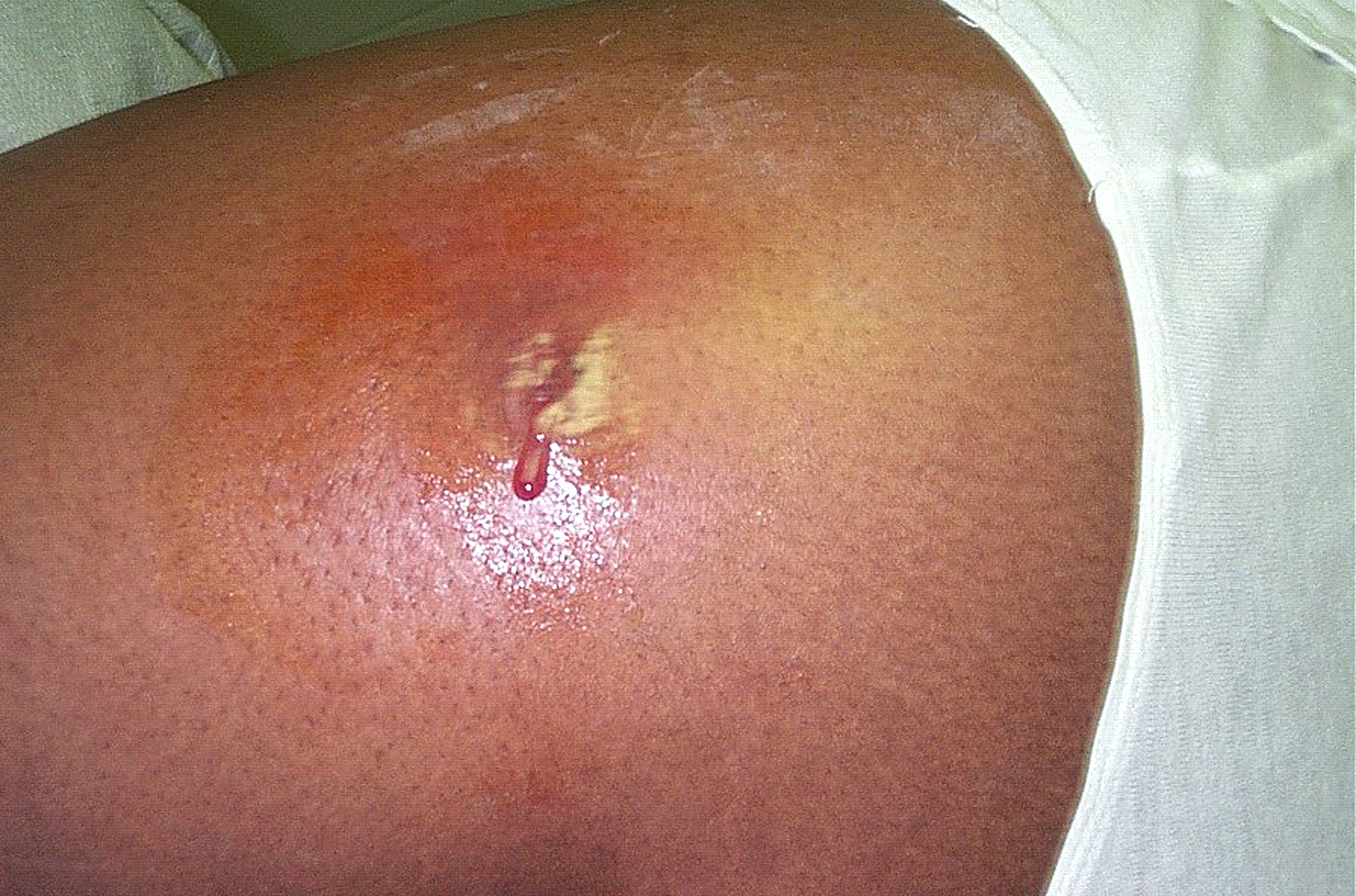
An abscess caused by opportunistic S. aureus bacteria.

Some species of Streptococcus and Staphylococcus are part of the normal skin microbiota and typically reside on healthy skin or in the nasopharyngeal region. Yet these species can potentially initiate skin infections. Streptococcal infections include sepsis, pneumonia, and meningitis. These infections can become serious creating a systemic inflammatory response resulting in massive vasodilation, shock, and death.

Other bacteria are opportunistic pathogens and cause disease mainly in people with immunosuppression or cystic fibrosis. Examples of these opportunistic pathogens include Pseudomonas aeruginosa, Burkholderia cenocepacia, and Mycobacterium avium.

=== Intracellular ===
Obligate intracellular parasites (e.g. Chlamydophila, Ehrlichia, Rickettsia) are only able to grow and replicate inside other cells. Infections due to obligate intracellular bacteria may be asymptomatic, requiring an incubation period. Examples of obligate intracellular bacteria include Rickettsia prowazekii (typhus) and Rickettsia rickettsii, (Rocky Mountain spotted fever).

Chlamydia are intracellular parasites. These pathogens can cause pneumonia or urinary tract infection and may be involved in coronary heart disease.

Other groups of intracellular bacterial pathogens include Salmonella, Neisseria, Brucella, Mycobacterium, Nocardia, Listeria, Francisella, Legionella, and Yersinia pestis. These can exist intracellularly, but can exist outside host cells.

=== Infections in specific tissue ===
Bacterial pathogens often cause infection in specific areas of the body. Others are generalists.

- Bacterial vaginosis is a condition of the vaginal microbiota in which an excessive growth of Gardnerella vaginalis and other mostly anaerobic bacteria displace the beneficial Lactobacilli species that maintain healthy vaginal microbial populations.
- Bacterial meningitis is a bacterial inflammation of the meninges, which are the protective membranes covering the brain and spinal cord.
- Bacterial pneumonia is a bacterial infection of the lungs.
- Urinary tract infection is predominantly caused by bacteria. Symptoms include the strong and frequent sensation or urge to urinate, pain during urination, and urine that is cloudy. The most frequent cause is Escherichia coli. Urine is typically sterile but contains a variety of salts and waste products. Bacteria can ascend into the bladder or kidney and causing cystitis and nephritis.
- Bacterial gastroenteritis is caused by enteric, pathogenic bacteria. These pathogenic species are usually distinct from the usually harmless bacteria of the normal gut flora. But a different strain of the same species may be pathogenic. The distinction is sometimes difficult as in the case of Escherichia.
- Bacterial skin infections include:
  - Impetigo is a highly contagious bacterial skin infection commonly seen in children. It is caused by Staphylococcus aureus, and Streptococcus pyogenes.
  - Erysipelas is an acute streptococcus bacterial infection of the deeper skin layers that spreads via with lymphatic system.
  - Cellulitis is a diffuse inflammation of connective tissue with severe inflammation of dermal and subcutaneous layers of the skin. Cellulitis can be caused by normal skin flora or by contagious contact, and usually occurs through open skin, cuts, blisters, cracks in the skin, insect bites, animal bites, burns, surgical wounds, intravenous drug injection, or sites of intravenous catheter insertion. In most cases it is the skin on the face or lower legs that is affected, though cellulitis can occur in other tissues.

== Mechanisms of damage ==
The symptoms of disease appear as pathogenic bacteria damage host tissues or interfere with their function. The bacteria can damage host cells directly or indirectly by provoking an immune response that inadvertently damages host cells, or by releasing toxins.

=== Direct ===
Once pathogens attach to host cells, they can cause direct damage as the pathogens use the host cell for nutrients and produce waste products. For example, Streptococcus mutans, a component of dental plaque, metabolizes dietary sugar and produces acid as a waste product. The acid decalcifies the tooth surface to cause dental caries.

==== Toxin production ====
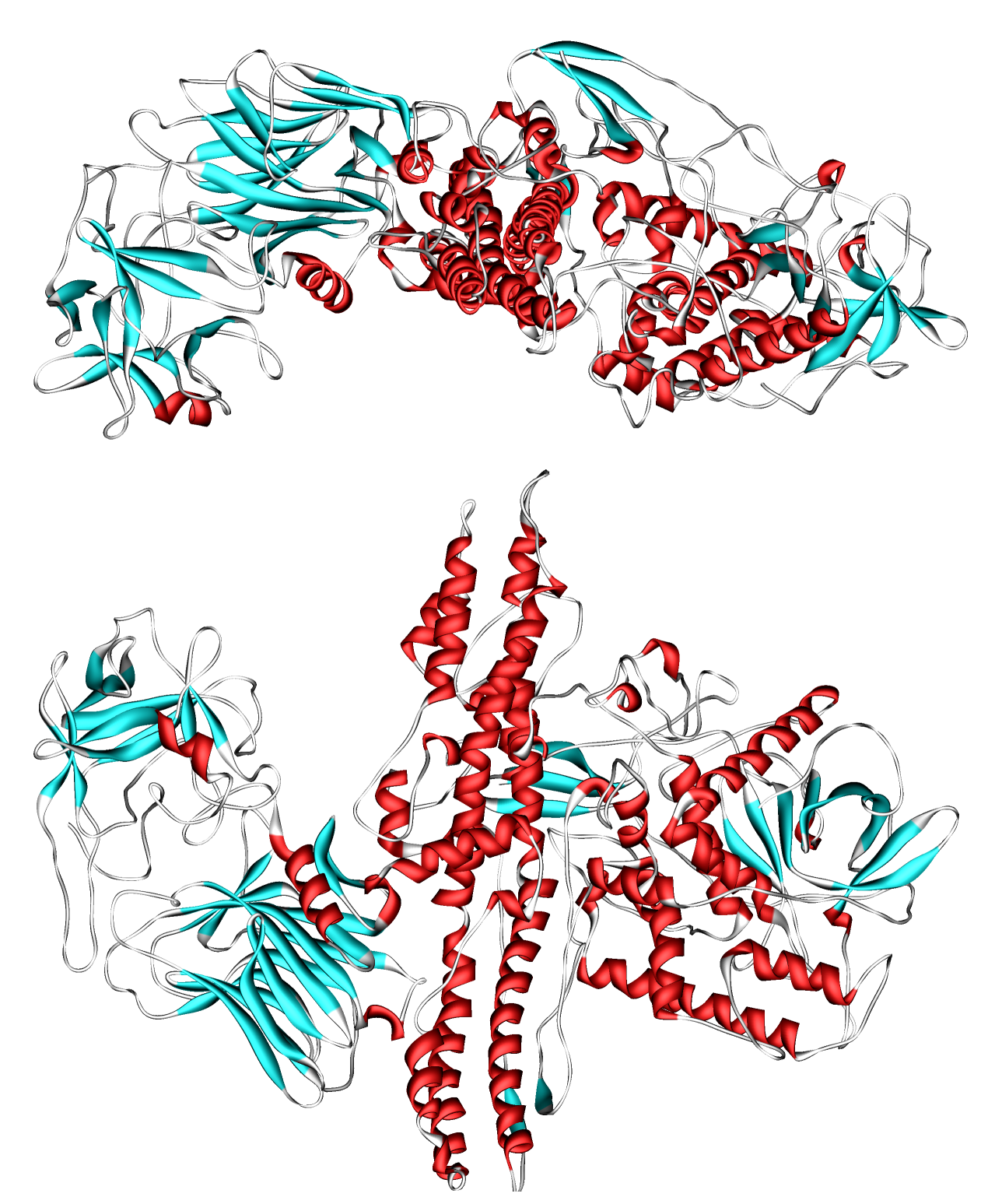
Protein structure of botulinum toxin.

Endotoxins are the lipid portions of lipopolysaccharides that are part of the outer membrane of the cell wall of gram-negative bacteria. Endotoxins are released when the bacteria lyses, which is why after antibiotic treatment, symptoms can worsen at first as the bacteria are killed and they release their endotoxins. Exotoxins are secreted into the surrounding medium or released when the bacteria die and the cell wall breaks apart.

=== Indirect ===
An excessive or inappropriate immune response triggered by an infection may damage host cells.

== Survival in host ==
=== Nutrients ===
Iron is required for humans, as well as the growth of most bacteria. To obtain free iron, some pathogens secrete proteins called siderophores, which take the iron away from iron-transport proteins by binding to the iron even more tightly. Once the iron-siderophore complex is formed, it is taken up by siderophore receptors on the bacterial surface and then that iron is brought into the bacterium.

Bacterial pathogens also require access to carbon and energy sources for growth. To avoid competition with host cells for glucose which is the main energy source used by human cells, many pathogens including the respiratory pathogen Haemophilus influenzae specialise in using other carbon sources such as lactate that are abundant in the human body

== Identification ==
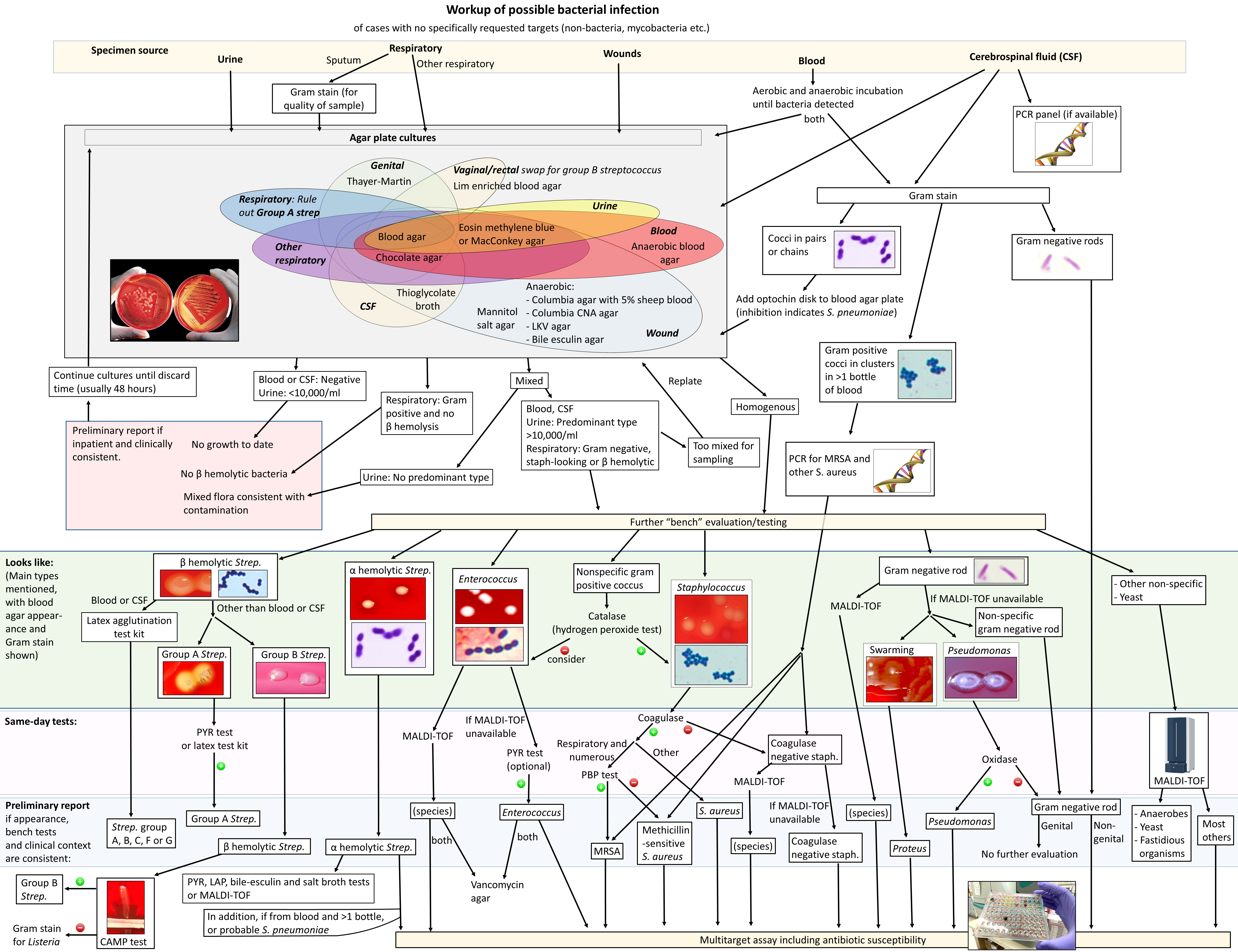
Example of a workup algorithm of possible bacterial infection in cases with no specifically requested targets (non-bacteria, mycobacteria etc.), with most common situations and agents seen in a New England setting.

Typically identification is done by growing the organism in a wide range of cultures which can take up to 48 hours. The growth is then visually or genomically identified. The cultured organism is then subjected to various assays to observe reactions to help further identify species and strain.

== Treatment ==
Bacterial infections may be treated with antibiotics, which are classified as bacteriocidal if they kill bacteria or bacteriostatic if they just prevent bacterial growth. There are many types of antibiotics and each class inhibits a process that is different in the pathogen from that found in the host. For example, the antibiotics chloramphenicol and tetracyclin inhibit the bacterial ribosome but not the structurally different eukaryotic ribosome, so they exhibit selective toxicity. Antibiotics are used both in treating human disease and in intensive farming to promote animal growth. Both uses may be contributing to the rapid development of antibiotic resistance in bacterial populations. Phage therapy, using bacteriophages can also be used to treat certain bacterial infections.

== Prevention ==
Infections can be prevented by antiseptic measures such as sterilizing the skin prior to piercing it with the needle of a syringe and by proper care of indwelling catheters. Surgical and dental instruments are also sterilized to prevent infection by bacteria. Disinfectants such as bleach are used to kill bacteria or other pathogens on surfaces to prevent contamination and further reduce the risk of infection. Bacteria in food are killed by cooking to temperatures above 73 °C (163 °F).

== List of genera and microscopy features ==
Many genera contain pathogenic bacterial species. They often possess characteristics that help to classify and organize them into groups. The following is a partial listing.

Genus	Species	Gram staining	Shape	Oxygen requirement	Intra/Extracellular
Bacillus	Bacillus anthracis; Bacillus cereus	Positive	Rods	Facultative anaerobic	Extracellular
Bartonella	Bartonella henselae; Bartonella quintana	Negative	Rods	Aerobic	Facultative intracellular
Bordetella	Bordetella pertussis	Negative	Small coccobacilli	Aerobic	Extracellular
Borrelia	Borrelia burgdorferi; Borrelia garinii; Borrelia afzelii; Borrelia recurrentis	Negative, stains poorly	Spirochete	Anaerobic	Extracellular
Brucella	Brucella abortus; Brucella canis; Brucella melitensis; Brucella suis	Negative	Coccobacilli	Aerobic	Intracellular
Campylobacter	Campylobacter jejuni	Negative	Spiral rods coccoid in older cultures	Microaerophilic	Extracellular
Chlamydia and Chlamydophila	Chlamydia pneumoniae; Chlamydia trachomatis; Chlamydophila psittaci	(not Gram-stained)	Small, round, ovoid	Facultative or strictly aerobic	Obligate intracellular
Clostridium	Clostridium botulinum; Clostridioides difficile; Clostridium perfringens; Clostridium tetani	Positive	Large, blunt-ended rods	Obligate anaerobic	Extracellular
Corynebacterium	Corynebacterium diphtheriae	Positive (unevenly)	Rods	Mostly facultative anaerobic	Extracellular
Enterococcus	Enterococcus faecalis; Enterococcus faecium	Positive	Cocci	Facultative Anaerobic	Extracellular
Escherichia	Escherichia coli	Negative	Rods	Facultative anaerobic	Extracellular or Intracellular
Francisella	Francisella tularensis	Negative	Coccobacillus	Strictly aerobic	Facultative intracellular
Haemophilus	Haemophilus influenzae	Negative	Coccobacilli to long and slender filaments	Facultative anaerobic 5 – 10% CO2	Extracellular
Helicobacter	Helicobacter pylori	Negative	Spiral rod	Microaerophile	Extracellular
Legionella	Legionella pneumophila	Negative, stains poorly	Cocobacilli	Aerobic	Facultative intracellular
Leptospira	Leptospira interrogans; Leptospira santarosai; Leptospira weilii; Leptospira noguchii	Negative, stains poorly	Spirochete	Strictly aerobic	Extracellular
Listeria	Listeria monocytogenes	Positive, darkly	Slender, short rods	Facultative Anaerobic	Facultative intracellular
Mycobacterium	Mycobacterium leprae; Mycobacterium tuberculosis; Mycobacterium ulcerans	(none)	Long, slender rods	Aerobic	Intracellular
Mycoplasma	Mycoplasma pneumoniae	(none)	Indistinct 'fried egg' appearance, no cell wall	Mostly facultative anaerobic; M. pneumoniae strictly aerobic	Extracellular
Neisseria	Neisseria gonorrhoeae; Neisseria meningitidis	Negative	Kidney bean-shaped	Aerobic	Gonococcus: facultative intracellular N. meningitidis: extracellular
Pseudomonas	Pseudomonas aeruginosa	Negative	Rods	Obligate aerobic	Extracellular
Rickettsia	Rickettsia rickettsii	Negative, stains poorly	Small, rod-like coccobacillary	Aerobic	Obligate intracellular
Salmonella	Salmonella typhi; Salmonella typhimurium	Negative	Rods	Facultative anaerobic	Facultative intracellular
Shigella	Shigella sonnei	Negative	Rods	Facultative anaerobic	Extracellular
Staphylococcus	Staphylococcus aureus; Staphylococcus epidermidis; Staphylococcus saprophyticus	Positive, darkly	Round cocci	Facultative anaerobic	Extracellular, facultative intracellular
Streptococcus	Streptococcus agalactiae; Streptococcus pneumoniae; Streptococcus pyogenes	Positive	Ovoid to spherical	Facultative anaerobic	Extracellular
Treponema	Treponema pallidum	Negative, stains poorly	Spirochete	Aerobic	Extracellular
Ureaplasma	Ureaplasma urealyticum	Stains poorly	Indistinct, 'fried egg' appearance, no cell wall	Anaerobic	Extracellular
Vibrio	Vibrio cholerae; Vibrio vulnificus; Vibrio parahaemolyticus	Negative	Spiral with single polar flagellum	Facultative anaerobic	Extracellular
Yersinia	Yersinia pestis; Yersinia enterocolitica; Yersinia pseudotuberculosis	Negative, bipolarly	Small rods	Facultative anaerobe	Intracellular

== List of species and clinical characteristics ==
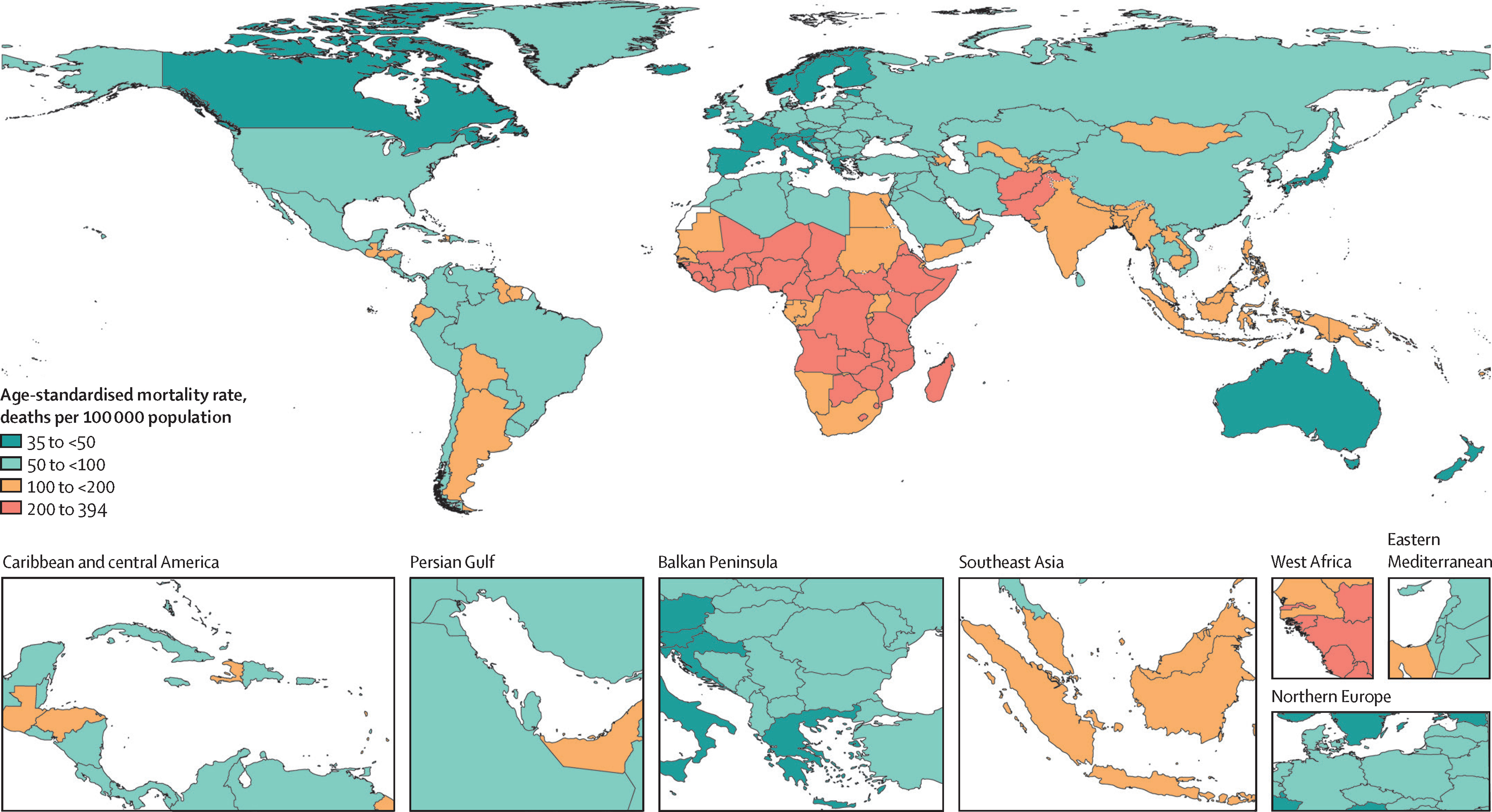
Overall age-standardised mortality rate per 100 000 population for 33 pathogens investigated, 2019

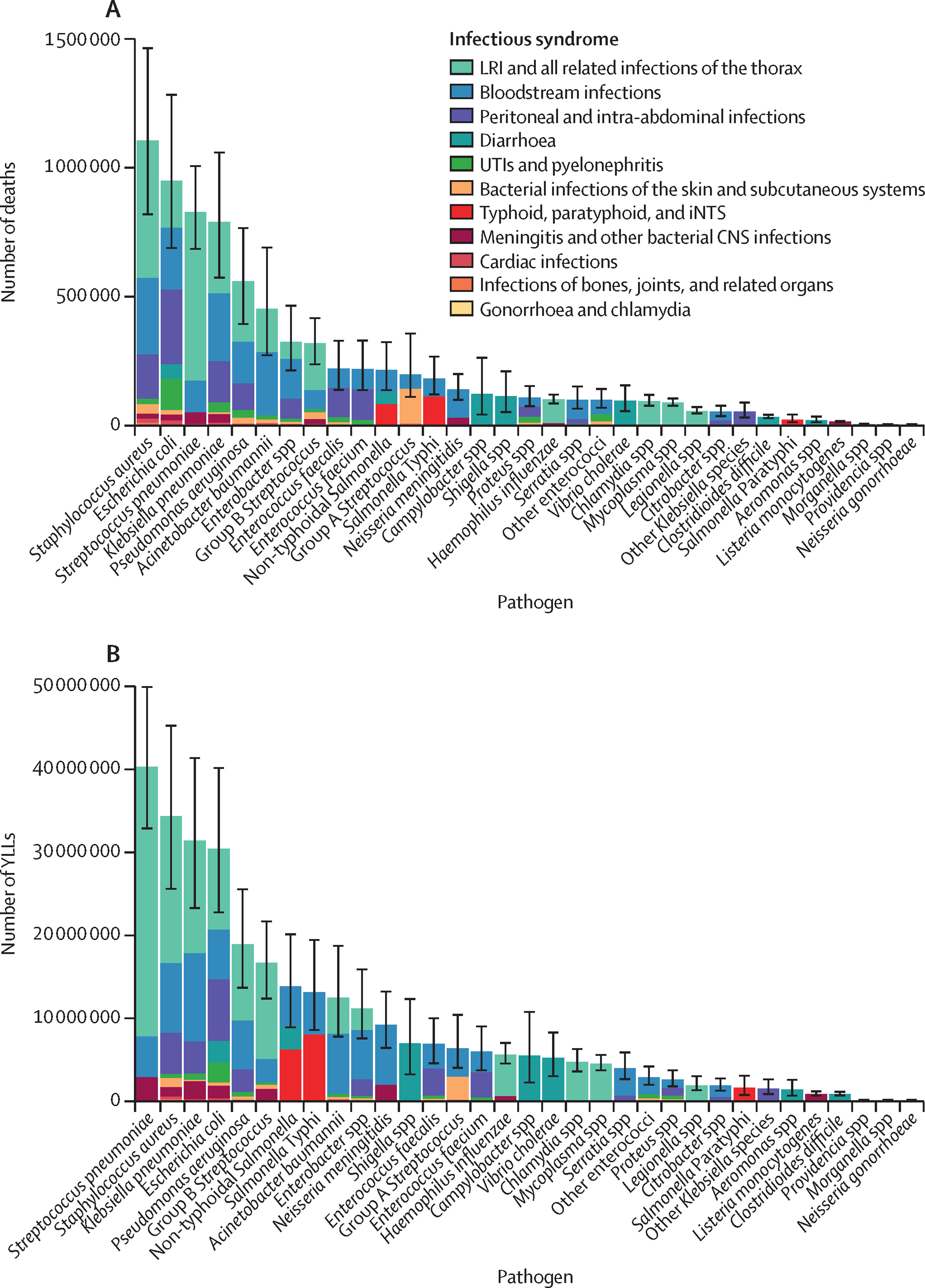
Global number of deaths (A) and YLLs (B), by pathogen and infectious syndrome, 2019

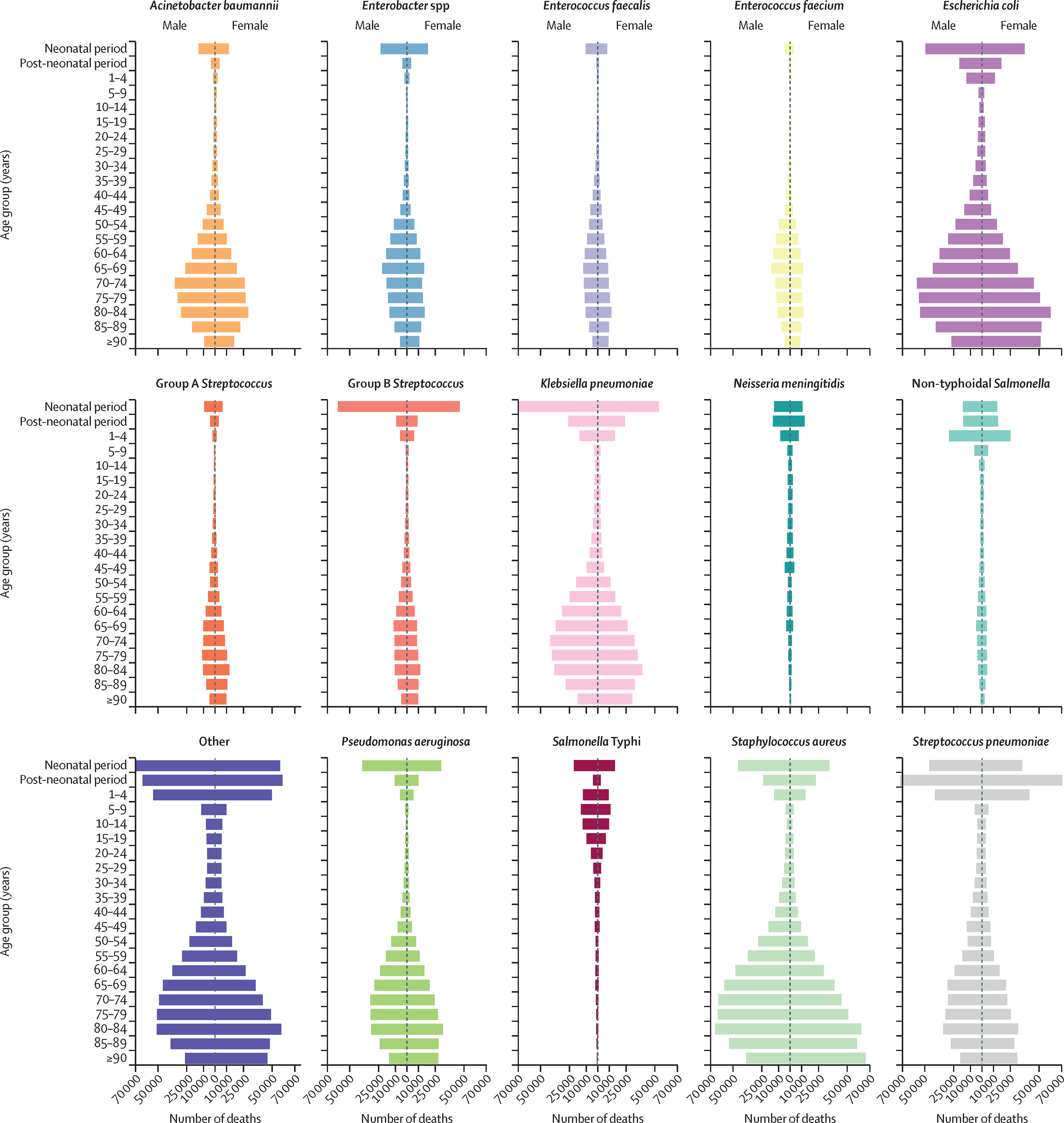
Global number of deaths, by pathogen, age, and sex groups, 2019

This is description of the more common genera and species presented with their clinical characteristics and treatments.

Species of human pathogenic bacteria
Species		Transmission	Diseases	Treatment	Prevention
Actinomyces israelii		Oral flora	Actinomycosis: painful abscesses and cysts MRSA in the mouth, lungs, or gastrointestinal tract.	Prolonged penicillin G and drainage	
Bacillus anthracis		Contact with cattle, sheep, goats and horses Spores enter through inhalation or through abrasions	Anthrax: pulmonary, gastrointestinal and/or cutaneous symptoms.	In early infection: Penicillin; Doxycycline; Ciprofloxacin; Raxibacumab	Anthrax vaccine Autoclaving of equipment
Bacteroides fragilis		Gut flora	Abscesses in gastrointestinal tract, pelvic cavity and lungs	Metronidazole	Wound care Aspiration prevention
Bordetella pertussis		Contact with respiratory droplets expelled by infected human hosts.	Whooping cough Secondary bacterial pneumonia	Macrolides such as erythromycin, before paroxysmal stage	Pertussis vaccine, such as in DPT vaccine
Borrelia	B. burgdorferi B. garinii B. afzelii	Ixodes hard ticks Reservoir in mice, other small mammals, and birds	Lyme disease: Early localized: erythema migrans; Early disseminated: neuroborreliosis, Lyme carditis; Late: Lyme arthritis, Achrodermatitis chronica (B. afzelii only)	Doxycycline for adults, amoxicillin for children, ceftriaxone for neurological involvement	Wearing clothing that limits skin exposure to ticks. Insect repellent. Avoid areas where ticks are found.
Borrelia	B. recurrentis and others (Note: Relapsing fever can also be caused by the following Borrelia species: B. crocidurae, B. duttonii, B. hermsii, B. hispanica, B. miyamotoi, B. persica, B. turicatae and B. venezuelensis.: Barbour, Alan G. (2017). "Relapsing Fever". In Kasper, Dennis L.; Fauci, Anthony S. (eds.). Harrison's Infectious Diseases (3rd ed.). New York: McGraw Hill Education. pp. 678–687. ISBN 978-1-259-83597-1.)	Pediculus humanus corporis body louse (B. recurrentis only) and Ornithodoros soft ticks	Relapsing fever	Penicillin, tetracycline, doxycycline	Avoid areas where ticks are found Better access to washing facilities Reduce crowding Pesticides
Brucella	B. abortus B. canis B. melitensis B. suis	Direct contact with infected animal Oral, by ingestion of unpasteurized milk or milk products	Brucellosis: mainly fever, muscular pain and night sweats	Doxycycline streptomycin or gentamicin	
Campylobacter jejuni		Fecal–oral from animals (mammals and fowl); Uncooked meat (especially poultry); Contaminated water	Enteritis, bloody diarrhea; Guillain–Barré syndrome (muscle weakness)	Treat symptoms Fluoroquinolone such as ciprofloxacin in severe cases	Good hygiene Avoiding contaminated water Pasteurizing milk and milk products Cooking meat (especially poultry)
Chlamydia	C. pneumoniae	Respiratory droplets	Atypical pneumonia	Doxycycline; Erythromycin	None
Chlamydia	C. trachomatis	vaginal sex oral sex anal sex Vertical from mother to newborn(ICN); Direct or contaminated surfaces and flies (trachoma)	Trachoma; Neonatal conjunctivitis Neonatal pneumonia Nongonococcal urethritis (NGU); Urethritis; Pelvic inflammatory disease Epididymitis; Prostatitis; Lymphogranuloma venereum (LGV)	Erythromycin (adults) Doxycycline (infants and pregnant women)	Erythromycin or silver nitrate in newborn's eyes Safe sex Abstinence
Chlamydophila psittaci		Inhalation of dust with secretions or feces from birds (e.g. parrots)	Psittacosis, mainly atypical pneumonia	Tetracycline; Doxycycline; Erythromycin	-
Clostridium	C. botulinum	Spores from soil, persevere in canned food, smoked fish and honey	Botulism: Mainly muscle weakness and paralysis	Antitoxin; Penicillin; Hyperbaric oxygen Mechanical ventilation	Proper food preservation techniques
Clostridium	C. difficile	Gut flora, overgrowing when other flora is depleted	Pseudomembranous colitis	Discontinuing responsible antibiotic Vancomycin or metronidazole if severe	Fecal bacteriotherapy
Clostridium	C. perfringens	Spores in soil Vaginal flora and gut flora	Anaerobic cellulitis Gas gangrene Acute food poisoning	Gas gangrene: Debridement or amputation Hyperbaric medicine High doses of doxycycline or penicillin G and clindamycin Food poisoning: Supportive care is sufficient	Appropriate food handling
Clostridium	C. tetani	Spores in soil, skin penetration through wounds	Tetanus: muscle spasms	Tetanus immune globulin Sedatives; Muscle relaxants Mechanical ventilation Penicillin or metronidazole	Tetanus vaccine (such as in the DPT vaccine)
Corynebacterium diphtheriae		respiratory droplets part of human flora	Diphtheria: Fever, sore throat and neck swelling, potentially narrowing airways.	Horse serum antitoxin Erythromycin; Penicillin	DPT vaccine
Ehrlichia	E. canis E. chaffeensis	Dog tick	Ehrlichiosis: headache, muscle aches, and fatigue	Doxycycline; Rifampin	
Enterococcus	E. faecalis E. faecium	Part of gut flora, opportunistic or entering through GI tract or urinary system wounds	Bacterial endocarditis, biliary tract infections, urinary tract infections	Ampicillin (combined with aminoglycoside in endocarditis) Vancomycin	No vaccine Hand washing and other nosocomial prevention
Escherichia	E. coli (generally)	Gut flora, and in urinary tract; Spreading extraintestinally or proliferating in the GI tract	Diarrhea; Urinary tract infections (UTI); Meningitis in infants; Hospital-acquired pneumonia; Hospital-acquired sepsis	UTI: (resistance-tests are required first): Co-trimoxazole; Fluoroquinolone, e.g. ciprofloxacin; Meningitis: Cephalosporin (e.g. cefotaxime) and gentamicin combination; Diarrhea: Antibiotics above shorten duration; Electrolyte and fluid replacement	(no vaccine or preventive drug): Cooking ground beef and pasteurizing milk against O157:H7; Hand washing and disinfection
Escherichia	Enterotoxigenic E. coli (ETEC)	Fecal–oral through food and water; Direct physical contact	Traveller's diarrhea	UTI: (resistance-tests are required first): Co-trimoxazole; Fluoroquinolone, e.g. ciprofloxacin; Meningitis: Cephalosporin (e.g. cefotaxime) and gentamicin combination; Diarrhea: Antibiotics above shorten duration; Electrolyte and fluid replacement	(no vaccine or preventive drug): Cooking ground beef and pasteurizing milk against O157:H7; Hand washing and disinfection
Escherichia	Enteropathogenic E. coli	Vertical, in utero or at birth	Diarrhea in infants	UTI: (resistance-tests are required first): Co-trimoxazole; Fluoroquinolone, e.g. ciprofloxacin; Meningitis: Cephalosporin (e.g. cefotaxime) and gentamicin combination; Diarrhea: Antibiotics above shorten duration; Electrolyte and fluid replacement	(no vaccine or preventive drug): Cooking ground beef and pasteurizing milk against O157:H7; Hand washing and disinfection
Escherichia	Enteroinvasive E.coli (EIEC)	Fecal–oral	bloody diarrhea and fever	UTI: (resistance-tests are required first): Co-trimoxazole; Fluoroquinolone, e.g. ciprofloxacin; Meningitis: Cephalosporin (e.g. cefotaxime) and gentamicin combination; Diarrhea: Antibiotics above shorten duration; Electrolyte and fluid replacement	(no vaccine or preventive drug): Cooking ground beef and pasteurizing milk against O157:H7; Hand washing and disinfection
Escherichia	Enterohemorrhagic (EHEC), including E. coli O157:H7	Reservoir in cattle	bloody diarrhea; Hemolytic-uremic syndrome	UTI: (resistance-tests are required first): Co-trimoxazole; Fluoroquinolone, e.g. ciprofloxacin; Meningitis: Cephalosporin (e.g. cefotaxime) and gentamicin combination; Diarrhea: Antibiotics above shorten duration; Electrolyte and fluid replacement	(no vaccine or preventive drug): Cooking ground beef and pasteurizing milk against O157:H7; Hand washing and disinfection
Francisella tularensis		vector-borne by arthropods; Infected wild or domestic animals, birds or house pets	Tularemia: Fever, ulceration at entry site and/or lymphadenopathy. Can cause severe pneumonia.	Streptomycin; Gentamicin	Avoiding insect vectors; Precautions when handling wild animals or animal products
Haemophilus influenzae		Droplet contact; Human flora of e.g. upper respiratory tract	Bacterial meningitis; Upper respiratory tract infections; Pneumonia, bronchitis; Septic arthritis in infants	Meningitis: (resistance-tests are required first): Third generation cephalosporin, e.g. cefotaxime or ceftriaxone; Ampicillin and sulbactam combination	Hib vaccine to infants; Rifampin prophylactically
Helicobacter pylori		Colonizing stomach; Unclear person-to-person transmission	Peptic ulcer; Chronic gastritis; Risk factor for gastric carcinoma and gastric B-cell lymphoma	Tetracycline, metronidazole and bismuth salt combination	(No vaccine or preventive drug)
Klebsiella pneumoniae		Mouth, skin, and gut flora.; Pneumonia upon aspiration	Klebsiella pneumonia, with significant lung necrosis and hemoptysis; Hospital-acquired urinary tract infection and sepsis	3rd generation cephalosporin; Ciprofloxacin	hand hygiene.
Legionella pneumophila		Droplet contact, from e.g. cooling towers, humidifiers, air conditioners and water distribution systems	Legionnaires' disease; Pontiac fever	Macrolides, such as erythromycin; Fluoroquinolones; Rifampin	(no vaccine or preventive drug) Heating water
Leptospira species		Food and water contaminated by urine from infected wild or domestic animals. Leptospira survives for weeks in fresh water and moist soil.	Leptospirosis: Headaches, muscle pains, and fevers; possible jaundice, kidney failure, pulmonary hemorrhage, and meningitis.	Doxycycline for mild cases; Intravenous penicillin for severe cases	Vaccine not widely used: Doxycycline; Prevention of exposure: Rodent control
Listeria monocytogenes		Raw milk or cheese, ground meats, poultry; Vertically to newborn or fetus	Listeriosis: Meningitis; Sepsis	Ampicillin; Co-trimoxazole	(no vaccine): Proper food preparation and handling
Mycobacterium	M. leprae	Prolonged human-human contact, e.g. through exudates from skin lesions to abrasion of other person	Leprosy (Hansen's disease): granulomas of the nerves, respiratory tract, skin, and eyes.	Tuberculoid form: Dapsone and rifampin; Lepromatous form: Clofazimine	BCG vaccine shows some effects
Mycobacterium	M. tuberculosis	Droplet contact	Tuberculosis: chronic cough with blood-containing sputum, fever, night sweats, and weight loss	(Difficult, see Tuberculosis treatment for more details) Standard "short" course: First 2 months, combination: Isoniazid; Rifampicin; Pyrazinamide; Ethambutol; Further 4 months, combination: Isoniazid; Rifampicin	BCG vaccine; Isoniazid
Mycoplasma pneumoniae		Human flora; Respiratory droplets	Mycoplasma pneumonia	Doxycycline and erythromycin	
Neisseria	N. gonorrhoeae	Sexually transmitted; vertical in birth	Gonorrhea; Urethritis (men); Pelvic inflammatory disease (women); Ophthalmia neonatorum; Septic arthritis	Uncomplicated gonorrhea: Ceftriaxone; Tetracycline, e.g. doxycycline if also chlamydia is suspected; Spectinomycin for resistance or patient allergy to cephalosporin; Ophthalmia neonatorum: Erythromycin + ceftriaxone	(No vaccine): Safe sex; Erythromycin into eyes of newborn at risk
Neisseria	N. meningitidis	Droplet transmission	Meningococcal disease including meningitis; Sepsis, including Waterhouse-Friderichsen syndrome	Penicillin G; Ceftriaxone	NmVac4-A/C/Y/W-135 vaccine; Rifampin
Pseudomonas aeruginosa		Opportunistic; Infects damaged tissues or people with immunodeficiency.	Pseudomonas infection: Pneumonia; Urinary tract infection; Corneal infection; Endocarditis; Osteomyelitis; Burn wound infection; Sepsis; Malignant external otitis	Anti-pseudomonal penicillins such as ticarcillin; Aminoglycoside	(no vaccine): Topical silver sulfadiazine for burn wounds
Nocardia asteroides		In soil	Nocardiosis: Pneumonia, endocarditis, keratitis, neurological or lymphocutaneous infection	TMP/SMX	
Rickettsia rickettsii		Wood or dog tick	Rocky mountain spotted fever	Doxycycline; Chloramphenicol	(no preventive drug or approved vaccine): Vector control, such as clothing; Prompt removal of attached ticks
Salmonella	S typhi	Fecal–oral route, through food or water	Typhoid fever type salmonellosis (fever, abdominal pain, hepatosplenomegaly, rose spots); Chronic carrier state	Ceftriaxone; Fluoroquinolones, e.g. ciprofloxacin	Ty21a and ViCPS vaccines; Hygiene and food preparation
Salmonella	Other Salmonella species e.g. S. typhimurium	Fecal–oral; Food contaminated by fowl (e.g. uncooked eggs) or turtles	Salmonellosis with gastroenteritis; Paratyphoid fever; Osteomyelitis in people with sickle cells; Sepsis	Fluid and electrolyte replacement for diarrhea; Antibiotics (in neonates and immuno-compromised): Ciprofloxacin; Ceftriaxone; TMP/SMX; Azithromycin	(No vaccine or preventive drug): Proper sewage disposal; Food preparation; Good personal hygiene
Shigella	S. sonnei S. dysenteriae	Fecal–oral	Shigellosis (bacillary dysentery)	Fluid and electrolyte replacement; Fluoroquinolone such as ciprofloxacin if severe	Protection of water and food supplies; Vaccines are in trial stage
Staphylococcus	aureus	Human flora on mucosae in e.g. anterior nares, skin and vagina, entering through wound	Coagulase-positive staphylococcal infections: Skin infections, including impetigo; Acute infective endocarditis; Septis; Necrotizing pneumonia; Meningitis; Osteomyelitis; Toxinoses; Scalded skin syndrome; Toxic shock syndrome; Staphylococcal food poisoning	Incision and drainage of localized lesions; Nafcillin, oxacillin, methicillin; Vancomycin for Methicillin-resistant (MRSA)	(no vaccine or preventive drug): Barrier precautions, washing hands and fomite disinfection in hospitals
Staphylococcus	epidermidis	Human flora in skin, anterior nares and mucous membranes	Infections of implanted prostheses (e.g. heart valves and joints) and catheters	Vancomycin	None
Staphylococcus	saprophyticus	Part of normal vaginal flora	Cystitis in women	TMP/SMX or norfloxacin	None
Streptococcus	agalactiae	Human flora in vagina, urethral mucous membranes, rectum: Vertically during childbirth; Sexually	Neonatal meningitis; Neonatal sepsis; Neonatal pneumonia; Endometritis in postpartum women; Opportunistic infections with sepsis and pneumonia	Penicillin G; Aminoglycoside in case of lethal infection	None
Streptococcus	pneumoniae	Respiratory droplets; Human flora in nasopharynx (spreading in immunocompromised)	Acute bacterial pneumonia & meningitis in adults; Otitis media and sinusitis in children; Sepsis	Penicillin G	23-serotype vaccine for adults (PPV); Heptavalent conjugated vaccine for children (PCV)
Streptococcus	pyogenes	Respiratory droplets; Direct physical contact with impetigo lesions	Streptococcal pharyngitis; Sepsis; Scarlet fever; Rheumatic fever; Impetigo and erysipelas; Puerperal fever; Necrotizing fasciitis; Poststreptococcal glomerulonephritis	Penicillin G or V; Macrolide, e.g. clarithromycin or erythromycin in penicillin allergy; Drainage and debridement for necrotizing fasciitis	No vaccine: Rapid antibiotic treatment helps prevent rheumatic fever
Streptococcus	viridans	Oral flora, penetration through abrasions	Subacute bacterial endocarditis; Dental cavities; Abscesses of brain and liver	Penicillin G	
Treponema pallidum subspecies pallidum		Sexual; Vertical (from mother to fetus)	Syphilis: First a chancre, (a painless skin ulceration), then diffuse rash. Later: gummas (soft growths), neurological, or heart symptoms.; Congenital syphilis	Penicillin G; Doxycycline if penicillin allergy	Penicillin offered to recent sexual partners; Antibiotics to pregnant women if risk of transmitting to child; No vaccine available; Safe sex
Vibrio cholerae		Fecal–oral route; Contaminated water and raw seafood	Cholera: Severe "rice water" diarrhea	Fluid and electrolyte replacement; Doxycycline	Proper sanitation; Adequate food preparation
Yersinia pestis		Fleas from animals; Ingestion of animal tissues; Respiratory droplets	Plague: Bubonic plague; Pneumonic plague	Streptomycin primarily; Tetracyclin; Supportive therapy for shock	Plague vaccine; Minimize exposure to rodents and fleas

== Genetic transformation ==
Of the 59 species listed in the table with their clinical characteristics, 11 species (or 19%) are known to be capable of natural genetic transformation. Natural transformation is a bacterial adaptation for transferring DNA from one cell to another. This process includes the uptake of exogenous DNA from a donor cell by a recipient cell and its incorporation into the recipient cell's genome by recombination. Transformation appears to be an adaptation for repairing damage in the recipient cell's DNA. Among pathogenic bacteria, transformation capability likely serves as an adaptation that facilitates survival and infectivity. The pathogenic bacteria able to carry out natural genetic transformation (of those listed in the table) are Campylobacter jejuni, Enterococcus faecalis, Haemophilus influenzae, Helicobacter pylori, Klebsiella pneumoniae, Legionella pneumophila, Neisseria gonorrhoeae, Neisseria meningitidis, Staphylococcus aureus, Streptococcus pneumoniae and Vibrio cholerae.

== See also ==
- Human microbiome project
- List of antibiotics
- Pathogenic viruses
