= Leptospira wolffii =

Scientific classification
- Domain: Bacteria
- Kingdom: Pseudomonadati
- Phylum: Spirochaetota
- Class: Spirochaetia
- Order: Leptospirales
- Family: Leptospiraceae
- Genus: Leptospira
- Species: L. wolffii

Binomial name
- Leptospira wolffii Slack et al., 2008

Synonyms
- Leptospira wolffi Hussain et al., 1978

Species of bacterium

Leptospira wolffii is a gram negative aerobic bacterium in the spirochaete phylum. The species named after Dutch bacteriologist Jan Willem Wolff.

== Description ==
As with other species in the phylum, L. wolffii has a spiral shape and uses its endoflagella for movement. Within the genus of Leptospira, L. wolffii falls within the intermediate or opportunistic pathogen clade. The microbe is 10-13 μM long and 0.2 μM wide, making difficult to see unless using dark-field microscopy, so genetic analysis is a common means of identification.

== Pathogeny ==
Leptospira wolffii was first identified in Thailand from a patient's urine sample, who had contracted leptospirosis in 2008. L.wolffii is classified as an intermediate Leptospira, along with L. inadai, L. fainei, L. broomii, and L. licerasiae, meaning it can be carried by a host asymptomatically or cause the disease leptospirosis. When causing illness L. wolffii, like pathogenic Leptospira, can infect a host and spread to various organs including the kidneys where the microbe is shed in the urine. In turn, L. wolffii spreads to other hosts coming into contact with infected urine or contaminated water or soil. Cases of leptospirosis have been caused by L. wolffii have been identified in Central, Southeast, and East Asia carried by humans, dogs, sheep, and other mammals. Since Leptospira can infect a variety of hosts between species it is a problematic anthropozoonotic disease.
