= Leptospira mayottensis =

Scientific classification
- Domain: Bacteria
- Kingdom: Pseudomonadati
- Phylum: Spirochaetota
- Class: Spirochaetia
- Order: Leptospirales
- Family: Leptospiraceae
- Genus: Leptospira
- Species: L. mayottensis

Binomial name
- Leptospira mayottensis Bourhy, Collet, Brisse, and Picardeau (2014)

Leptospira mayottensis is a pathogenic species of Leptospira in the family Leptospiracea. As causative agents of Leptospirosis they primarily infect humans, livestock, dogs, and small mammals. They are endemic to the island of Mayotte located in the Indian ocean, as well as being found in Madagascar. L. mayottensis is closely related to Leptospira borgpetersenii.

L. mayottensis was first isolated from patient samples in Mayotte. Originally L. mayottensis was identified as an L. borgpetersenii-like phylogenetic group (Leptospira borgpetersenii B). However based upon rRNA 16s sequencing they were determined to be their own species. In addition to being isolated from humans, L. mayottensis has also been isolated from the small mammals Microgale cowani, Rattus rattus, and Tenrec ecaudatus. The level of diversity from isolates derived from Madagascar compared to Mayotte may indicate L. mayottensis originated from Madagascar.

== Genome ==
The genome of L. mayottensis is around 4.1 Mbp in size and consists of two chromosomes. Chromosome 1 is 3.8 Mbp, while the second chromosome is smaller at around 300 Kbp. The L. mayottensis genome has a GC content of 39.5%.

=== pMaORI ===
pMaORI is a replicative plasmid used to genetically manipulate pathogenic leptospires, as well as saprophytic species. The plasmid was constructed by combining the E. coli plasmid, pMAT, with a genomic island isolated from L. mayottensis strain 200901116.

== Biology ==
=== Morphology ===
The morphology of leptospires is similar across species. L. mayottensis are helical, with wavelength and amplitude both around 0.5 μm. Cells have a diameter of around 0.2 μm, and length of ±9.21 μm. They additionally have the 'hooked end' often associated with Leptospira.
