= Leptospira meyeri =

Scientific classification
- Domain: Bacteria
- Kingdom: Pseudomonadati
- Phylum: Spirochaetota (Spirochaetes)
- Class: Spirochaetia
- Order: Leptospirales
- Family: Leptospiraceae
- Genus: Leptospira
- Species: L. meyeri

Binomial name
- Leptospira meyeri Yasuda et al., 1987

Species of bacterium

Leptospira meyeri is a saprophytic species of Leptospira.
