= Leptospira alstonii =

Scientific classification
- Domain: Bacteria
- Kingdom: Pseudomonadati
- Phylum: Spirochaetota
- Class: Spirochaetia
- Order: Leptospirales
- Family: Leptospiraceae
- Genus: Leptospira
- Species: L. alstonii

Binomial name
- Leptospira alstonii Smythe et al. 2013

Mobile spirochete

Leptospira alstonii is a gram negative, mobile, spirochete. It is flexible, helical, and motile by means of two periplasmic flagella (axial fibrils). It is obligately aerobic and oxidase positive. It was named after J. M. Alston, a British microbiologist who made significant contributions to the study of Leptospirosis. It is one of nine human or animal pathogenic species of Leptospira. It was originally isolated from material submitted to the Veterinary Diagnostic Laboratory at Iowa State University during an outbreak of swine abortion in 1983. It has been isolated and stored in liquid nitrogen or Ellinghausen-McCullough-Johnson-Harris medium. It also has been isolated in China from a frog. The strain is also available from culture collections of the WHO collaborating centers. Lipase is not produced by this species. NaCl is not required for growth. Growth is inhibited by 8-azaguanine at 225 μg/mL or 2,6-diaminopurine (10 μg/mL) and copper sulfate. It contains serovars from the serogroup ranarum. DNA G+C content is 39±8 mol%.
