= Leptospira alexanderi =

Scientific classification
- Domain: Bacteria
- Kingdom: Pseudomonadati
- Phylum: Spirochaetota
- Class: Spirochaetia
- Order: Leptospirales
- Family: Leptospiraceae
- Genus: Leptospira
- Species: L. alexanderi

Binomial name
- Leptospira alexanderi Brenner et al. 1999

Species of bacterium

Leptospira alexanderi is a species of Leptospira. Its type strain is strain L 60^{T} (= ATCC 700520^{T}).
