= Leptospira kirschneri =

Scientific classification
- Domain: Bacteria
- Kingdom: Pseudomonadati
- Phylum: Spirochaetota
- Class: Spirochaetia
- Order: Leptospirales
- Family: Leptospiraceae
- Genus: Leptospira
- Species: L. kirschneri

Binomial name
- Leptospira kirschneri Ramadass et al., 1992

Species of bacterium

Leptospira kirschneri is a Gram negative, obligate aerobe species of spirochete bacteria named for University of Otago bacteriologist Dr. Leopold Kirschner. It is a member of the genus Leptospira. The species is pathogenic and can cause leptospirosis, most commonly in pigs.
