= Leptospira biflexa =

Scientific classification
- Domain: Bacteria
- Kingdom: Pseudomonadati
- Phylum: Spirochaetota
- Class: Spirochaetia
- Order: Leptospirales
- Family: Leptospiraceae
- Genus: Leptospira
- Species: L. biflexa

Binomial name
- Leptospira biflexa (Wolbach and Binger 1914) Noguchi 1918 (Approved Lists 1980)

Species of bacterium

Leptospira biflexa is a spirochaete bacterium in the genus Leptospira and was the first saprophytic Leptospira genome to be sequenced.

== Morphology and physiology ==
Leptospira biflexa are a helix shaped bacterium containing periplasmic flagella that allow for high motility and can contribute to virulence in pathogenic species and colonization of diverse environments. Studies have identified five bactofilin proteins associated with cytoskeletal properties that are conserved across Leptospiraceae. The LbbD protein family was found to influence the helical pitch distance and the helical structure of L. biflexa; in turn an impact on motility and ability to tolerate cell wall stress was observed.

== Importance ==
Leptospira biflexa are a species of genus Leptospira consisting of pathogenic and free living saprophytic bacterial species. L. biflexa is a free-living saprophytic spirochete that survives exclusively in external environments and was the first saprophytic Leptospira genome to be sequenced unveiling a total of 3,590 protein-coding genes distributed across three circular replicons. Due to the fast growth rate and ease of genetic manipulation the use of this model bacterium species allows insight to gene functions within Leptospira. L. biflexa contains a mechanical barrier of lipopolysaccharides within the outer membrane to defend against hydrophilic agents and toxic compounds. A study conducted found that there are 29 genes associated with the mutagenic EtBr sensitivity within L. biflexa. The sigma-54 was found to control genes involved in nitrogen uptake and metabolism including amtB1, glnB-amtB2, ntrX and narK which contribute to the long-term environmental survival of Leptospira spp.
