= Leopold Kirschner =

Austro-Hungarian, Dutch, and New Zealand bacteriologist

Leopold Kirschner (born 12 May 1889, died 23 November 1970) was an Austro-Hungarian, Dutch, and New Zealand bacteriologist specializing in leptospirosis. He is known for his work on the survival of Leptospira spp in the environment, research on conditions and media for Leptospira growth, his role in the initial discoveries of leptospirosis in New Zealand, for early epidemiologic descriptions of leptospirosis as an occupational disease of dairy farmers, and for the major pathogenic Leptospira species, Leptospira kirschneri, that was named in his honor.

== Early life and education ==
Kirschner was born in Andrichau, near Bielitz, in the Austro-Hungarian Empire, (present-day Andrychów, Poland) to Jewish parents. He studied medicine in Vienna. Kirschner's studies were interrupted by service in the medical corps during World War One. Following the fall of the Austro-Hungarian Empire, Kirschner followed Professor Robert Doerr, an experimental pathologist, to Amsterdam for further studies at the Koninklijk Instituut voor de Tropen (KIT), the Dutch Royal Tropical Institute. KIT housed the first leptospirosis reference laboratory in Europe.

== Career and research ==
=== Pasteur Institute, Bandung, Dutch East Indies ===
In 1921 Kirschner joined the Pasteur Institute at Bandung, Java, in the Dutch East Indies (present-day Indonesia) where he served as Deputy Director of the Institute under Louis Otten. The Institute was responsible for preparing vaccines and carrying out diagnostic services for 70 million people. While there, Kirschner undertook important work on the survival in the environment of the bacteria that causes leptospirosis, and he and a colleague developed an effective vaccine against plague, testing early versions on themselves. Kirschner’s work in Java was cut short by the Japanese invasion in 1942. He and wife Alice, a gifted violinist from Vienna, survived and provided considerable covert assistance to other prisoners using his scientific knowledge.

=== University of Otago, Dunedin, New Zealand ===
Kirschner was recruited to the University of Otago Medical School by Dr – later Sir – Charles Hercus in 1946, to the Medical Research Council Microbiology Unit. At the time of his arrival, New Zealand was considered to be free of leptospirosis, an assumption based in part on the absence of native terrestrial mammalian hosts. However, Kirschner noted that many mammalian species that could serve as hosts of Leptospira spp had been introduced to New Zealand, and that measures at ports to prevent rats being imported on ships were weak. Kirschner hypothesized that leptospirosis was very likely to be present and responsible for febrile illness among farmers in New Zealand. He established a leptospirosis reference laboratory at the University of Otago Medical School, confirming with Dr – later Sir – Edward G. Sayers, future Dean of the Otago Medical School, human leptospirosis in New Zealand for the first time in a sharemilker from Auckland in 1949. Then with Mr – later Professor – A. Neil Bruère the first livestock and occupational disease outbreak among dairy farm workers in Westland in 1951. Kirschner promoted close collaboration between human and animal health experts, known today as the ‘One Health’ approach. Kirschner and colleagues went on to describe the major leptospirosis problem among dairy farmers in New Zealand; studied factors supporting and inhibiting Leptospira growth; and procedures for the culture, isolation, and identification Leptospira. Kirschner was an important early influence on the career of a generation of leptospirosis experts, including Professor Solomon Faine, Monash University, and Professor Roger Marshall, Massey University. Kirschner died in Dunedin on 23 November 1970 and is buried with wife Alice Kirschner at the Dunedin Southern Cemetery.

== Honors and recognition ==
In 1992 Marshall and colleagues named the major pathogenic Leptospira species Leptospira kirschneri for Kirschner. A portrait of Kirschner is displayed in the Department of Microbiology and Immunology, 8th Floor, Microbiology Building, University of Otago, and a plaque commemorates the site of his laboratory at room 304, Hercus Building, University of Otago, Dunedin, New Zealand.

Dr. Kirschner is recognised in the naming of the Dr. Leopold Kirschner database of Leptospira species and serovar isolations and detections from animals worldwide hosted by the University of Otago.
