= Solomon Faine =

New Zealand-born microbiologist (1926–2021)

Solomon Faine (17 August 1926 – 4 February 2021) was a New Zealand-born microbiologist known for his research on leptospirosis. With Dr. Leopold Kirschner, Faine made early epidemiologic descriptions of leptospirosis as an occupational disease of dairy farmers in New Zealand. The intermediate Leptospira species Leptospira fainei is named in his honor.

== Early life and education ==
Faine was born in Wellington, New Zealand, on 17 August 1926. He graduated BMedSci in 1946 and MB ChB in 1949 from University of Otago. He obtained his DPhil from University of Oxford in 1955 on the virulence of Leptospira icterohaemorrhagiae. He received his MD on virulence in Leptospira from the University of Otago Medical School in 1958 in the Microbiology Unit with Dr. Leopold Kirschner. He was a Fellow of the Royal College of Pathologists of Australasia (FRCPA).

== Career and research ==
Faine's academic career at the University of Otago started as Assistant Lecturer in Bacteriology, a position that he held from 1950 to 1952. In 1953 he was promoted to Lecturer and then to Lecturer in Microbiology, remaining at the University of Otago until 1958. In 1959 he was appointed Senior Lecturer in Bacteriology, University of Sydney, and in 1963 was promoted to associate professor of Clinical Bacteriology, University of Sydney, a position that he held until 1967. In 1968 he was appointed Professor of Microbiology and chair, Department of Microbiology, Monash University, Melbourne, Australia. He held this position until 1991, and in 1992 was made Emeritus Professor, Monash University until his death in 2021.

== Awards and honors ==
Faine was awarded the Peter Bancroft Prize for Research, University of Sydney, 1965. In 1998 Perolat and colleagues named the intermediate Leptospira species Leptospira fainei for Dr. Faine. In 2000 he was awarded the Vincenzo Marcolongo Memorial Lectureship.

== Publications ==
Solomon Faine publications indexed by PubMed.
