= Leptospira noguchii =

Scientific classification
- Domain: Bacteria
- Kingdom: Pseudomonadati
- Phylum: Spirochaetota
- Class: Spirochaetia
- Order: Leptospirales
- Family: Leptospiraceae
- Genus: Leptospira
- Species: L. noguchii

Binomial name
- Leptospira noguchii Yasuda et al., 1987

Species of bacterium

Leptospira noguchii is a gram-negative, pathogenic organism named for Japanese bacteriologist Dr. Hideyo Noguchi who named the genus Leptospira. L. noguchii is famous for causing the febrile illness in Fort Bragg, NC during World War II. There was 40 cases of this fever documented during each summer from 1942 to 1944; however, there were 0 deaths recorded from this outbreak. Unlike other strains of Leptospira that cause leptospirosis, L. noguchii is characterized by showing a pretibial rash on the victim. Its specific epithet recognises Hideyo Noguchi.

== Background ==
=== Discovery ===
Leptospira noguchii was originally cultured in 1907, but was thought to be Spirochaeta interrogans due to the question mark shape of the cell. However, upon further research on the 16s rRNA Yasuda et al. was able to classify this organism as Leptospira noguchii.

=== Phylogeny ===
Originally, there were only two species classifications of Leptospira. They were categorized as Leptospira interrogans, the pathogenic species, and Leptospira biflexa, the nonpathogenic species. However, in 1989, it was discovered that there were 21 different species of Leptospira. Within these 21 species, Leptospira noguchii was recognized. However, conjugation is very common among the genetic materials making them hard to distinguish individual species.

=== Ecology ===
Leptospira noguchii can grow in stagnant water, and is known to grow optimally between 28 °C - 30 °C at a pH between 7.2 and 7.6. L. noguchii is also known to have a parasitic relationship and grow in host's kidneys. It can be isolated from urine, blood, and cerebrospinal fluid.

== Characteristics ==
Leptospira noguchii are spirochete-shaped, gram-negative bacterium that typically range from 0.1 μm by 6 μm to 0.1 μm to 20 μm. Leptospira noguchii also lacks glycolipids in their peptidoglycan and contain diaminopimelic acid. L. noguchii is a motile organism due to having amphitrichous flagella on opposing ends of each other. Leptospira organisms can be cultured in Ellinghausen-McCullough-Johnson-Harris medium at 30 °C. Due to Leptospira’s morphology, researchers typically use dark-field microscopy as opposed to Light-field microscopy because the amphitrichous flagella produce quick movements along the microscope that are hard to see on a light-field microscope.

== Metabolism ==
Leptospira noguchii is a chemoorganotrophic organism. The metabolism of L. noguchii is unusual due to the fact that the main source of energy and carbon comes from beta-oxidation of long-chained fatty acids. An interesting fact about Leptospira noguchii is that it the ability to process glucose; however, this is not its preferred way to obtain energy, though it has the necessary enzymes to perform this process. This organism is also able to use the respiratory electron transport chain due to being an aerobic organism that can also survive in microaerophilic environments. The characteristic of being aerobic allows this organism to perform oxidative phosphorylation in order to produce ATP for energy.

== Genomics ==
Leptospira noguchii has a low GC content of 35.63% while the genome size is 4.76 Mbp. The sequencing of the genome was accomplished using BASys, which is bacterial annotation system. There are a total of 4,535 coding sequences within L. noguchii's genome that have been identified.

== Fort Bragg, North Carolina outbreak ==
In the summer of 1942, Fort Bragg, NC endured an outbreak of a sickness which presented with malaise, general aches and pains, headaches, and post-orbital pains. 40 patients came in with these similar symptoms. Upon obtaining information about their recent actions, locations, and barracks, most patients said that they recently swam in lakes close to the Fort Bragg military complex. In about 95% of the patients presented with Splenomegaly in the early stages, and then on the fourth day a pretibial rash presented in most of the patients. While the patients were recovering, the doctors taking care of the soldier were stumped by the pathogen after the differential diagnosis. At the request of the doctors, the Surgeon General was petitioned by the U.S. army to send others to help research the unidentified pathogen.

Dr. Norman H. Topping, Maj. Cornelius B. Phillips, and Dr. John R. Paul all were sent to investigate the pathogen. They concluded that the pathogen was water-borne and not transferred by any kind of insect. In 1944, Capt. Hugh Tatlock finally completed a transfer of the pathogen to a mammal, causing them to figure out that the pathogen is only transferable between mammals. In 1945, Capt. Tatlock finally thought he classified the pathogen as a virus. Later, in 1951, when the necessary technology became available to perform agglutination tests and cross-reference agglutination tests, they found that it was a species of the genus Leptospira. At the time, the pathogen was thought to be called Leptospira Autumnalis, but upon further study of the whole-genome, it was later reclassified as a serovar of Leptospira noguchii. This Leptospirosis became known as “Fort Bragg Fever.”

== Isolation of main pathogenic strains ==
Strain	Serovar	Isolated From
Hook	Australis	Canine
Fort Bragg	Autumnalis	Homo sapiens
Bonito	Autumnalis	Homo sapiens
Cascata	Bataviae	Homo sapiens

=== Bonito Strain ===
The Bonito strain of L. noguchii was isolated from a 34-year-old man in Brazil that was suffering from Leptospirosis. The man is suspected to have contracted this disease through interaction with rats, dogs, and other farm animals. The man was taken to the Hospital Santa Casa de Misericórdia, Pelotas, and his lab results showed an elevated bilirubin level. This strain was able to be isolated from a blood culture at the hospital.

=== Cascata Strain ===
This strain was initially obtained form a 16-year-old boy in Brazil via a blood culture. This patient also reported being around rats and dogs; however, he was not hospitalized for his illness.

=== Hook Strain ===
This strain was isolated from a dog found in Brazil that appeared to be suffering from anorexia. The dog died form this strain of L. noguchii, and the symptoms present were slightly different than when humans were infected. The dog presented with disorientation, diarrhea, vomiting, anorexia, and lethargy. The Hook strain was isolated from the kidney tissue, as this is where L. noguchii typically resides in its host.

== Pathogenesis ==
Leptospira noguchii is another pathogenic bacteria that causes Leptospirosis. Leptospirosis can be transferred in a multitude of ways. Leptospirosis can transfer from animals to humans (zoonosis), humans to humans, or animals to animals via intake of contaminated body fluids, such as urine and blood. The disease is normally absorbed through the mucous membranes of another animal or human and is excreted from the body in the urine. The infected individual can be asymptomatic or have very severe symptoms. In serious cases, kidney or liver failure, aseptic meningitis, and fatal pulmonary hemorrhages have occurred in humans.

=== Entry ===
As it enters through the mucous membranes or abrasions on the skin, its travels in your bloodstream to your kidney's renal tubing, where it stays an enters the incubation period. A unique adaptation of Leptospira noguchii is that it can complete translational movement in thick liquids, giving it the ability to penetrate deep tissue.

=== Attachment ===
Leptospira noguchii attaches in the urinary tract through the use of immunoglobulin-like proteins LigA and LigB, endostatin-like proteins, and the membrane protein LipL32.

=== Virulence Factors ===
Pathogenic Leptospira spp. has features of both a gram-positive and gram-negative pathogen. Features of the gram-negative pathogen is the presences of lipopolysaccharides (LPS), but the closeness of the cytoplasmic membrane to the cell wall shows more of a gram-positive feature. Also, the virulence factors on the flagella of pathogenic leptospires have thought to be involved in the overall infection. Leptospira noguchii specifically creates a median lethal dose (LD_{50}) of three to 100 leptospires. L. noguchii also uses the Lsa24 protein to avoid the immune system of the host and antibacterials by binding to factor H. While the most important virulence factor has not yet been identified, some of the other proteins that are considered to be contributors to the main virulence are hemolysins, more specifically phospholipase C, sphingomylinase-like proteins, and pore-forming proteins.

=== Symptoms ===
The disease typically begins with fever, and will then lead to other symptoms.

The symptoms in humans include: High fever (102 °F-104 °F), headache, chills, muscle aches, vomiting, jaundice, conjunctivitis, abdominal pain, diarrhea, and a pretibial rash. Some complications are Weil's syndrome which is a multi-system organ complication causing jaundice, meningitis, pulmonary hemorrhage, hepatic and renal dysfunction, and cardiovascular collapse.

=== Treatment ===
Leptospira noguchii is very sensitive to a large number of antibiotics. The common antibiotics used are: Beta-lactams (penicillin, ampicillin, and amoxycillin), Rifampin, Tetracycline, Doxycycline, Cephalosporins, Aminoglycosides, Macrolides (erythromycin and Azithromycin), and Fluoroquinolones.
