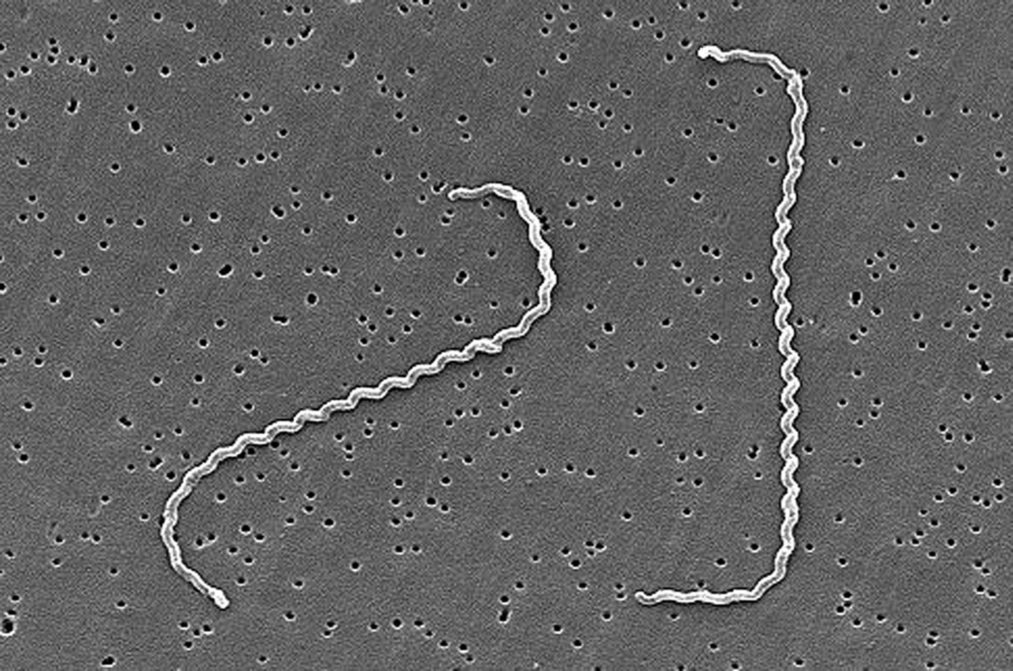
- Scanning electron micrograph of Leptospira interrogans.

Scientific classification
- Domain: Bacteria
- Kingdom: Pseudomonadati
- Phylum: Spirochaetota
- Class: Spirochaetia
- Order: Leptospirales
- Family: Leptospiraceae
- Genus: Leptospira
- Species: L. interrogans

Binomial name
- Leptospira interrogans (Stimson 1907) Wenyon 1926 (Approved Lists 1980)

= Leptospira interrogans =

Species of bacterium

Leptospira interrogans is a thin, P1+, motile, gram-negative, obligate aerobic spirochaete bacterium that belongs to the genus Leptospira in the phylum Spirochaetota. L. interrogans cells are long, helical, and tightly coiled like a corkscrew with hooked and spiraled ends. L. interrogans has many properties that ensure its optimal survival in specific conditions, including two periplasmic flagella located within its outer sheath, enabling the bacteria to move rapidly through a variety of mediums such as water, soil, and host tissue. These flagella enable L. interrogans to more easily access and infect mammalian tissues. The outer membrane of L. interrogans contains unique lipopolysaccharides (LPS) and surface-exposed proteins that play key roles in environmental survival, adhesion, and interaction with host organisms. It is able to metabolize long-chain fatty acids through ꞵ-oxidation as an energy source and uses oxygen as a terminal electron acceptor.

L. interrogans is mainly found in warmer tropical regions. The bacteria can live for weeks to months in the ground or water. Leptospira is one of the genera of the spirochaete phylum that causes severe mammalian infections. Although many Leptospira species can cause infection, most of the serious infections are caused by L. interrogans. This species is pathogenic to some wild and domestic animals, including pet dogs. It can also spread to humans through abrasions on the skin with contaminated water or soil, where infection can cause flu-like symptoms with kidney and liver damage.

L. interrogans has a genome that consists of two circular chromosomes. Together, these chromosomes encode genes involved in motility, nutrient acquisition, stress response, and adaptation to different ecological niches.

== History ==
=== Identification and isolation ===
While illnesses consistent with a leptospirosis diagnosis had been described in ancient medical journals as “rice field jaundice” or “autumn fever”, the modern history began with the identification of Weil’s disease, or leptospirosis, in Adolf Weil in 1886 wherein he had been experiencing “a particular type of jaundice accompanied by splenomegaly, renal dysfunction, conjunctivitis, and skin rashes”. The specific causative agent had yet to be identified, but higher rates of infection were seen in those who worked outdoor occupations and came into contact with water, with epidemics common in sewer workers, rice-field workers, and coal miners.

Leptospira were isolated independently and almost simultaneously in Japan and Europe, though the earliest identification of leptospires was done by A.M. Stimson in 1907 using Levaditi silver deposition staining in the kidney tissue of an infected cadaver. Stimson dubbed the organism Spirocheta interrogans because of its resemblance to a question mark due to the characteristic hooked ends of the leptospires. In 1915, Japanese researchers Ryukichi Inada and Yutaka Ido identified the causative agent of Weil’s disease by observing spiral-shaped bacteria in the blood and organs of infected patients and experimentally transmitting the disease to guinea pigs, proving it was caused by a spirochete. They were able to cultivate spirochetes in vitro using a medium made from emulsified guinea pig kidney and developed the first successful antiserum for treatment. This discovery allowed for rapid advancements in this research area as they defined transmissibility, routes of infection, pathological changes, tissue distribution, urinary excretion, leptospiral filterability, morphology, and motility.

In 1917, Inada and Ido identified rats as renal carriers of Leptospira by finding spirochetes in the kidneys of healthy field mice and house rats which was the first observation of an asymptomatic carrier. In the following decades, as advancements in the field occurred, leptospirosis was recognized as an infectious disease affecting almost all mammalian species with ranging severity from mild influenza-like illness to severe, fatal infections with liver and kidney failure. By the 1950s, the number of identified serovars and susceptible host species had grown considerably, and by the 1980s, leptospirosis was firmly established as a veterinary disease of significant economic impact in dogs, cattle, pigs, horses, and possibly sheep.

=== Nomenclature and classification ===
The genus Leptospira was first proposed in 1918 to differentiate the Leptospirosis spirochete from others based on morphology. As serovars were isolated, they were given species status and species were grouped into serogroups based on related antigens. When it was clear that a vast number of serovars existed, the subcommittee on the Taxonomy of Leptospira accepted the idea of two species existing, L. biflexa and L. interrogans, with former containing saprophytic serovars and the latter containing pathogenic serovars. Additional advances in molecular taxonomy led to major revisions in Leptospira classification, with DNA–DNA analysis dividing the former single species L. interrogans into seven distinct species. Leptospira are also classified into serogroups and serovars based on antigenic differences in the LPS surface molecules, with there being at least 25 serogroups and over 300 different serovars. Significant serogroups include Icterohaemorrhagiae, Australis, Canicola, Pomona, and Sejroe and each serogroup is subdivided into multiple serovars.

== Microbiology ==
=== Morphology ===
L. interrogans cells are gram-negative, tightly coiled, motile spirochetes, with two periplasmic flagella. One flagellum is inserted at each end of the bacterium. The cells are thin, about 0.15 μm, and long, between 6-20 μm, with a corkscrew shaped body with spiral or hooked ends. The hooked ends often resemble a question mark, and this is where the name 'interrogans' comes from. The periplasmic flagella are crucial to the bacteria's ability to move and survive in specific host cells. The leptospires reveal two unique forms of movement, translational and non translational.

=== Metabolism and physiology ===
L. interrogans displays neutralophilic properties, growing in a pH range of 7.2 - 7.6, with an optimal pH of 7.4. The bacteria also display mesophilic growth properties and grow at a temperature range of 28 °C to 30 °C. The optimal growth of the obligate aerobe L. interrogans occurs in simple media containing vitamins, salts, and specific long chain fatty acids. Leptospira require ammonium salts as well as long-chain fatty acids for metabolism.

The major energy and carbon source of this organism is the beta-oxidation of long chain fatty acids. L. interrogans must obtain the long chain fatty acids from its surroundings to metabolize them as an energy source. Unique to the metabolic characteristics of L. interrogans, long chain unsaturated fatty acids are required for the bacterium to grow, as saturated fatty acids can only be metabolized in these conditions. L. interrogans contains genes that code for the use of the TCA cycle in its metabolism. L. interrogans transforms fatty acids into acetyl-CoA, then uses acetyl-CoA to produce some ATP through the TCA cycle. The TCA cycle produces the electron carriers necessary for oxidative phosphorylation. L. interrogans main ATP production comes through oxidative phosphorylation. Oxygen serves as the terminal electron acceptor in this beta-oxidation. Hydrogen peroxide (H_{2}O_{2}) may also serve as a terminal electron acceptor, with catalase activity needed for survival of L. interrogans during infection. L. interrogans has only one glucose uptake system, known as the glucose sodium symporter. L. interrogans cannot use glycolysis because it cannot use glucose as it main carbon source. Hence, fatty acid β-oxidation is the microbe's main source of carbon and energy.

L. interrogans has its own Glutathione (GSH) enzymatic pathway and uses the produced GSH as an antioxidant. L. interrogans synthesizes GSH using the enzymes γ-glutamylcysteine synthetase (GCL) and glutathione synthetase (GS). GSH protects the cell from oxidative stress by preventing oxidation and the creation of free radicals.

=== Genomics ===
The L. interrogans genome consists of two circular chromosomes composed of a total of almost 4.7 Mbp. The larger chromosome has a total genome of 4.3 Mbp, and the smaller chromosome has a size of 350 Kbp. It has a G+C content of 35% and contains 3,400-3,700 protein-coding genes, depending on the strain. The genes on the large chromosome encodes mostly housekeeping functions. Unlike most other bacteria, where the rRNA genes are clustered, in Leptospira the 16S, 23S, and 5S rRNA genes are scattered on the large chromosome. Genes specifically encoding for long-chain fatty-acid usage, the TCA cycle, and electron transport chain have also been identified in L. interrogans. The detection of such genes confirms the use of oxidative phosphorylation as the primary metabolic pathway of L. interrogans. A large amount of genes related to eukaryotic cell invasion, cell attachment, and motility have been discovered. L. interrogans also has a complex set of genes associated with chemotaxis, more so than other pathogenic bacteria such as B. burgdorferi and T. palladium. Such genes able L. interrogans to be such a successful pathogen.

To have the energy necessary for growth and to take over host functions, the bacterium employs methods such as oxidative stress. Stress responses seen in L. interrogans include the up-regulation expression of genes encoding proteins such as chaperone proteins including clpA, heat shock proteins including GroEL, and endoflagellar proteins including flgA.

=== Molecular pathogenesis ===
The loa22 gene has been classified as a virulence factor.

LipL32 is the most abundant protein in L. interrogans. Although LipL32 binds to a number of extracellular matrix components in test tube experiments, there is doubt regarding where this protein is located. One study suggests that it is a subsurface membrane lipoprotein on the inner leaflet of the outer membrane. Some outer membrane proteins, such as OmpL1, aid in the infection process of L. interrogans by allowing adherence to host cells's surface molecules.

As L. interrogans is an obligate aerobe, reactive oxygen species (ROS) must be avoided during metabolism. The perRA and perRB genes encode peroxide responsive regulators, and these regulators promote host adaptation as they contain approximately 17 genes which aid in signaling. L. interrogans also has a rather complex chemotaxis system compared to other pathogenic microbes, contributing to its effectiveness as a pathogen. Virulence is also related to the leptospiral LPS, which is known to uniquely activate macrophages in response to infection.

The bacterial chaperone ClpB is a major driver in the overall virulence of L. interrogans, as it aids in survival inside the host, the control of stress responses, and the unique role of protein disaggregation.

High-Temperature Protein G (HtpG) has been identified as an additional virulence factor in L. interrogans. HtpG is a molecular Chaperone homologous to bacterial Hsp90 and is highly conserved in Leptospira species, including L. interrogans and L. borgpetersenii. Mutations lacking htpG were shown to be completely non-virulent in animal infection models, with infected hamsters showing 100% survival even at high bacterial doses, while other mutants showing full virulence. The htpG mutant exhibited normal growth and resistance to heat, oxidative, and osmmotic stress, implying that htpG is specifically required for infection rather than stress tolerance. HtpG assists shape stability of other virulent proteins, or facilitates pathogen transmissions among hosts. Due to its conservation among Leptospira species, htpG has been identified as a key molecular virulence factor and a potential target for vaccine or therapeutic use.

== Evolution ==
L. interrogans evolved from a saprophytic, nonpathogenic ancestor through gene gain and gene loss. L. interrogans evolutions and mutations affect the microbe's virulence and host selection. The relationships between L. interrogans and the host are dependent on the changes in adhesions, immune evasion, and surface antigens. Sequence variation in virulence-related genes helps Leptospira interrogans adapt to hosts. Notable evolutionary changes of L. interrogans include uncommon LPS, atypical oxidative stress response, reliance on long-chain fatty acid β oxidation instead of glycolysis, and an endoflagella.

=== Virulence and Host adaptation ===
L. interrogans evolved from a non-disease-causing saprophyte that lived in decaying material into a high-virulence pathogen within the P1+ subclade. The genus Leptospira is divided into 2 subclades of nonpathogenic microbes (S1, S2) and two pathogenic subclades (P1, P2), where P1 microbes are considered highly pathogenic. The P1 subclade can be categorized even further into P1+ and P1- subclades, in which the + signifies higher pathogenicity and the - signifies lower pathogenicity. L. interrogans gradually evolved into a P1+ pathogen by first identifying as a saprophyte, then as a P2-like pathogen, next into a P-1-like pathogen, then finally as a P1+ pathogen. P1+ pathogens can stay undetected by the host's complement system and macrophage engulfment for longer compared to P1- and P2 pathogens. P1+ ability to avoid mammalian immune cells may be due in part to the peculiar lipid A structure of its LPS. Comparison of Leptospira interrogans serovar Copenhageni and Leptospira interrogans serovar Lai genomes displays gene variations within the microbes' LPS O side chain biosynthesis genes. Differences in the O antigen of LPS is associated with adaptation of the microbe to different hosts.

P1+ pathogens, like L. interrogans, are susceptible to shape change and damage in external environments. Although the microbe can survive outside of a host, the extracellular microbe survives worse in vitro. When grown in vitro or outside of a living organism in a lab setting, L. interrogans grows more slowly. Redox activity, enzyme activity, and ATP production are all decreased when grown in vitro. This lack in metabolic ability is related to L. interrogans and the P1+ subclades' loss of genes over time due to the imbalance of mobile genetic elements and pseudogenes. 33% of the microbe's non-functional genes are related to its metabolism.

== Environment ==
L. interrogans are host-associated bacteria, and, while they occur globally, most infections occur in tropical regions. In particular, the P1 subclade Leptospira is found in higher rates in Brazil, New Caledonia, and Malaysia, with some rates being as high as 30%. In the host environment, L. interrogans are first found in the blood and subsequently moves on to infect several organs. L. interrogans cells survive and multiply at an optimal rate in the kidneys. Biofilms in the renal tubules consisting of L. interrogans was found in Rattus norvegicus (Norway rats) colonized with the bacteria. The extracellular matrix of L. interrogans biofilms is composed of DNA. Formation of biofilms requires the second messenger c-di-GMP. Biofilms increases L. interrogans ability to persist in the environment. The pathogen mostly spreads through the bodily fluids of infected animals. Rats are the primary carrier of leptospirosis but do not present any symptoms.They transmit the pathogen through urine, which is able to persist in freshwater. Leptospira can remain in surface water and factors such as rainfall, flooding, and water turbidity have been strongly associated with increased Leptospira presence. The pathogen can then enter the body of a new host through the skin and mucous membranes, as well as through the consumption of contaminated waters. Leptospira often enters the body through open cuts and other wounds, though it is unable to pass through an intact skin barrier. Infected wild and domestic animals can continue to excrete the bacteria into the environment for several years, and the bacteria can survive in soil and water for months at a time. Leading theories suggests human exposure comes as a result of leptospires that persist in the soil being washed into surface waters during heavy rain or flooding, in part due to a longer survival period in soil than water.

== Disease ==
=== Humans ===
In humans, symptoms caused by L. interrogans are biphasic, icteric, or anicteric. The icteric form is also known as Weil's disease. Studies have shown that L. interrogans can damage endothelial cell linings in blood vessels and organs, promoting leakage and bacterial spread inside the body. Symptoms can appear anywhere between 2 and 4 weeks after exposure.

The initial anicteric phase typically includes fever, chills, headache, muscle aches, vomiting and diarrhea. Anicteric infections accounts for roughly 90% of human cases. In some infections, the disease progresses to a second icteric phase characterized by petechiae, hepatomegaly, jaundice, renal tubular damage, hemorrhages, and potential kidney failure. Standard treatment includes antibiotics such as doxycycline and penicillin.

Because more than 200 pathogenic Leptospira serovars exist, developing an effective and protective vaccine is challenging. Available vaccines for the serovars such as Hardjo, Pomona, Canicola, Grippotyphosa and Icterohaemorrhagiae have been developed. Unfortunately, these vaccines provide only serovar-specific and short-lived immunity.

=== Dogs ===
Leptospirosis in dogs can present in reproductive, icteric, hemorrhagic, or uremic forms, with the latter often referred to as Stuttgart disease. Infection triggers a highly inflammatory response, including elevated expression of tumor necrosis factor alpha (TNF-α), interleukin-1β, and interleukin-6 in affected tissues. Furthermore, L. interrogans also down-regulates extracellular matrix (ECM) mRNA and proteins, which may correlate with the high susceptibility of canines to leptospirosis.

=== Reservoir host ===
Rats are the primary reservoir hosts of L. interrogans, particularly Rattus norvegicus and Rattus rattus, which can carry the bacterium in their kidneys and transmit through urine without showing symptoms. This shedding contaminates soil and water, allowing indirect transmission to humans and animals.

Although wild rats (especially Rattus norvegicus) are well-documented maintenance hosts for Leptospira interrogans, several case reports describe human infections linked to pet rats and other animals kept as pets such as mice. These cases are usually associated with serogroup Icterohaemorrhagiae. These cases indicate that companion animals such as pet rats can act as sources of human infection.
