= Leptospira fainei =

Scientific classification
- Domain: Bacteria
- Kingdom: Pseudomonadati
- Phylum: Spirochaetota
- Class: Spirochaetia
- Order: Leptospirales
- Family: Leptospiraceae
- Genus: Leptospira
- Species: L. fainei

Binomial name
- Leptospira fainei Perolat et al. 1998

Species of bacterium

Leptospira fainei is a pathogenic species of Leptospira, first isolated from pigs in Australia and named for University of Otago and Monash University microbiologist Dr. Solomon Faine.
