= Leptospira santarosai =

Scientific classification
- Domain: Bacteria
- Kingdom: Pseudomonadati
- Phylum: Spirochaetota
- Class: Spirochaetia
- Order: Leptospirales
- Family: Leptospiraceae
- Genus: Leptospira
- Species: L. santarosai

Binomial name
- Leptospira santarosai Yasuda et al., 1987

Species of bacterium

Leptospira santarosai is a pathogenic species of Leptospira.
