= Leptonema illini =

Scientific classification
- Domain: Bacteria
- Kingdom: Pseudomonadati
- Phylum: Spirochaetota
- Class: Spirochaetia
- Order: Leptospirales
- Family: Leptospiraceae
- Genus: Leptonema; Hovind-Hougen 1983
- Species: L. illini

Binomial name
- Leptonema illini Hovind-Hougen 1983

Species of bacterium

Leptonema illini is a species of bacteria. It belongs to the spirochaetes and it is the only species of the genus Leptonema. It can be found in water and soil media.

== Characteristics ==
Leptonema are Gram-negative bacteria, very thin, helical bacteria of about 0.1-0.2 μm in diameter and 13 to 21 μm. length. They are usually unicellular, but can also be seen as short chains in growing cultures.
