= Leptospira broomii =

Scientific classification
- Domain: Bacteria
- Kingdom: Pseudomonadati
- Phylum: Spirochaetota
- Class: Spirochaetia
- Order: Leptospirales
- Family: Leptospiraceae
- Genus: Leptospira
- Species: L. broomii

Binomial name
- Leptospira broomii Levett et al. 2006

Species of bacterium

Leptospira broomii is a species of Leptospira isolated from humans with leptospirosis. The type strain is 5399^{T} (=ATCC BAA-1107^{T} =KIT 5399^{T}).
