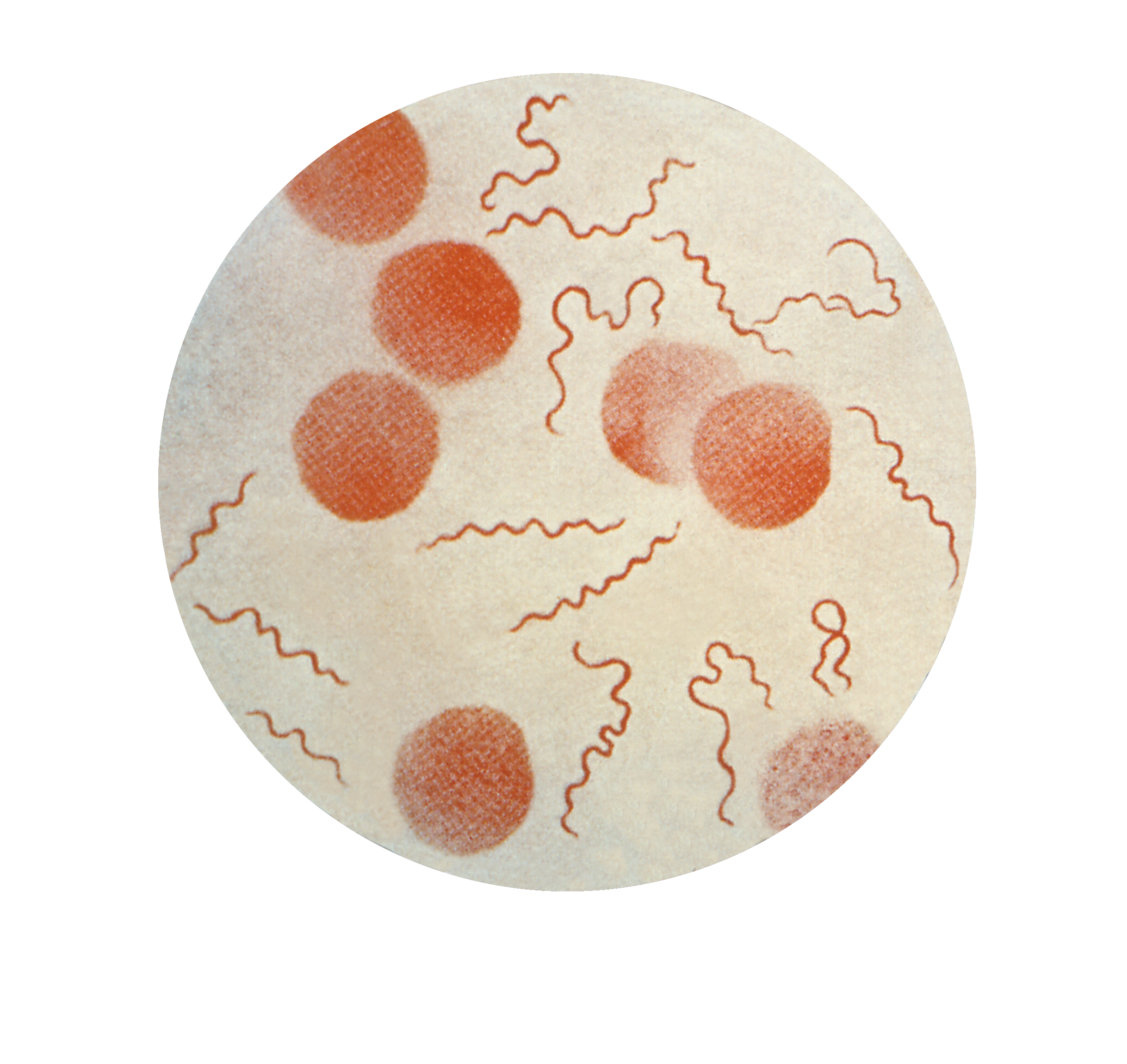
- Photomicrographic view of a culture specimen showing Borrelia recurrentis bacteria

Scientific classification
- Domain: Bacteria
- Kingdom: Pseudomonadati
- Phylum: Spirochaetota
- Class: Spirochaetia
- Order: Spirochaetales
- Family: Borreliaceae
- Genus: Borrelia
- Species: B. recurrentis

Binomial name
- Borrelia recurrentis (Lebert, 1874) Bergey et al., 1925

= Borrelia recurrentis =

Species of bacterium

Borrelia recurrentis is a species of Borrelia, a spirochaete bacterium associated with relapsing fever. B. recurrentis is usually transmitted from person to person by the human body louse. Since the 1800s, the body louse has been known as its only known vector.

B. recurrentis DNA was found in 23% of head lice from patients with louse-borne relapsing fever (LBRF) in Ethiopia. Whether head lice can transmit these bacteria from one person to another remains to be determined.

It is notable for its ability to alter the proteins expressed on its surface, which causes the "relapsing" characteristic of relapsing fever.

== Treatment ==
LBRF is treated with antibiotics. While a single dose has been shown to be effective, using an extended course of penicillin and doxycycline or azithromycin is the most effective treatment for reducing rates of recurrence. This treatment plan also reduces the risk of a Jarisch-Herxheimer reaction, a potentially fatal reaction occurring in more than half of patients who receive treatment for LBRF. Other lice prevention protocols, such as hot showers and frequent bedding changes, are also recommended.

== Origins ==
Genomic analysis of ancient B. recurrentis samples suggests the species diverged from its closest tick-borne relative, Borrelia duttonii, approximately 6,000 to 4,000 years ago during the Late Neolithic to Early Bronze Age.

The transition to louse-borne transmission is linked with increased sedentism, agriculture, and densely populated settlements. The divergence also coincides with the rise of sheep farming for wool in the Near East, Caucasus, and Pontic-Caspian steppe around 6,000 years ago, and its spread to Europe by at least 4,000 years ago. Wool-based textiles created more favorable conditions for human body lice, as the rougher material provides better surfaces for egg laying than plant-based textiles.

Ancient DNA evidence from Britain finds B. recurrentis infections dating back 2,300 years to the Iron Age, with medieval evidence from around 600 years ago. The evolutionary transition from tick-borne relatives involved genome reduction and increased virulence. Much of this genomic change occurred by 2,300 years ago, with additional change continuing until 1,000 years ago.
