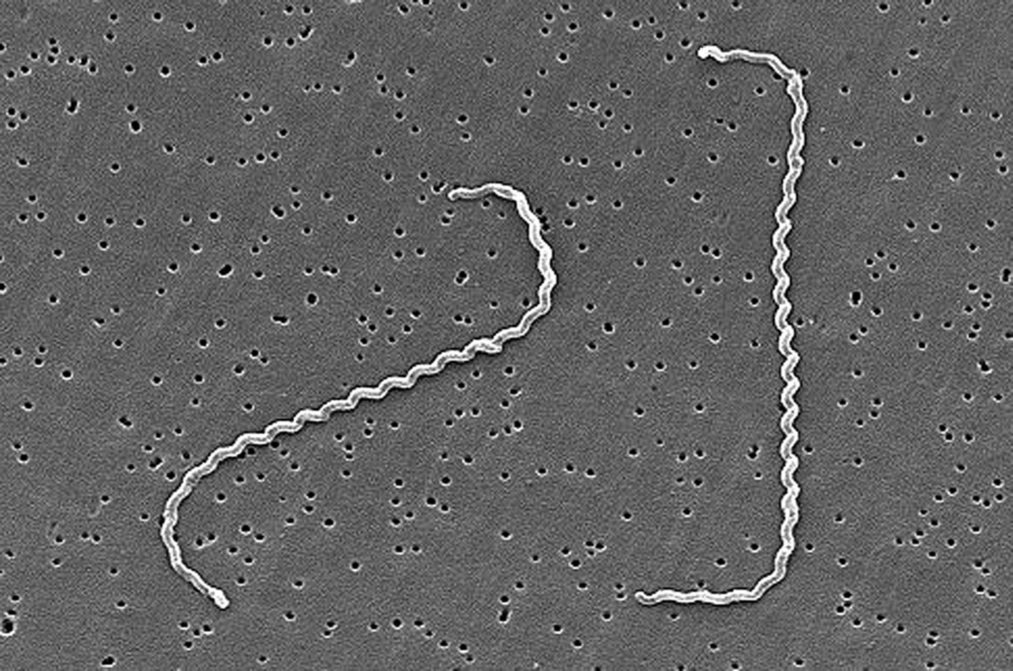
- Scanning electron micrograph of Leptospira interrogans

Scientific classification
- Domain: Bacteria
- Kingdom: Pseudomonadati
- Phylum: Spirochaetota
- Class: Spirochaetia
- Order: Leptospirales
- Family: Leptospiraceae
- Genus: Leptospira; Noguchi 1917 non Swainson 1840 non Boucot, Johnson & Staton 1964

Type species
- Leptospira interrogans (Stimson 1907) Wenyon 1926

Species
- See text

= Leptospira =

Genus of bacteria

Leptospira (from Ancient Greek λεπτός (leptós) 'fine, thin, narrow, etc.' and Latin spira 'coil') is a genus of spirochaete bacteria, including a small number of pathogenic and saprophytic species. Leptospira was first observed in 1907 in kidney tissue slices of a leptospirosis victim who was described as having died of "yellow fever". In 1917, Hideyo Noguchi named the genus Leptospira after witnessing it in the kidneys of American rats seemingly producing the same disease in Guinea pigs as in European rats.

== Taxonomy ==
Leptospira, together with the genera Leptonema and Turneria, is a member of the family Leptospiraceae. The genus Leptospira is divided into 20 species based on DNA hybridization studies.

Pathogenic Leptospira

Leptospira alstonii Smythe et al. 2013 ["Leptospira alstoni" Haake et al. 1993]
Leptospira interrogans (Stimson 1907) Wenyon 1926 emend. Faine and Stallman 1982 ["Spirochaeta interrogans" Stimson 1907; "Spirochaeta nodosa" Hubener & Reiter 1916; "Spirochaeta icterohaemorrhagiae" Inada et al. 1916; "Spirochaeta icterogenes" Uhlenhuth & Fromme 1916; "Leptospira icteroides" Noguchi 1919]
Leptospira kirschneri Ramadass et al. 1992
Leptospira noguchii Yasuda et al. 1987
Leptospira alexanderi Brenner et al. 1999
Leptospira weilii Yasuda et al. 1987
Leptospira borgpetersenii Yasuda et al. 1987
Leptospira santarosai Yasuda et al. 1987
Leptospira kmetyi Slack et al. 2009
Leptospira mayottensis Bourhy et al. 2014

Intermediates or opportunistic Leptospira

Leptospira inadai Yasuda et al. 1987
Leptospira fainei Perolat et al. 1998
Leptospira broomii Levett et al. 2006
Leptospira licerasiae Matthias et al. 2009
Leptospira wolffii Slack et al. 2008

Non-pathogenic Leptospira

Leptospira biflexa (Wolbach and Binger 1914) Noguchi 1918 emend. Faine and Stallman 1982 ["Spirochaeta biflexa" Wolbach & Binger 1914]
Leptospira idonii Saito et al. 2013
Leptospira meyeri Yasuda et al. 1987
Leptospira wolbachii Yasuda et al. 1987
Leptospira vanthielii Smythe et al. 2013
Leptospira terpstrae Smythe et al. 2013
Leptospira yanagawae Smythe et al. 2013

Members of Leptospira are also grouped into serovars according to their antigenic relatedness. There are currently over 200 recognized serovars. A few serovars are found in more than one species of Leptospira.

At its 2002 meeting, the Committee on the Taxonomy of Leptospira of the International Union of Microbiological Societies approved the following nomenclature for serovars of Leptospira. Genus and species names are italicized as usual, with the serovar name not italicized and with an upper case first letter.

Genus species serovar Serovar_name

For example:

- Leptospira interrogans serovar Australis
- Leptospira biflexa serovar Patoc

== Phylogeny ==
The currently accepted taxonomy is based on the List of Prokaryotic names with Standing in Nomenclature (LPSN) and National Center for Biotechnology Information (NCBI).

16S rRNA based LTP_10_2024

- Leptospira
  - - L. idonii
    - - - L. ognonensis
        - - L. ilyithenensis
          - L. kobayashii
      - - L. ryugenii
        - - - - L. biflexa
              - - L. terpstrae
                - - L. meyeri
                  - L. yanagawae
            - - L. vanthielii
              - - L. abararensis
                - L. chreensis
          - - L. levettii
            - - - - L. brenneri
                  - L. perdikensis
                - - L. bourretii
                  - - L. mtsangambouensis
                    - - L. congkakensis
                      - L. noumeaensis
              - - L. jelokensis
                - - L. ellinghausenii
                  - - L. wolbachii
                    - - - L. harrisiae
                        - L. montravelensis
                      - - L. kemamanensis
                        - - L. bandrabouensis
                          - L. bouyouniensis
  - - - - - L. nogchii
          - - L. interrogans
            - L. kirschneri
        - - - L. borgpetersenii
            - L. santarosai
          - - L. alexanderi
            - - L. mayottensis
              - L. weilii
      - - - L. sanjuanensis
          - L. yasudae
        - - L. dzianensis Vincent et al. 2020
          - - L. ellisii
            - - - L. barantonii
                - L. kmetyi
              - - L. alstonii
                - - L. gomenensis
                  - - L. adleri
                    - - L. ainazelensis
                      - - L. putramalaysiae Vincent et al. 2020
                        - - L. ainlahdjerensis
                          - - L. stimsonii
                            - L. tipperaryensis
    - - L. perolatii
      - - L. wolffii
        - - - L. fletcheri
            - - L. inadai
              - - L. broomii
                - L. fainei
          - - - L. licerasiae
              - - - L. johnsonii
                  - - L. koniambonensis
                    - - L. neocaledonica
                      - L. saintgironsiae
            - - - L. semungkisensis
                - - L. langatensis
                  - L. sarikeiensis
              - - L. dzoumogneensis
                - - L. andrefontaineae
                  - - L. selangorensis
                    - - L. haakeii
                      - - L. hartskeerlii
                        - L. venezuelensis

120 marker proteins based GTDB 10-RS226

- Leptospira
  - - - - L. ognonensis Vincent et al. 2020
        - L. ryugenii Masuzawa et al. 2019
      - - L. idonii Saito et al. 2013
        - - L. ilyithenensis Vincent et al. 2020
          - L. kobayashii Vincent et al. 2020
    - - - - L. biflexa (Wolbach and Binger 1914) Noguchi 1918
          - - L. bouyouniensis Vincent et al. 2020
            - - L. jelokensis Vincent et al. 2020
              - L. yanagawae Smythe et al. 2013
        - - L. kemamanensis Vincent et al. 2020
          - - "L. limi" dos Santos Ribeiro et al. 2023
            - - L. ellinghausenii Masuzawaet al. 2019
              - - L. levettii Thibeaux et al. 2020
                - "L. paudalimensis" dos Santos Ribeiro et al. 2023
      - - L. brenneri Thibeaux et al. 2020
        - - - L. terpstrae Smythe et al. 2013
            - - - L. abararensis Korba et al. 2021
                - L. vanthielii Smythe et al. 2013
              - - L. chreensis Korba et al. 2021
                - L. wolbachii Yasuda et al. 1987
          - - - "L. soteropolitanensis" dos Santos Ribeiro et al. 2023
              - - L. bandrabouensis Vincent et al. 2020
                - L. montravelensis Vincent et al. 2020
            - - - L. harrisiae Thibeaux et al. 2020
                - - L. meyeri Yasuda et al. 1987
                  - - L. bourretii Vincent et al. 2020
                    - L. mtsangambouensis Vincent et al. 2020
              - - L. perdikensis Vincent et al. 2020
                - - L. congkakensis Vincent et al. 2020
                  - - L. noumeaensis Vincent et al. 2020
                    - L. kanakyensis Vincent et al. 2020
  - - - - L. ellisii Thibeaux et al. 2020
        - L. gomenensis Vincent et al. 2020
      - - - - L. sanjuanensis Fernandes et al. 2022
            - L. yasudae Casanovas-Massana et al. 2020
          - - L. barantonii Thibeaux et al. 2020
            - L. kmetyi Slack et al. 2009
        - - - L. adleri Thibeaux et al. 2020
            - - L. stimsonii Casanovas-Massana et al. 2021
              - - L. ainazelensis Korba et al. 2021
                - - L. ainlahdjerensis Korba et al. 2021
                  - L. tipperaryensis Vincent et al. 2020
          - - L. alstonii Smythe et al. 2013
            - - - L. nogchii Yasuda et al. 1987
                - - L. interrogans (Stimson 1907) Wenyon 1926 (type sp.)
                  - L. kirschneri Ramadass et al. 1992
              - - L. santarosai Yasuda et al. 1987
                - - - L. borgpetersenii Yasuda et al. 1987
                    - L. mayottensis Bourhy et al. 2014
                  - - L. alexanderi Brenner et al. 1999
                    - L. weilii Yasuda et al. 1987
    - - L. perolatii Thibeaux et al. 2020
      - - - - L. fletcheri Vincent et al. 2020
            - "L. fluminis" Vincent et al. 2019
          - - L. fainei Perolat et al. 1998
            - - L. broomii Levett et al. 2006
              - L. inadai Yasuda et al. 1987
        - - L. wolffii Slack et al. 2008 non Slack et al. 2008
          - - - L. langatensis Vincent et al. 2020
              - L. semungkisensis Vincent et al. 2020
            - - L. sarikeiensis Vincent et al. 2020
              - - - L. johnsonii Masuzawa et al. 2019
                  - L. neocaledonica Thibeaux et al. 2020
                - - L. licerasiae Matthias et al. 2009
                  - - L. hartskeerlii Thibeaux et al. 2020
                    - - - L. dzoumogneensis Vincent et al. 2020
                        - L. venezuelensis Puche et al. 2018
                      - - - L. koniambonensis corrig. Vincent et al. 2020
                          - L. saintgironsiae Thibeaux et al. 2020
                        - - L. selangorensis Vincent et al. 2020
                          - - L. andrefontaineae Vincent et al. 2020
                            - L. haakeii Thibeaux et al. 2020

Species incertae sedis:

- "L. andamana" Tripathy, Evans & Hanson 1971 non Collier 1948
- "L. brihuegai" Grune Loffler et al. 2015
- L. cinconiae Hamond et al. 2025
- L. gorisiae Hamond et al. 2025
- "L. hardjobovis" Srinivas, Walker & Rippke 2013
- L. iowaensis Hamond et al. 2025
- "L. macculloughii" Thibeaux et al. 2018
- L. mgodei Hamond et al. 2025
- L. milleri Hamond et al. 2025

== Morphology ==
Although over 200 serotypes of Leptospira have been described, all members of the genus have similar morphology. Leptospira are spiral-shaped bacteria that are 6-20 μm long and 0.1 μm in diameter with a wavelength of about 0.5 μm. One or both ends of the spirochete are usually hooked. Because they are so thin, live Leptospira are best observed by darkfield microscopy.

The bacteria have a number of degrees of freedom; when ready to proliferate via binary fission, the bacterium noticeably bends in the place of the future split.

== Cellular structure ==
Leptospira have a Gram-negative-like cell envelope consisting of a cytoplasmic and outer membrane. However, the peptidoglycan layer is associated with the cytoplasmic rather than the outer membrane, an arrangement that is unique to spirochetes. The two flagella of Leptospira extend from the cytoplasmic membrane at the ends of the bacterium into the periplasmic space and are necessary for the motility of Leptospira.

The outer membrane contains a variety of lipoproteins and transmembrane outer membrane proteins. As expected, the protein composition of the outer membrane differs when comparing Leptospira growing in artificial medium with Leptospira present in an infected animal. Several leptospiral outer membrane proteins have been shown to attach to the host extracellular matrix and to factor H. These proteins may be important for adhesion of Leptospira to host tissues and in resisting complement, respectively.

The outer membrane of Leptospira, like those of most other Gram-negative bacteria, contains lipopolysaccharide (LPS). Differences in the highly immunogenic LPS structure account for the numerous serovars of Leptospira. Consequently, immunity is serovar specific; current leptospiral vaccines, which consist of one or several serovars of Leptospira endemic in the population to be immunized, protect only against the serovars contained in the vaccine preparation. Leptospiral LPS has low endotoxin activity. An unusual feature of leptospiral LPS is that it activates host cells via TLR2 rather than TLR4. The unique structure of the lipid A portion of the LPS molecule may account for this observation. Finally, the LPS O antigen content of L. interrogans differs in an acutely infected versus a chronically infected animal. The role of O antigen changes in the establishment or maintenance of acute or chronic infection, if any, is unknown.

== Habitat ==
Leptospira, both pathogenic and saprophytic, can occupy diverse environments, habitats, and life cycles; these bacteria are found throughout the world, except in Antarctica. High humidity and neutral (6.9–7.4) pH are necessary for their survival in the environment, with stagnant water reservoirs—bogs, shallow lakes, ponds, puddles, etc.—being the natural habitat for the bacteria.

== Nutrition ==
Leptospira are cultivated at 30 °C in Ellinghausen-McCullough-Johnson-Harris (EMJH) medium, which can be supplemented with 0.21% rabbit serum to enhance growth of fastidious strains. Growth of pathogenic Leptospira in an artificial nutrient environment such as EMJH becomes noticeable in 4–7 days; growth of saprophytic strains occur within 2–3 days. The minimal growth temperature of pathogenic species is 13–15 °C. Because the minimal growth temperature of the saprophytes is 5–10 °C, the ability of Leptospira to grow at 13 °C can be used to distinguish saprophytic from pathogenic Leptospira species. The optimal pH for growth of Leptospira is 7.2–7.6.

Leptospira are aerobes whose major carbon and energy source during in vitro growth is long-chain fatty acids, which are metabolized by beta-oxidation. Fatty acids are provided in EMJH in the form of Tween. Fatty acid molecules are bound by albumin in EMJH and are released slowly into the medium to prevent its toxic accumulation.

Like most bacteria, Leptospira require iron for growth. L. interrogans and L. biflexa have the ability to acquire iron in different forms. A TonB-dependent receptor required for utilization of the ferrous form of the iron has been identified in L. biflexa, and an ortholog of the receptor is encoded in the genome of L. interrogans. L. interrogans can also obtain iron from heme, which is bound to most of the iron in the human body. The HbpA hemin-binding protein, which may be involved in the uptake of hemin, has been identified on the surface of L. interrogans Although other pathogenic species of Leptospira and L. biflexa lack HbpA, yet another hemin-binding protein, LipL41, may account for their ability to use hemin as a source of iron. Although they do not secrete siderophores, L. biflexa and L. interrogans may be capable of obtaining iron from siderophores secreted by other microorganisms.

== Genome ==
The genome of pathogenic Leptospira consists of two chromosomes. The size of the genomes of L. interrogans serovars Copenhageni and Lai is approximately 4.6 Mb. However, the genome of L. borgpetersenii serovar Hardjo is only 3.9 Mb in size with a large number of pseudogenes, gene fragments, and insertion sequences relative to the genomes of L. interrogans. L. interrogans and L. borgpetersenii share 2708 genes from which 656 are pathogenic specific genes. The guanine plus cytosine (GC) content is between 35% and 41%. L. borgpetersenii serovar Hardjo is usually transmitted by direct exposure to infected tissues, whereas L. interrogans is often acquired from water or soil contaminated by the urine of carrier animals harboring Leptospira in their kidneys. The high number of defective genes and insertion sequences in L. borgpetersenii Hardjo together with the poor survival outside of the host and difference in transmission patterns compared to L. interrogans suggest that L. borgpetersenii is undergoing insertion-sequence mediated genomic decay, with ongoing loss of genes necessary for survival outside of the host animal.

== Genotyping ==
Genome sequence determination several strains of Leptospira lead to the development of multilocus VNTR (Variable Number of Tandem Repeats) typing and multilocus sequence typing (MLST) for species level identification of pathogenic Leptospira species. Both methods hold the potential to replace the highly ambiguous serotyping method currently in vogue for leptospiral strain identification.

== See also ==
- Leptospirosis
- List of bacteria genera
- List of bacterial orders
