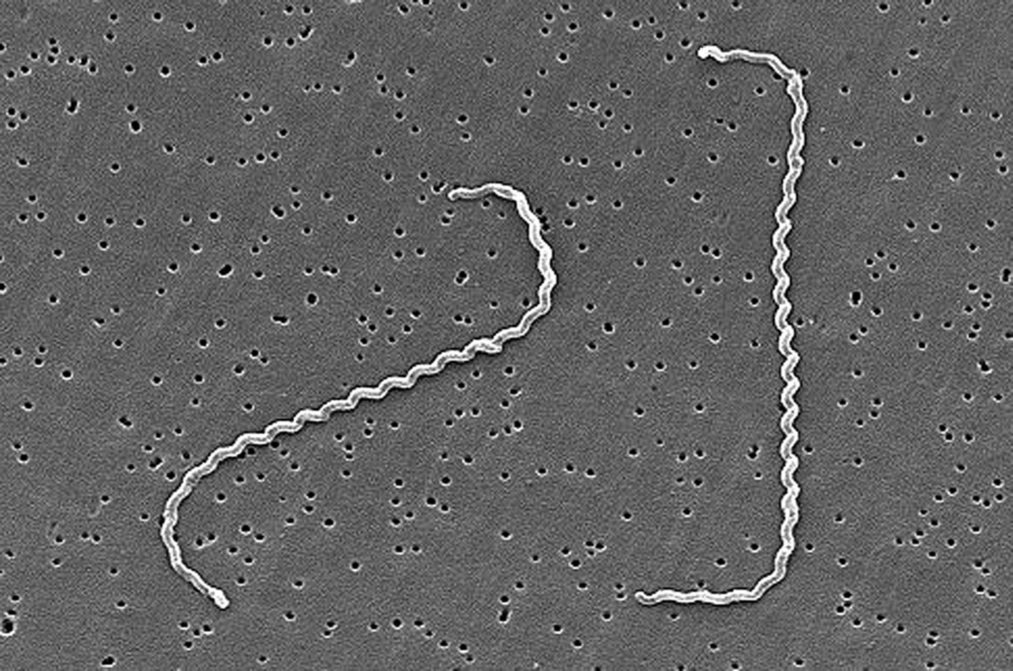
- Leptospira interrogan

Scientific classification
- Domain: Bacteria
- Kingdom: Pseudomonadati
- Phylum: Spirochaetota
- Class: Spirochaetia
- Order: Leptospirales; Gupta et al. 2014
- Family: Leptospiraceae; Pillot 1965 ex Hovind-Hougen 1979

Genera
- Leptonema; Leptospira; Turneriella

Synonyms
- Leptonemataceae Chuvochina et al. 2024; Turneriellaceae Chuvochina et al. 2024

= Leptospiraceae =

Family of bacteria

The Leptospiraceae are a family of spirochete bacteria. It includes the genus Leptospira which contains some pathogenic species.

== Phylogeny ==
The currently accepted taxonomy is based on the List of Prokaryotic names with Standing in Nomenclature (LPSN) and National Center for Biotechnology Information (NCBI).

16S rRNA based LTP_10_2024

- Leptospirales
  - Leptospiraceae
    - Turneriella Levett et al. 2005
    - - Leptonema Hovind-Hougen 1983
      - Leptospira Noguchi 1917

120 marker proteins based GTDB 10-RS226

- "Leptospirae"
  - Leptospiria
    - Turneriellales
      - Turneriellaceae
        Turneriella
    - Leptospirales
      - Leptonemataceae
        Leptonema
      - Leptospiraceae
        Leptospira

== See also ==
- List of bacterial orders
- List of bacteria genera
